= List of plant genera named after people (D–J) =

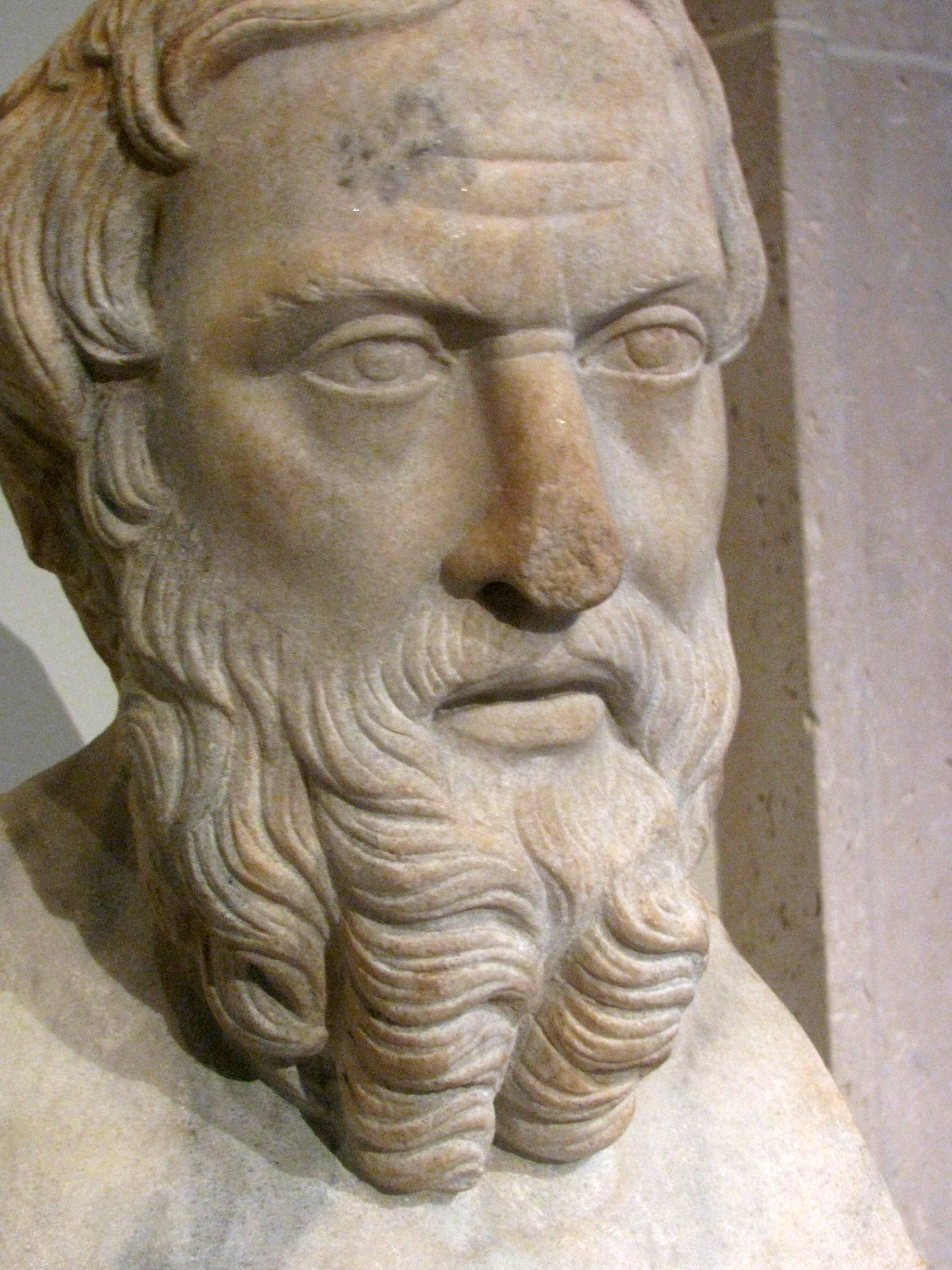
Bust of Herodotus (Metropolitan Museum of Art). See Herodotia.

Since the first printing of Carl Linnaeus's Species Plantarum in 1753, plants have been assigned one epithet or name for their species and one name for their genus, a grouping of related species. Thousands of plants have been named after people, including botanists and their colleagues, plant collectors, horticulturists, explorers, rulers, politicians, clerics, doctors, philosophers and scientists. Even before Linnaeus, botanists such as Joseph Pitton de Tournefort, Charles Plumier and Pier Antonio Micheli were naming plants after people, sometimes in gratitude for the financial support of their patrons.

Early works researching the naming of plant genera include an 1810 glossary by Alexandre de Théis and an etymological dictionary in two editions (1853 and 1856) by Georg Christian Wittstein. Modern works include The Gardener's Botanical by Ross Bayton, Index of Eponymic Plant Names and Encyclopedia of Eponymic Plant Names by Lotte Burkhardt, Plants of the World by Maarten J. M. Christenhusz (lead author), Michael F. Fay and Mark W. Chase, The A to Z of Plant Names by Allan J. Coombes, the four-volume CRC World Dictionary of Plant Names by Umberto Quattrocchi, and Stearn's Dictionary of Plant Names for Gardeners by William T. Stearn; these supply the seed-bearing genera listed in the first column below. Excluded from this list are genus names not accepted (as of January 2021) at Plants of the World Online, which includes updates to Plants of the World (2017).

== Key ==
Ba = listed in Bayton's The Gardener's Botanical
Bt = listed in Burkhardt's Encyclopedia of Eponymic Plant Names
Bu = listed in Burkhardt's Index of Eponymic Plant Names
Ch = listed in Christenhusz's Plants of the World
Co = listed in Coombes's The A to Z of Plant Names
Qu = listed in Quattrocchi's CRC World Dictionary of Plant Names
St = listed in Stearn's Dictionary of Plant Names for Gardeners

In addition, Burkhardt's Index is used as a reference for every row in the table, except as noted.

== Genera ==
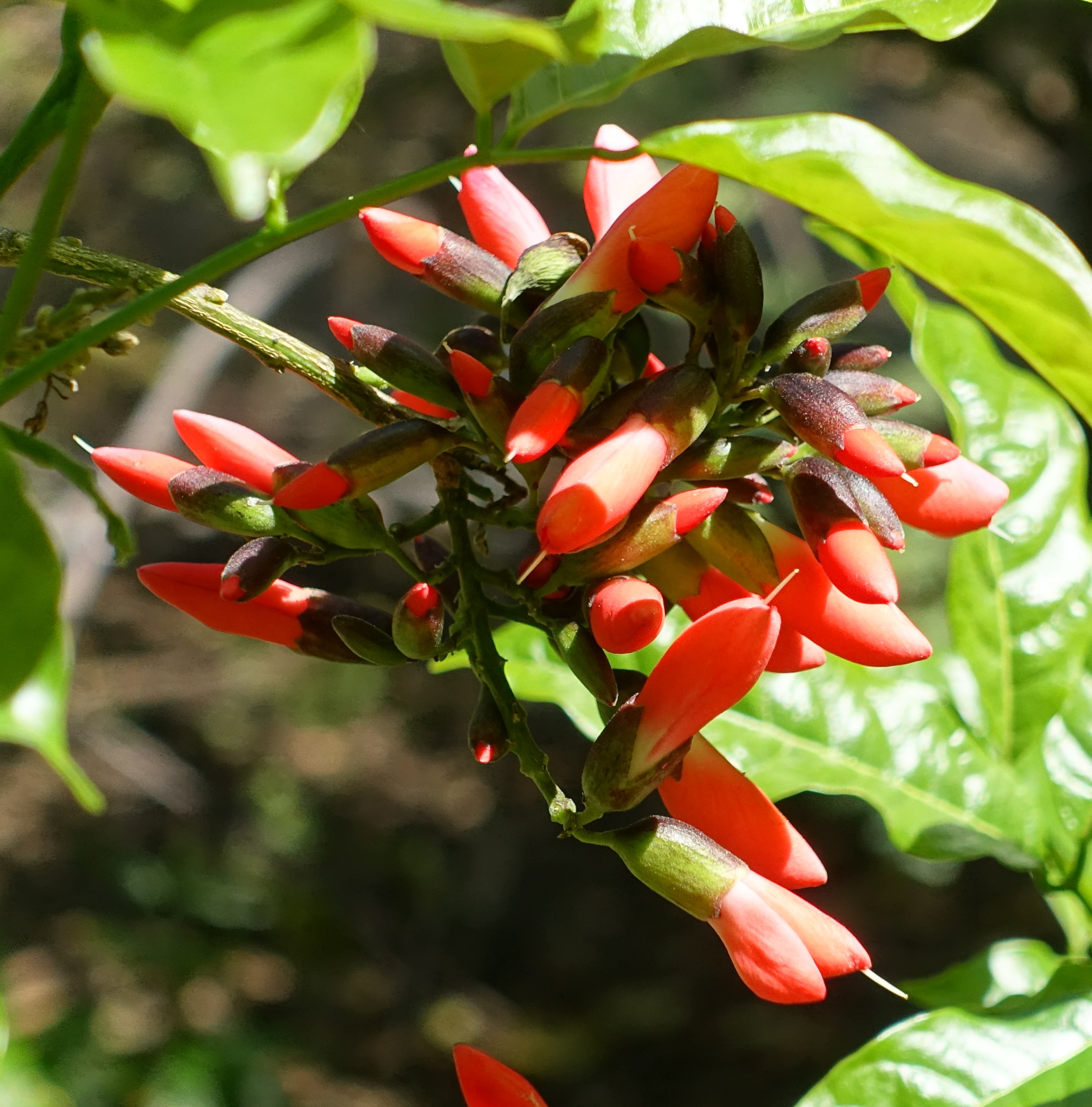
Dahlstedtia

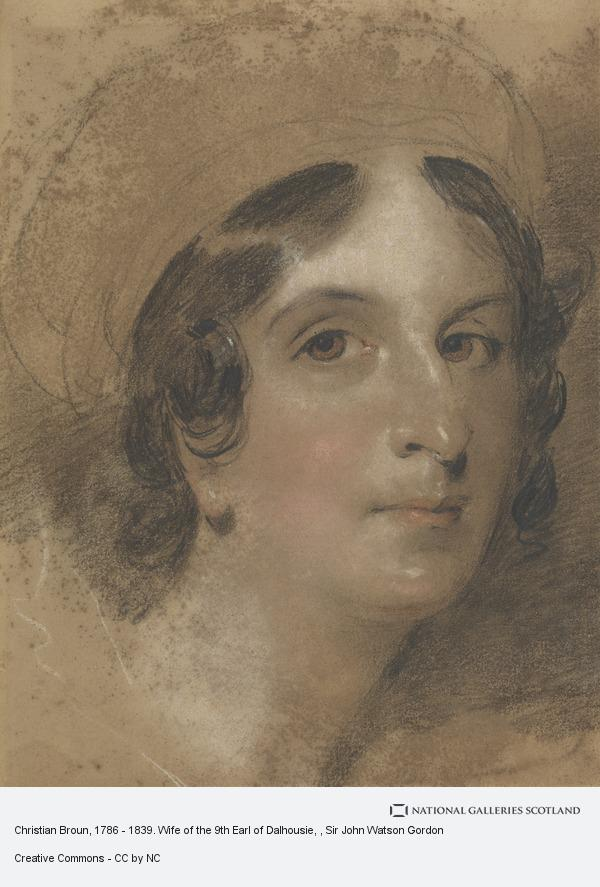
Christian Ramsay, Countess of Dalhousie

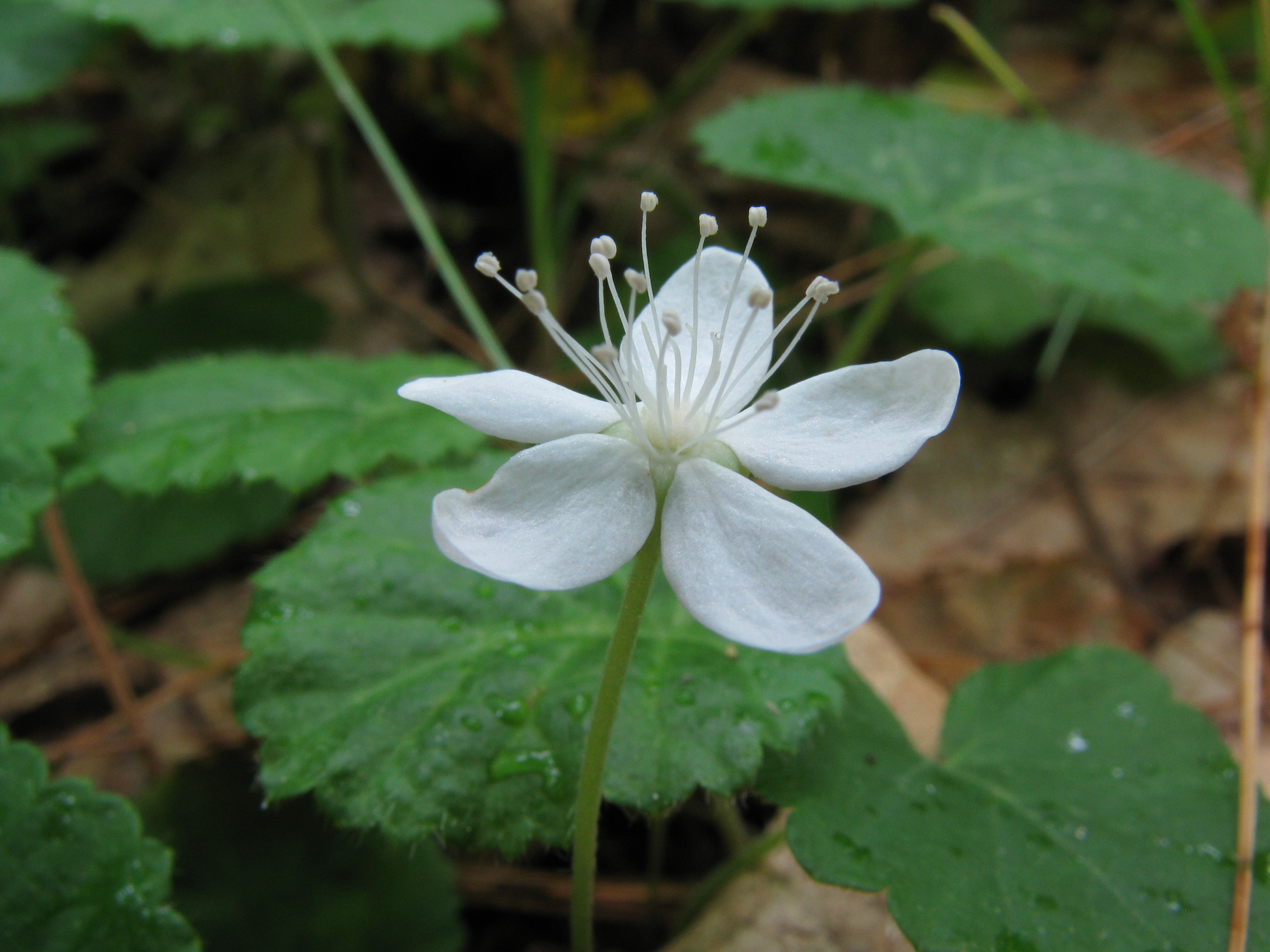
Dalibarda

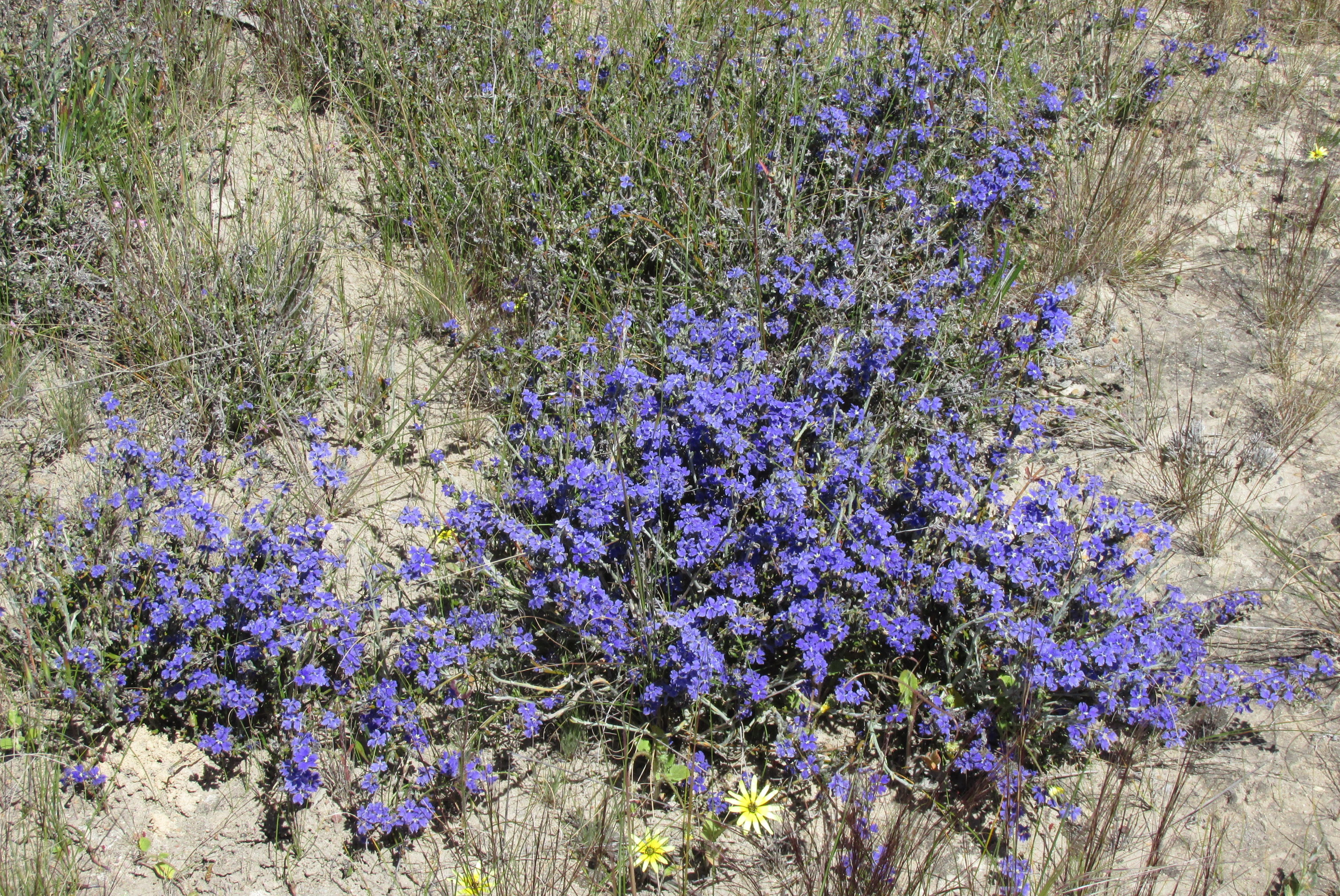
Dampiera

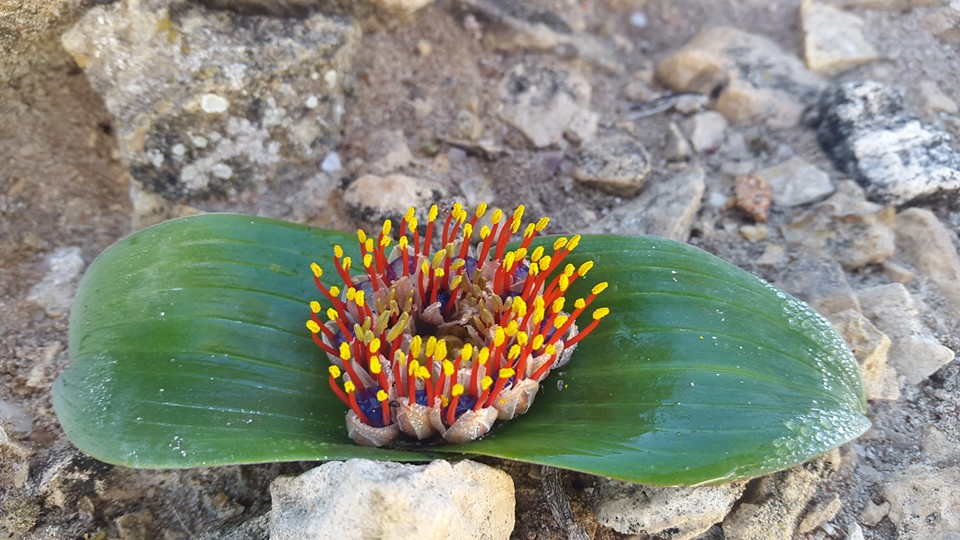
Daubenya

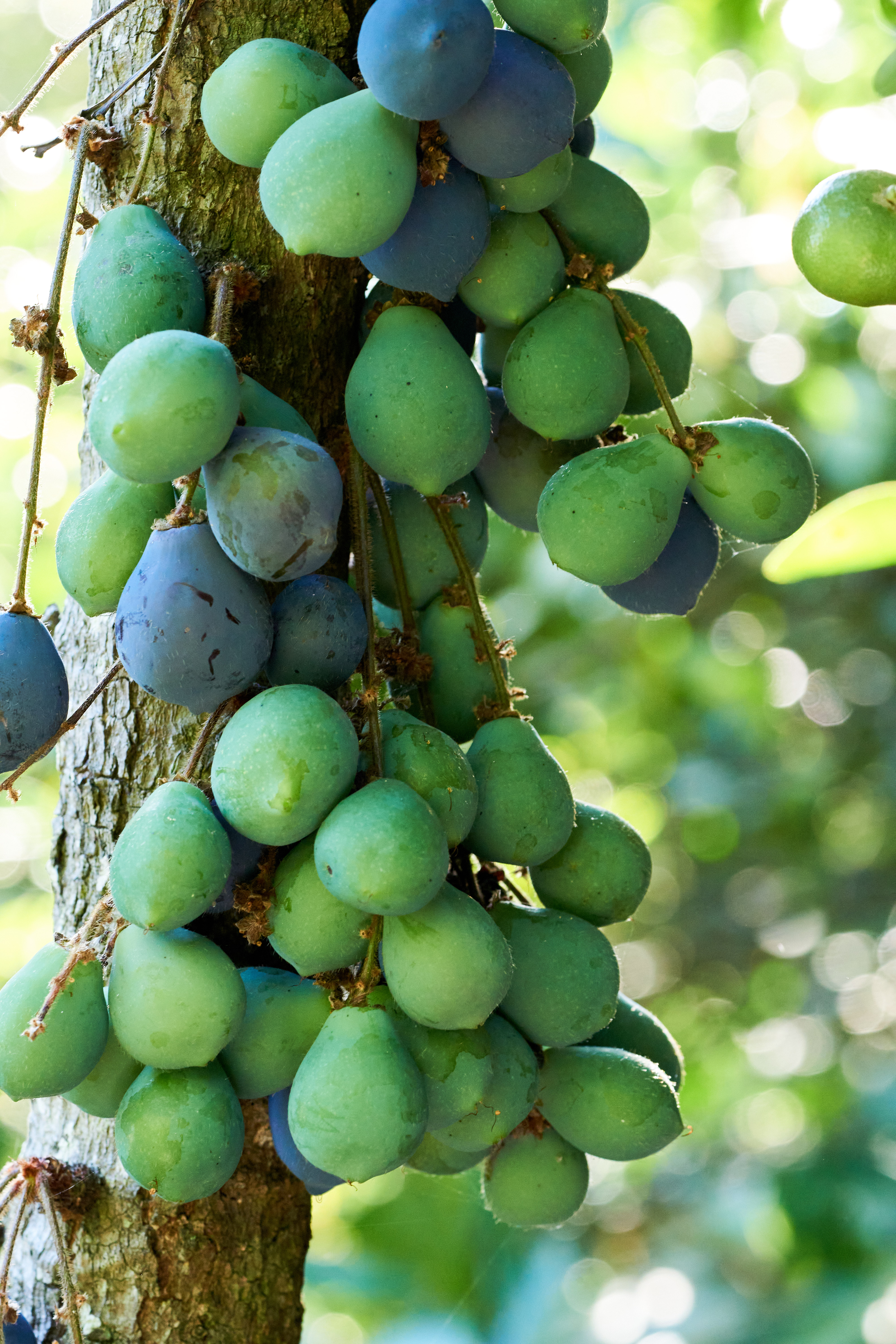
Davidsonia fruits

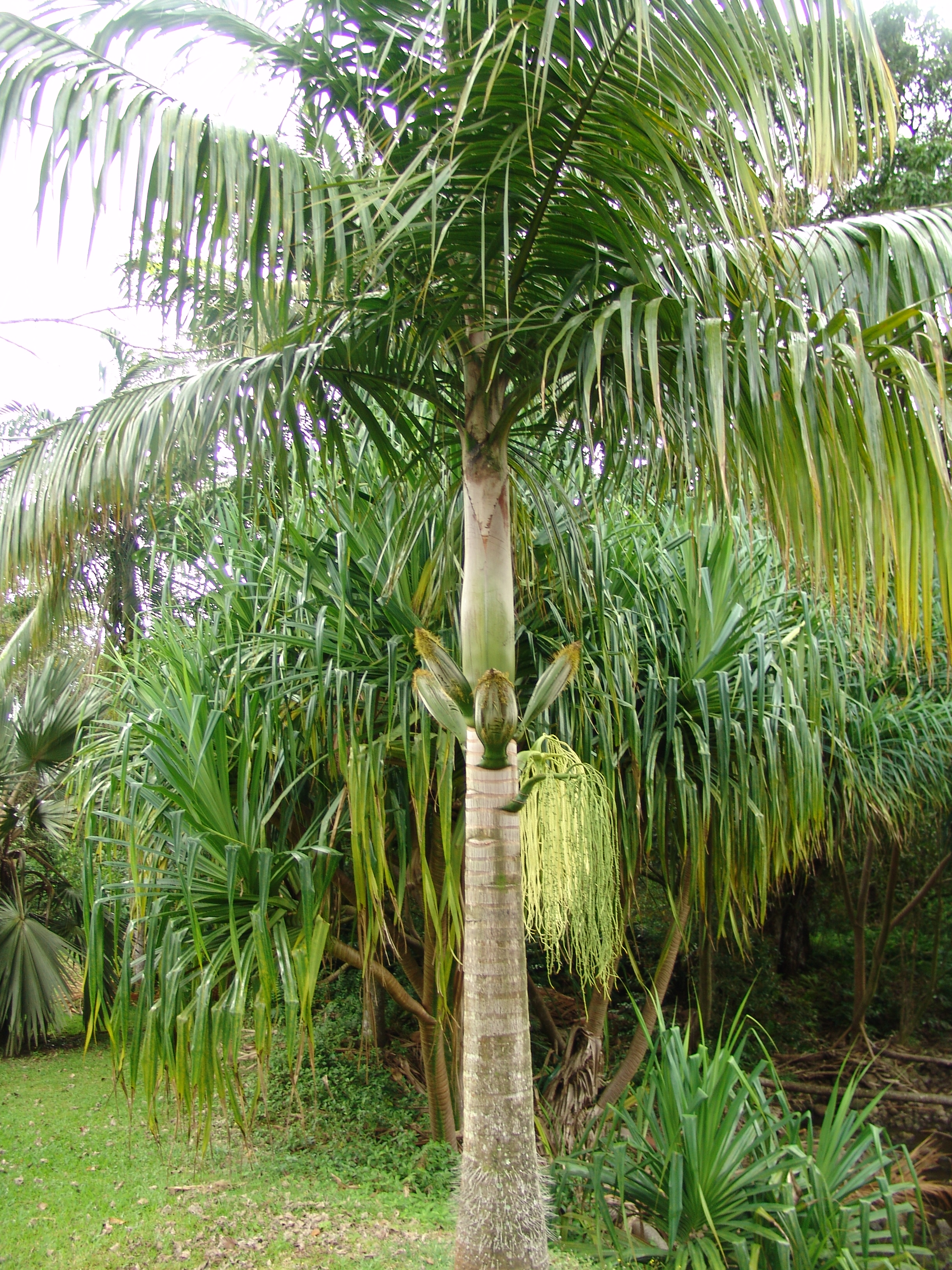
Deckenia

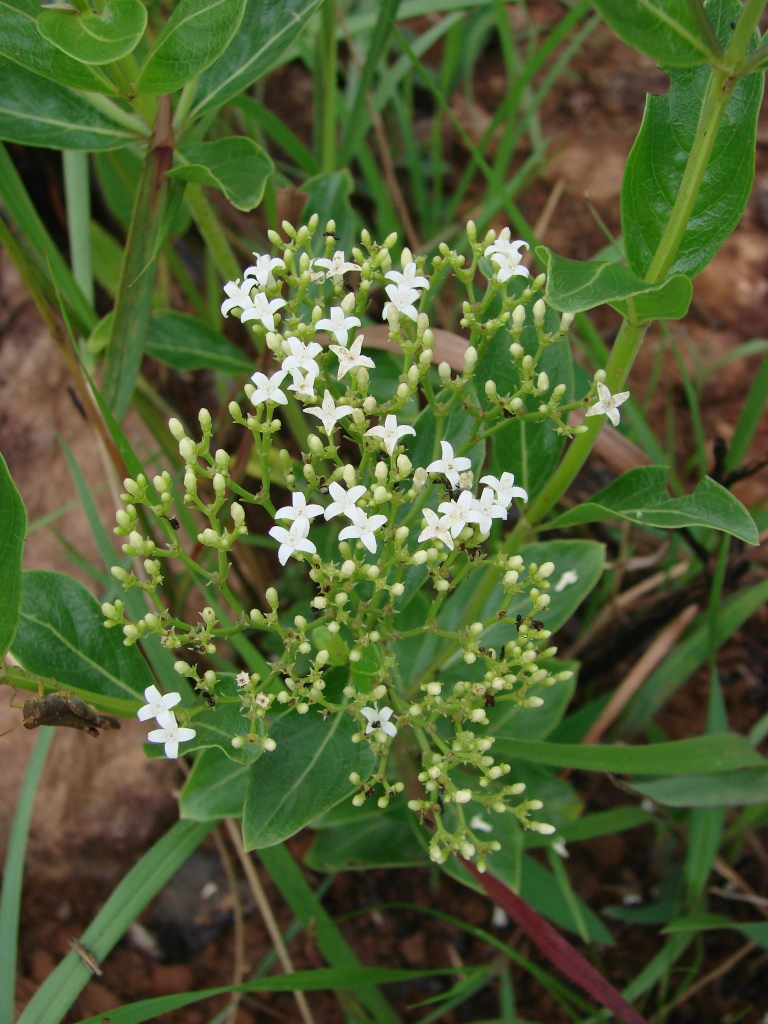
Declieuxia

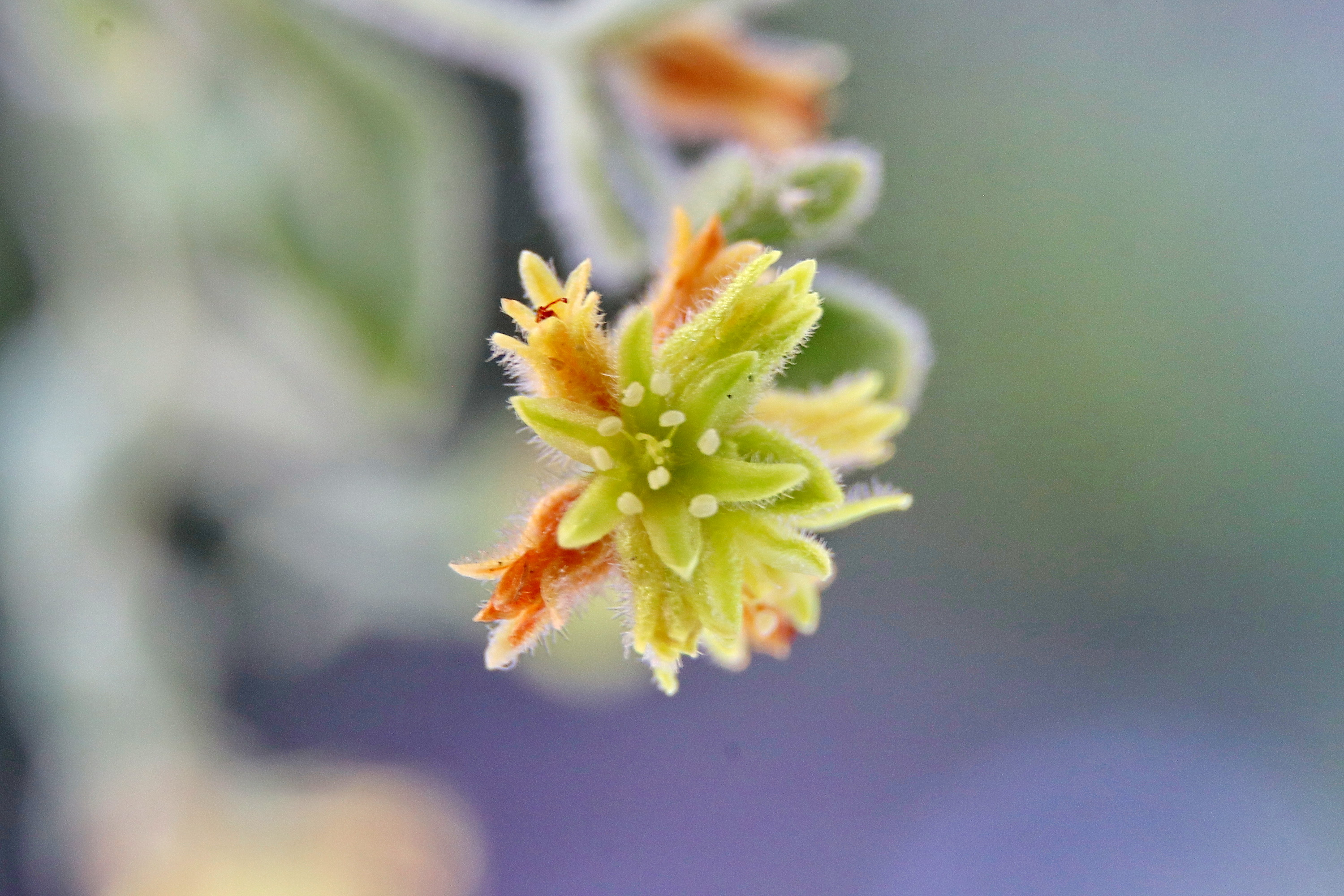
Dedeckera

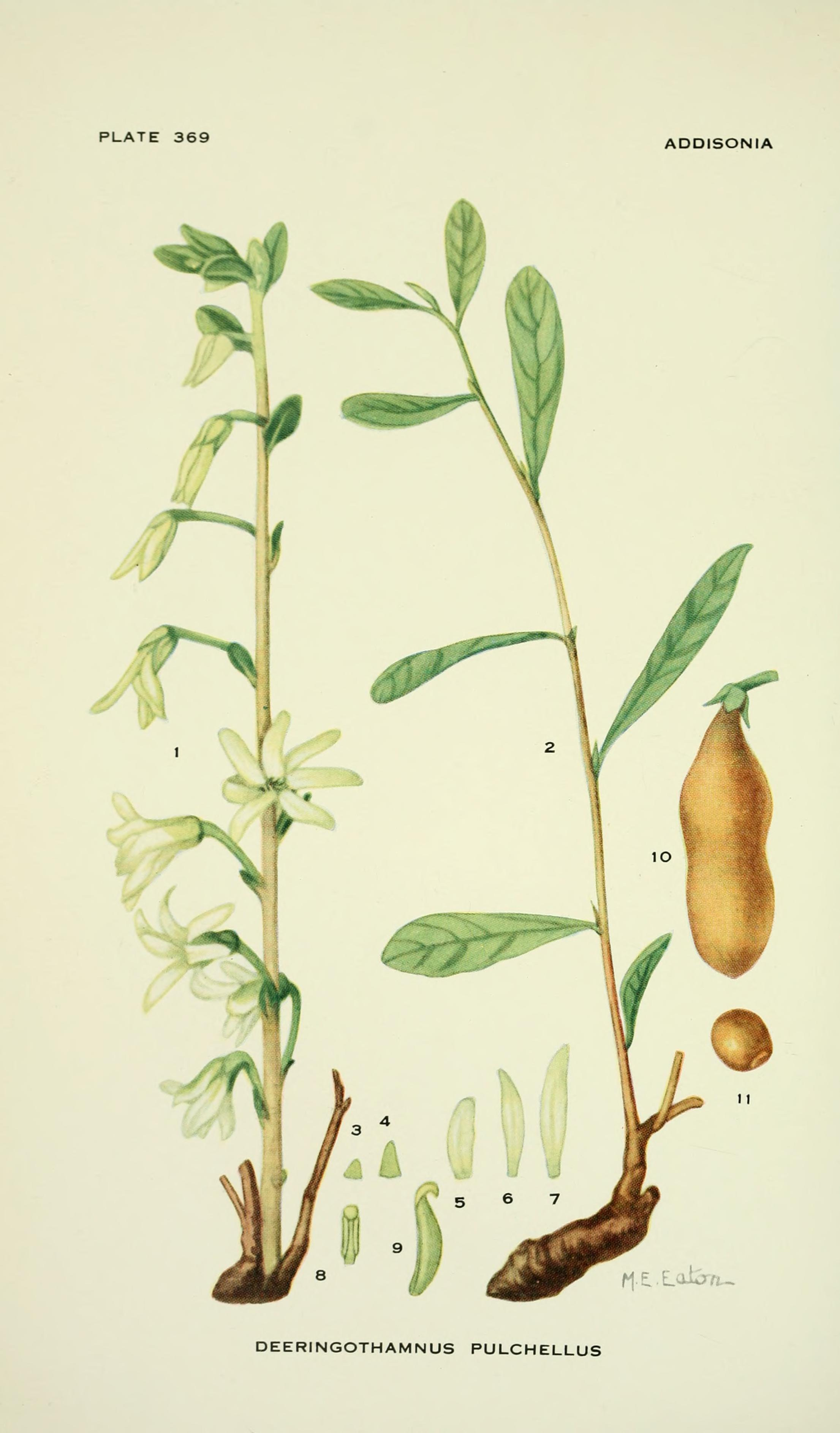
Deeringothamnus

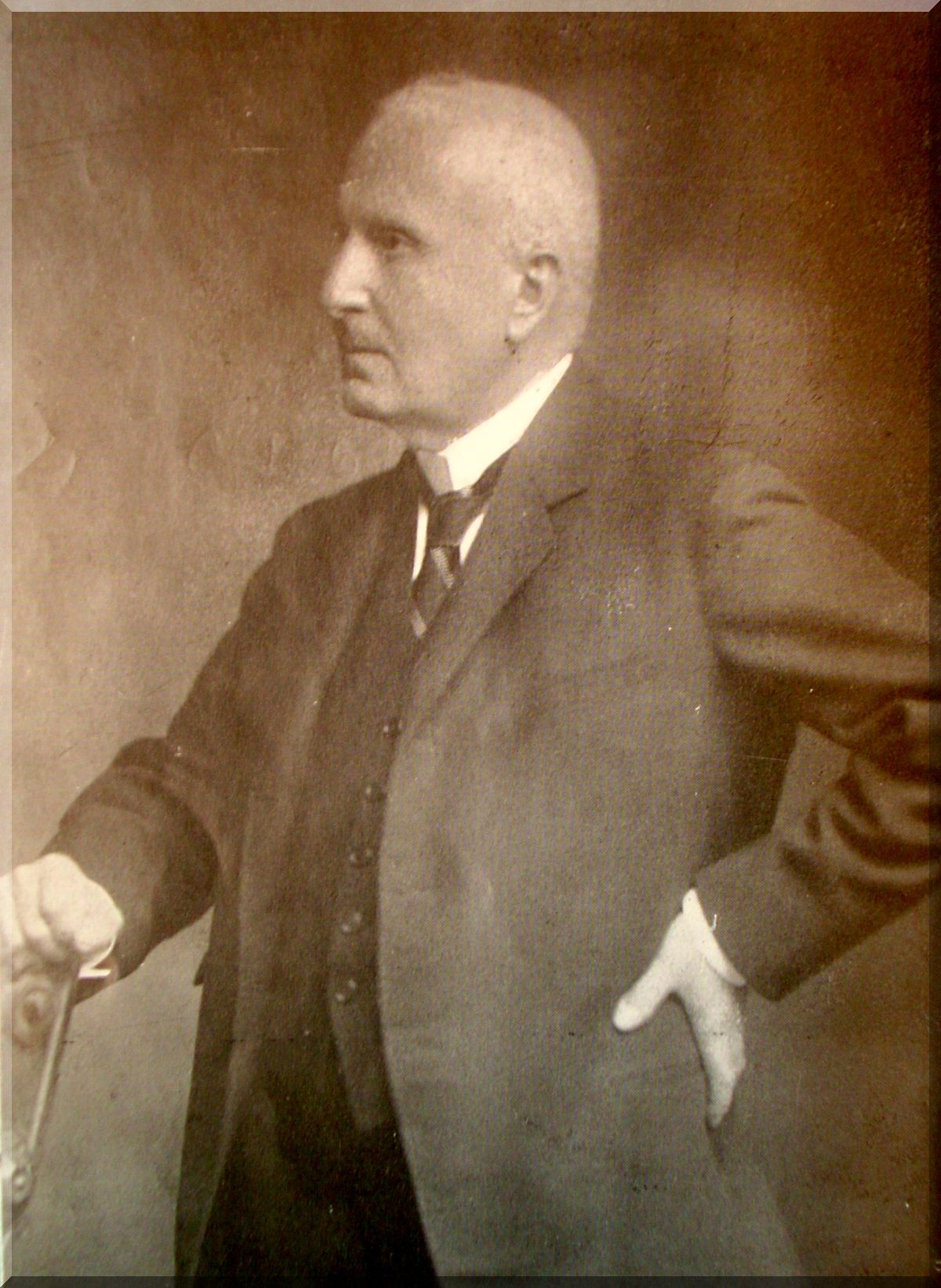
Árpád von Degen

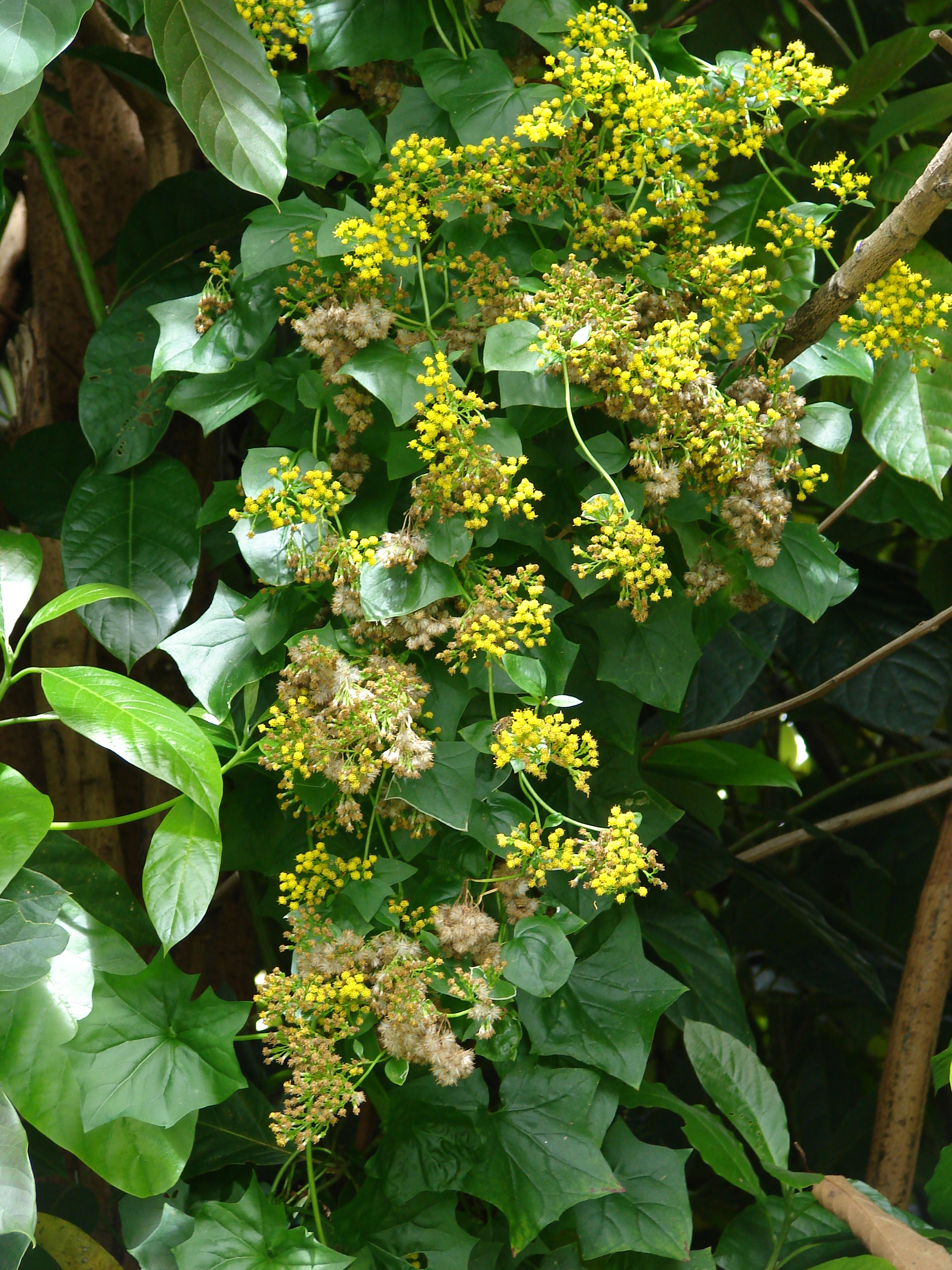
Delairea

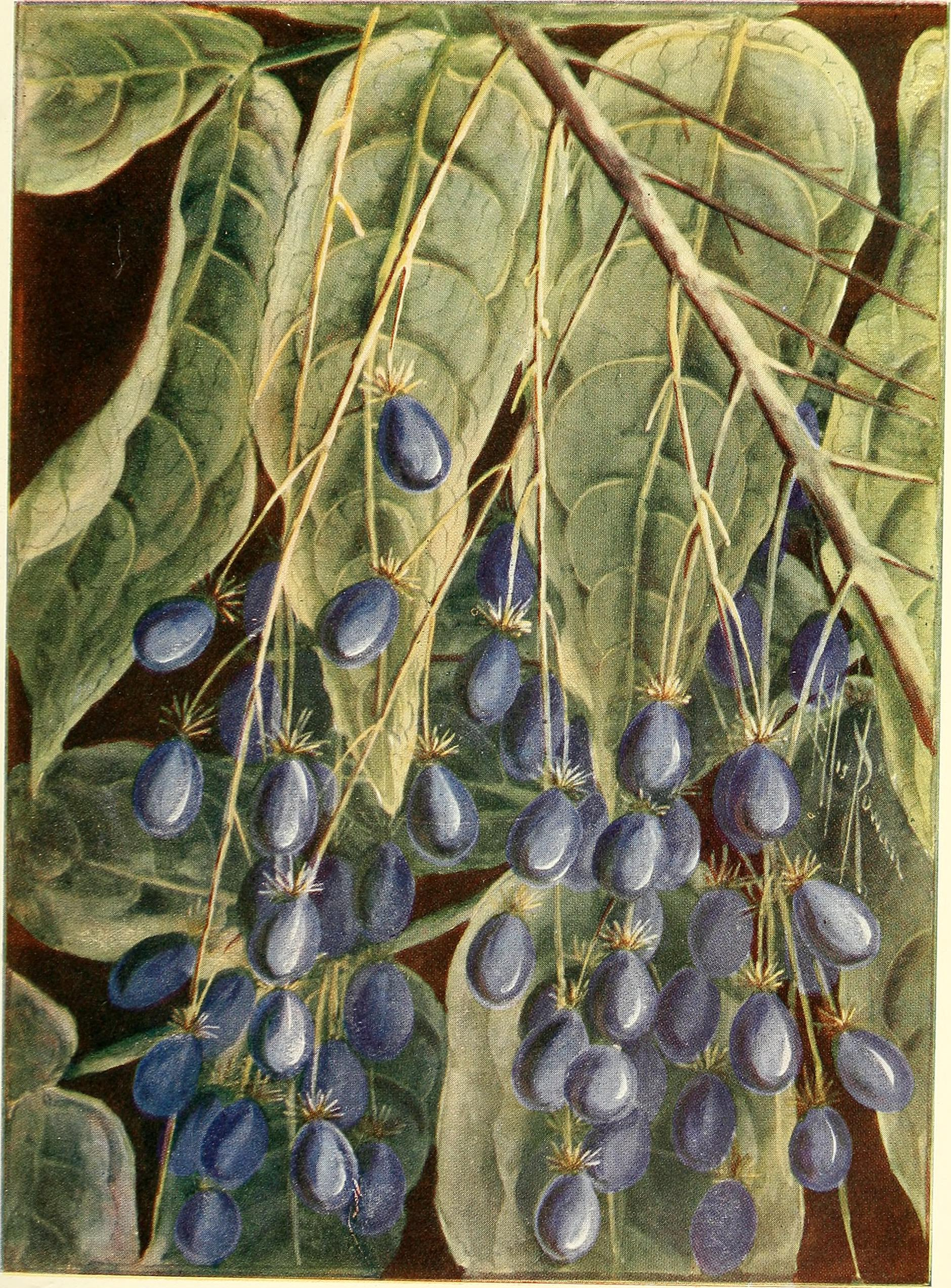
Delarbrea illustration

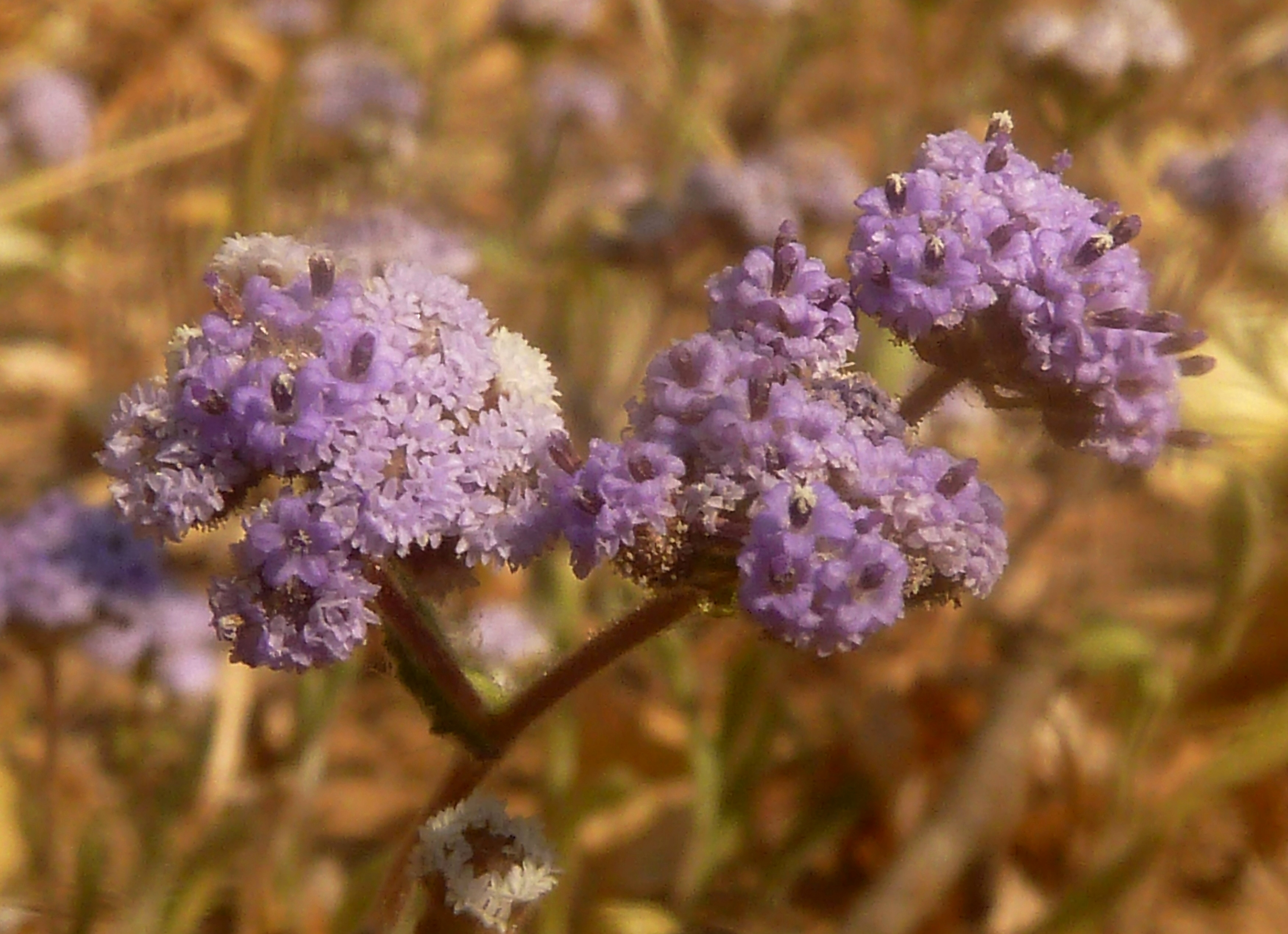
Denekia

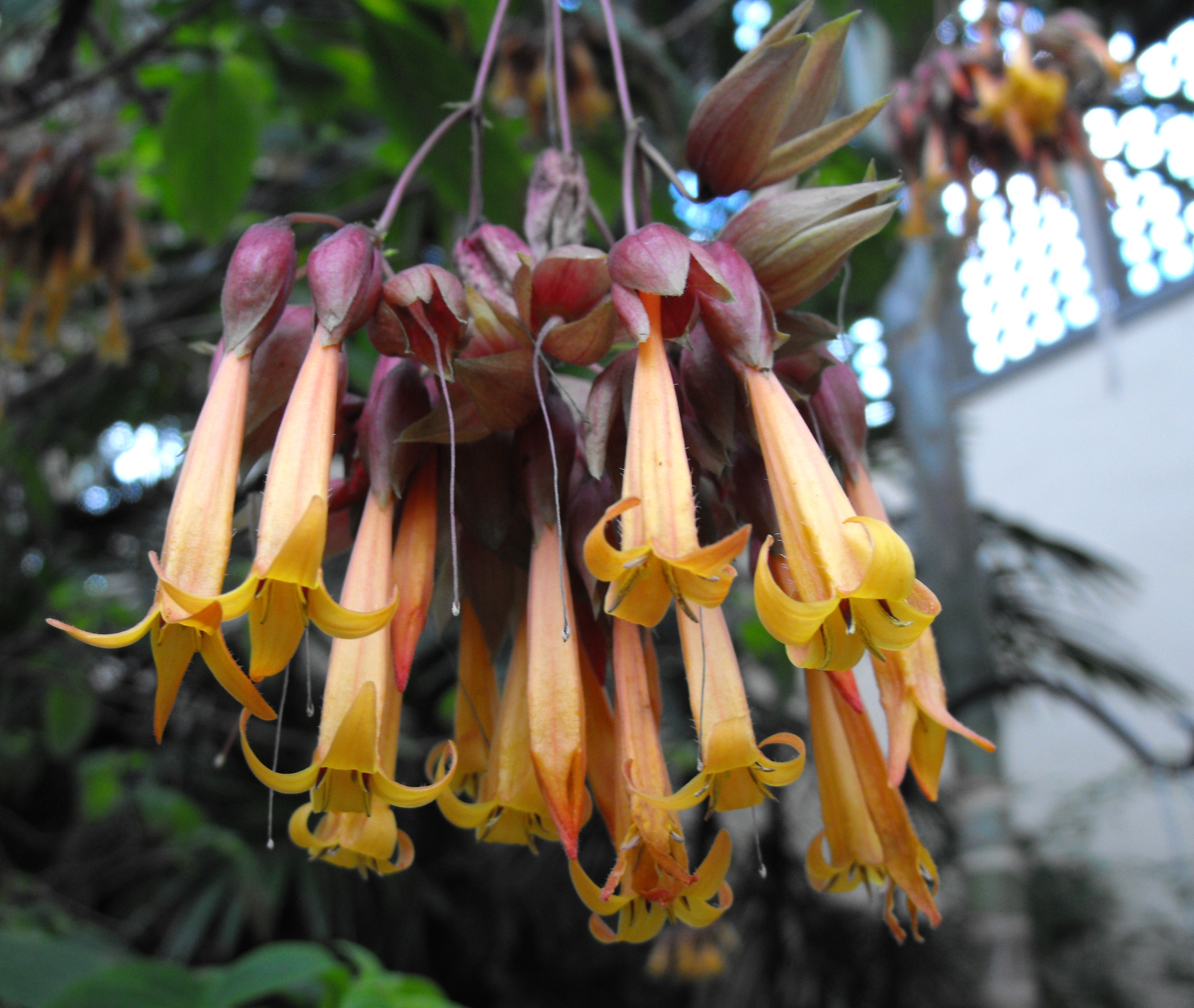
Deppea

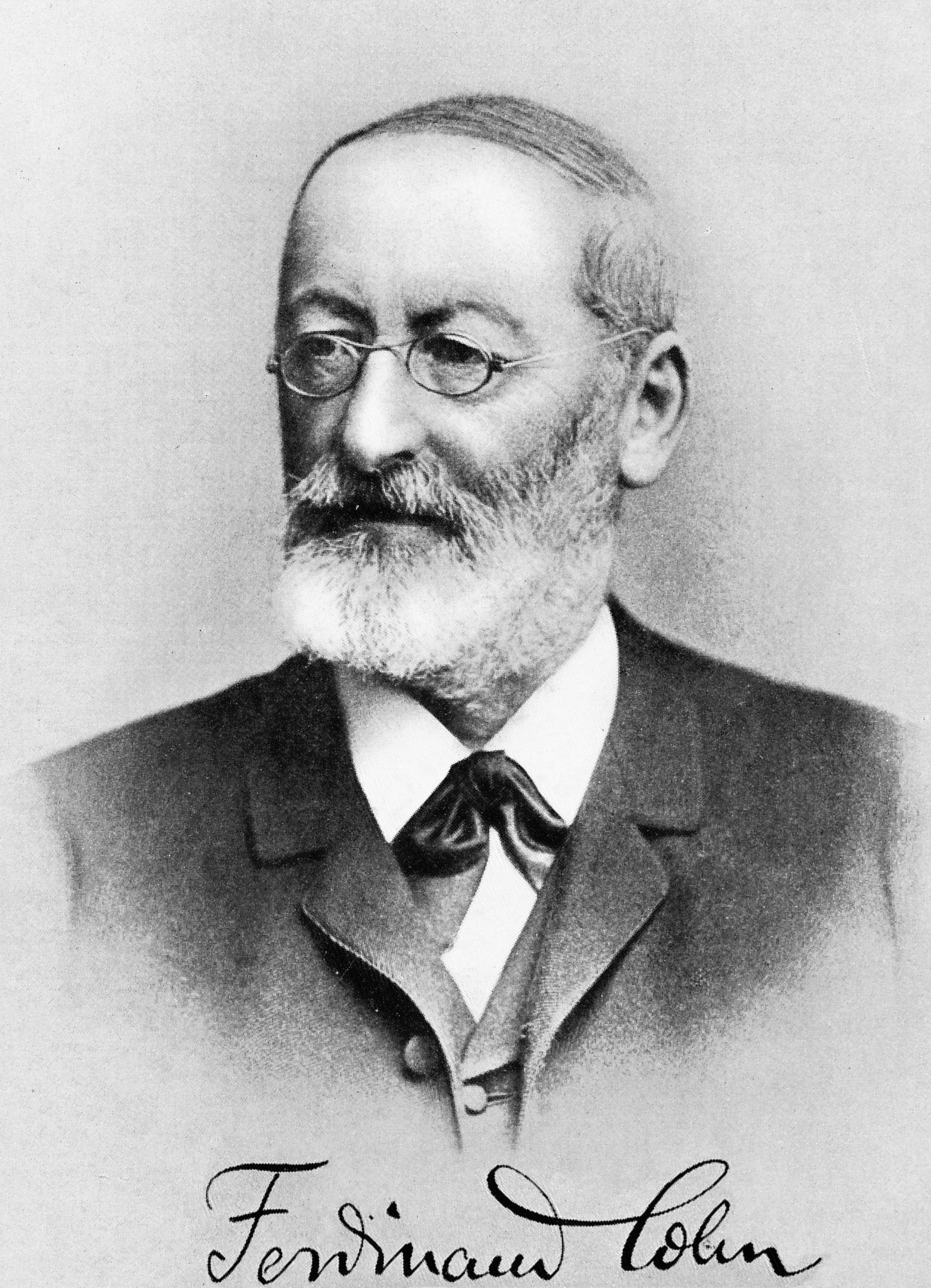
Ferdinand Cohn

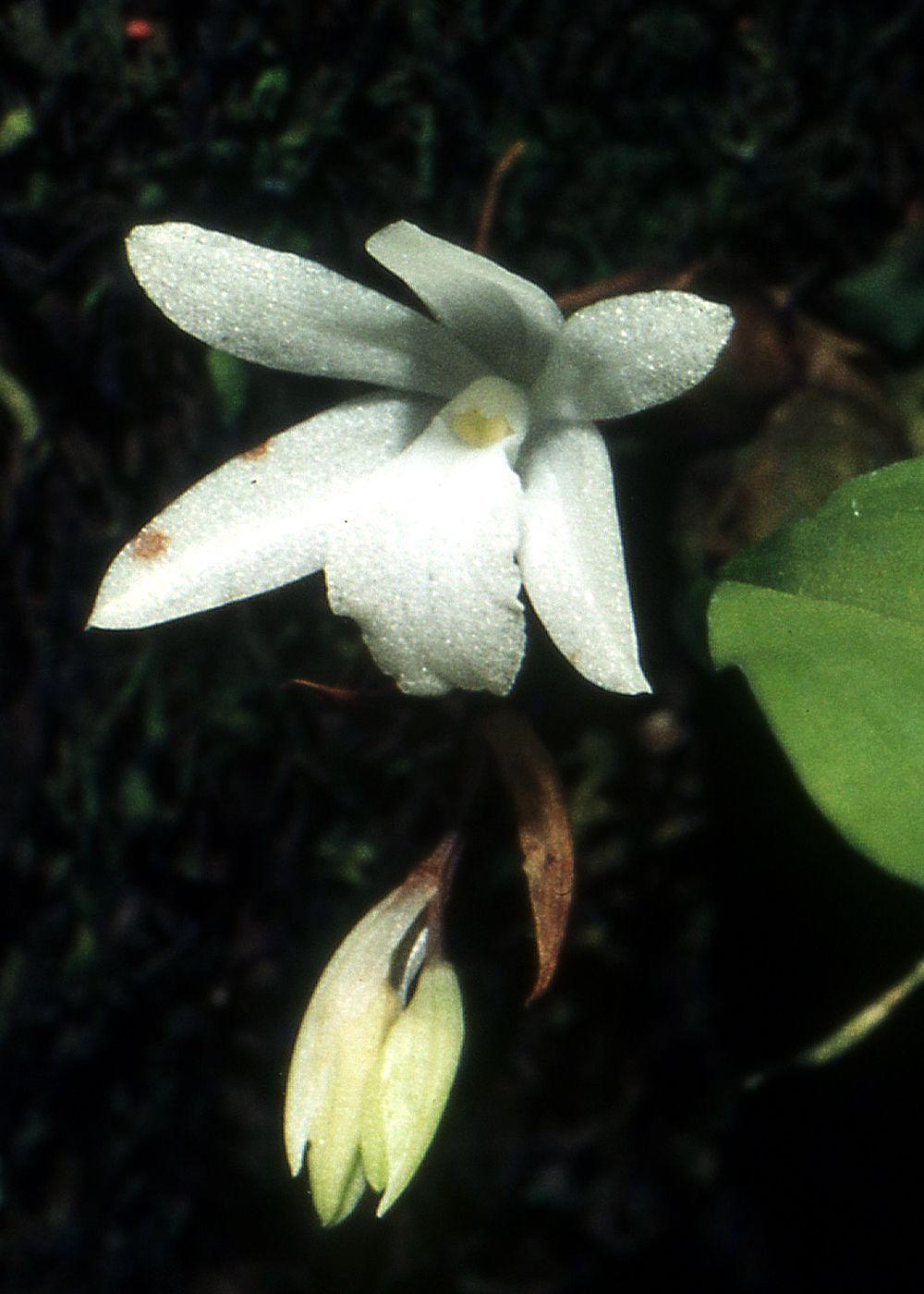
Dickasonia

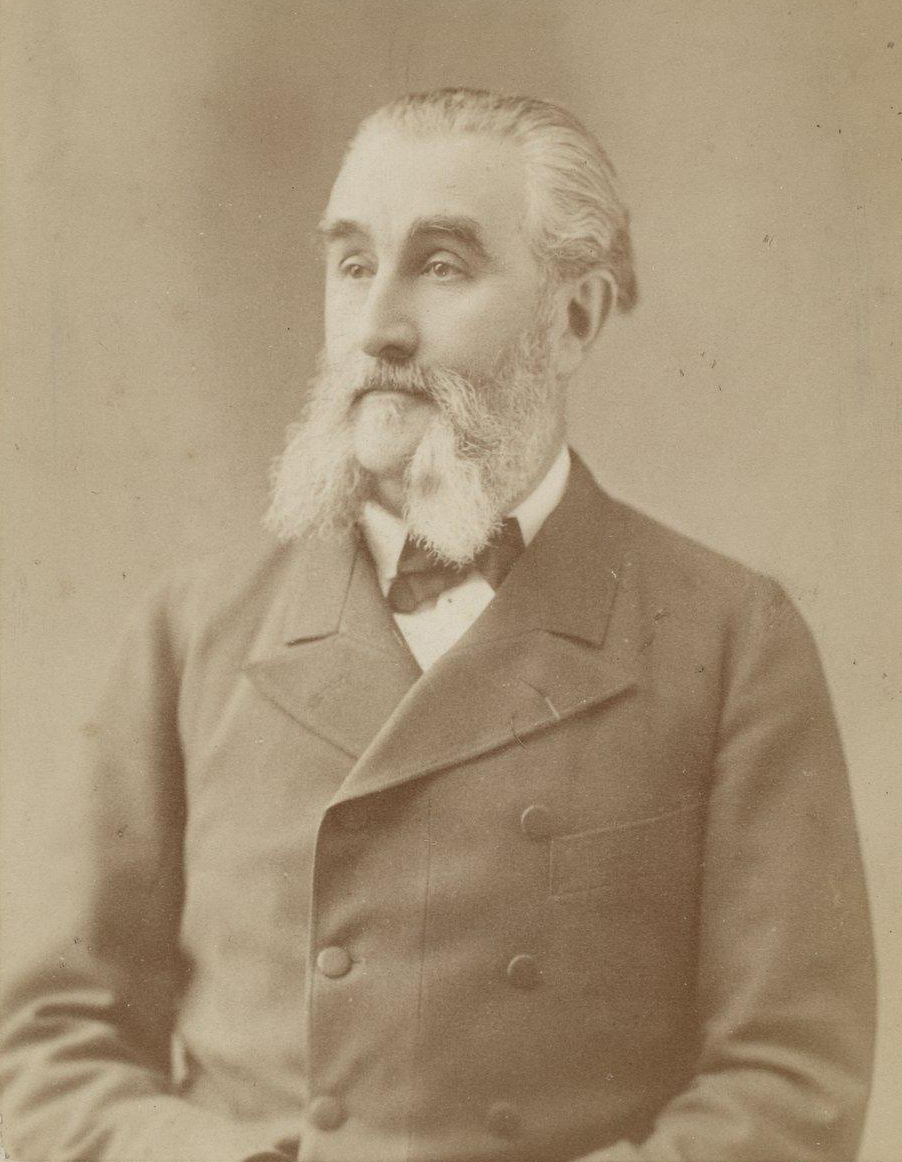
Alfred Grandidier

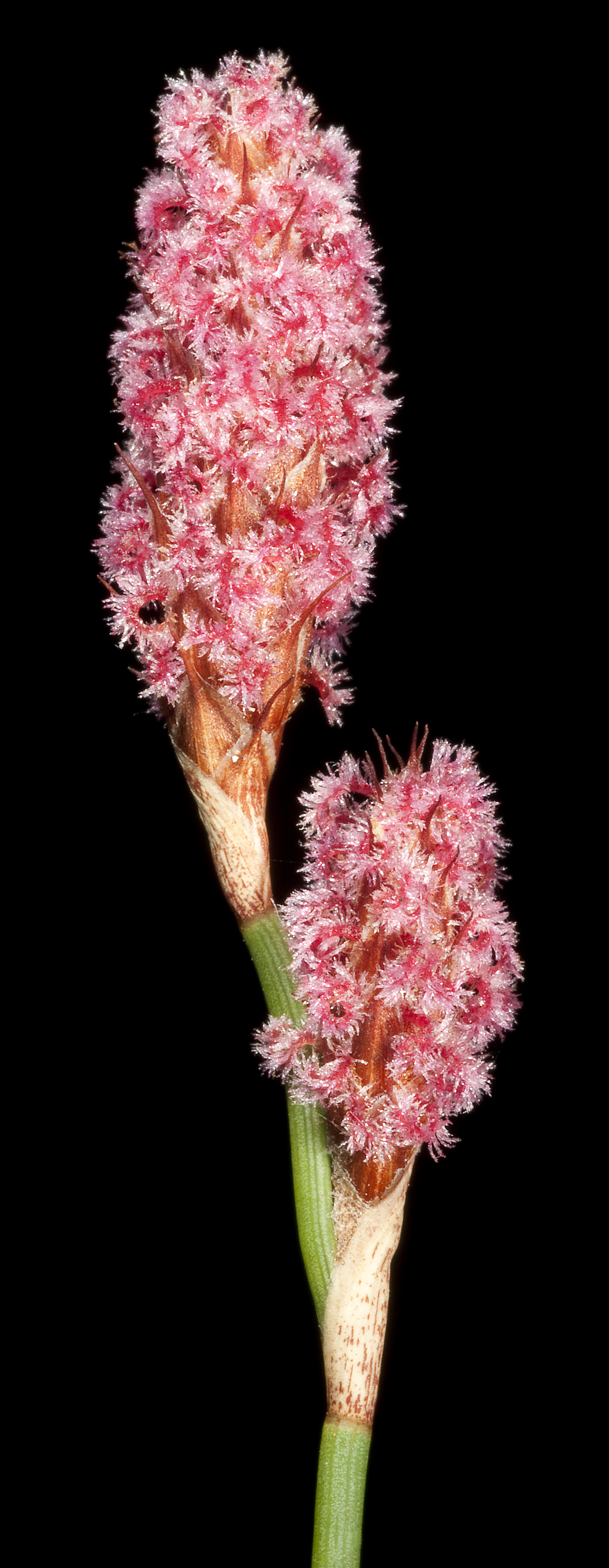
Dielsia

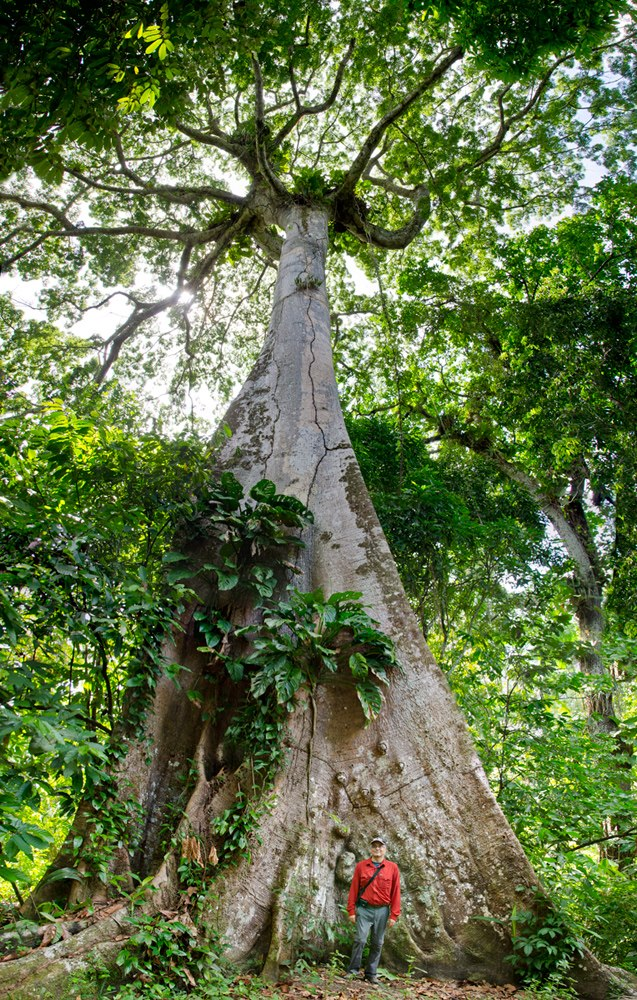
Dinizia

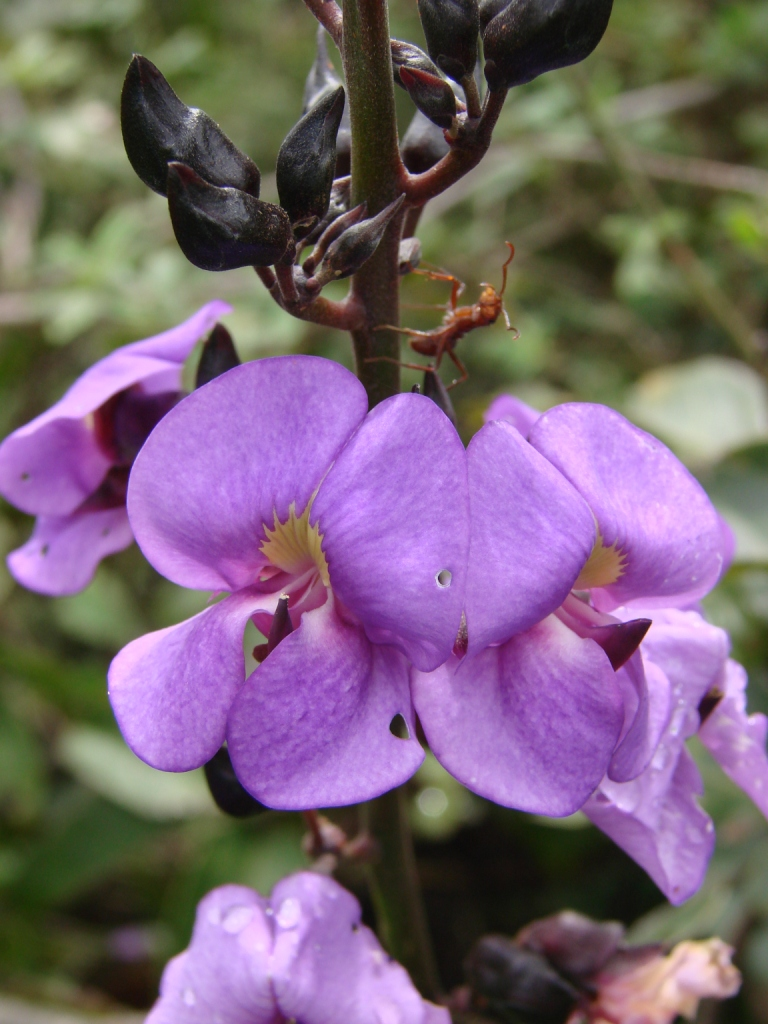
Dioclea

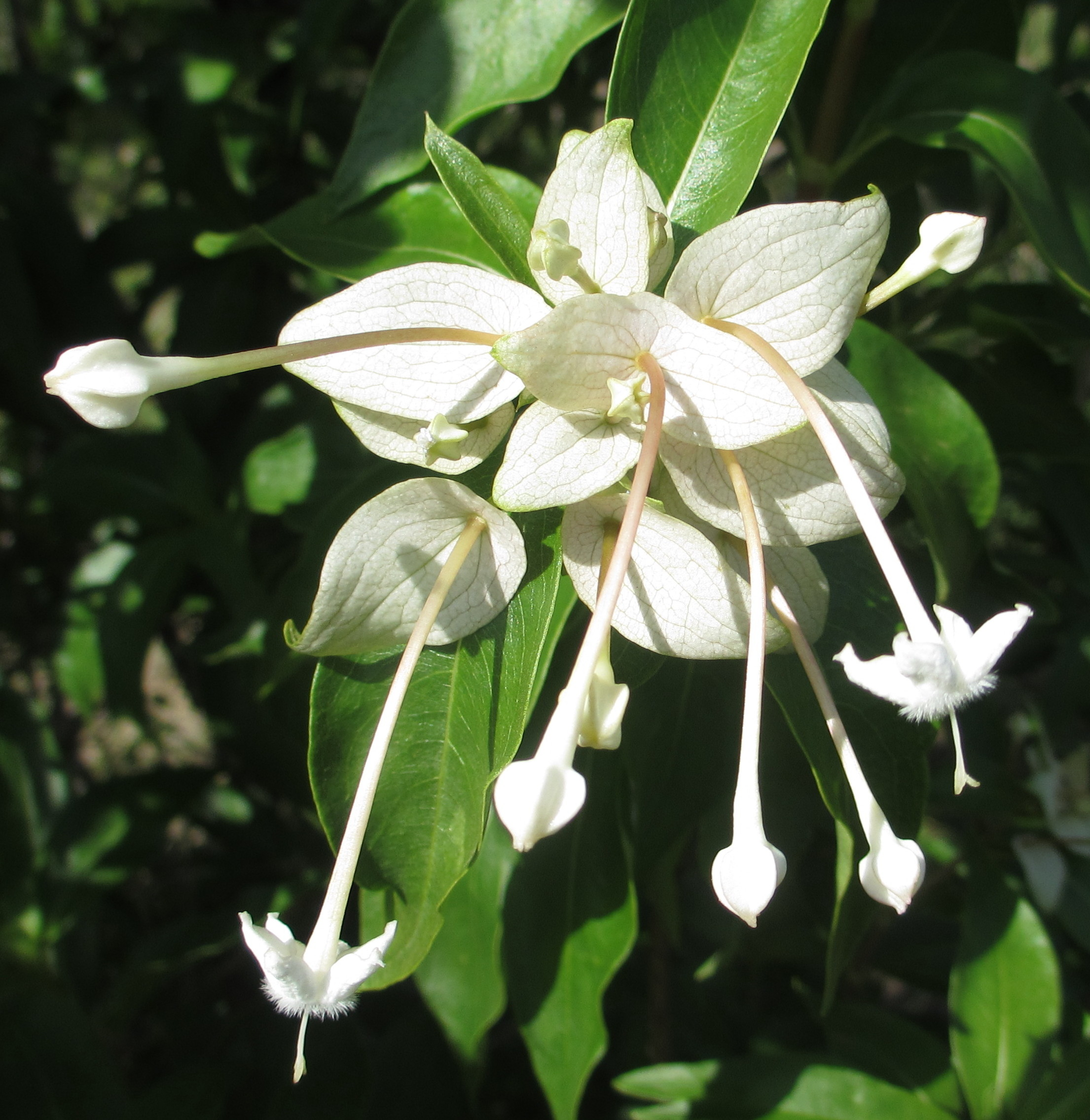
Dirichletia

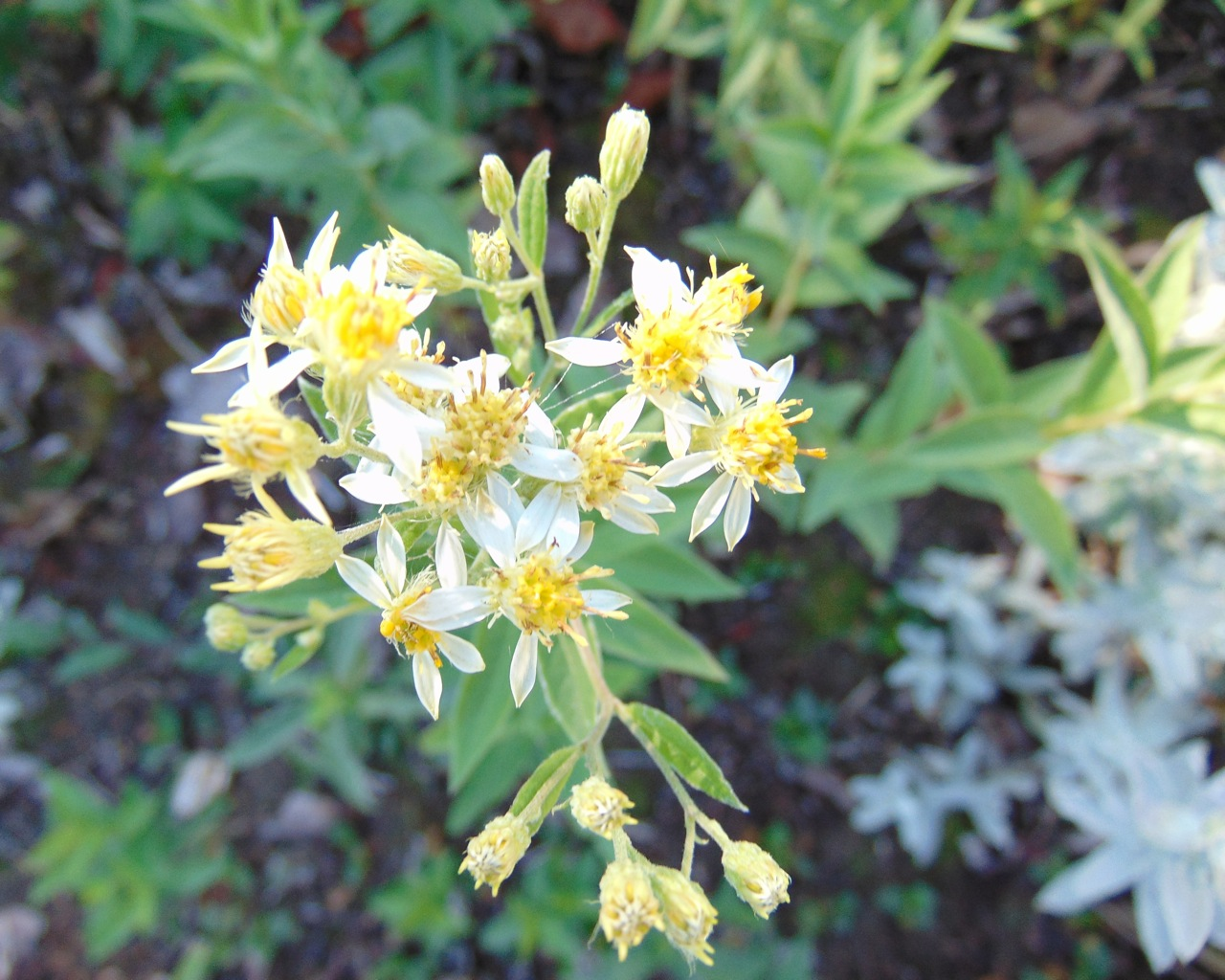
Doellingeria

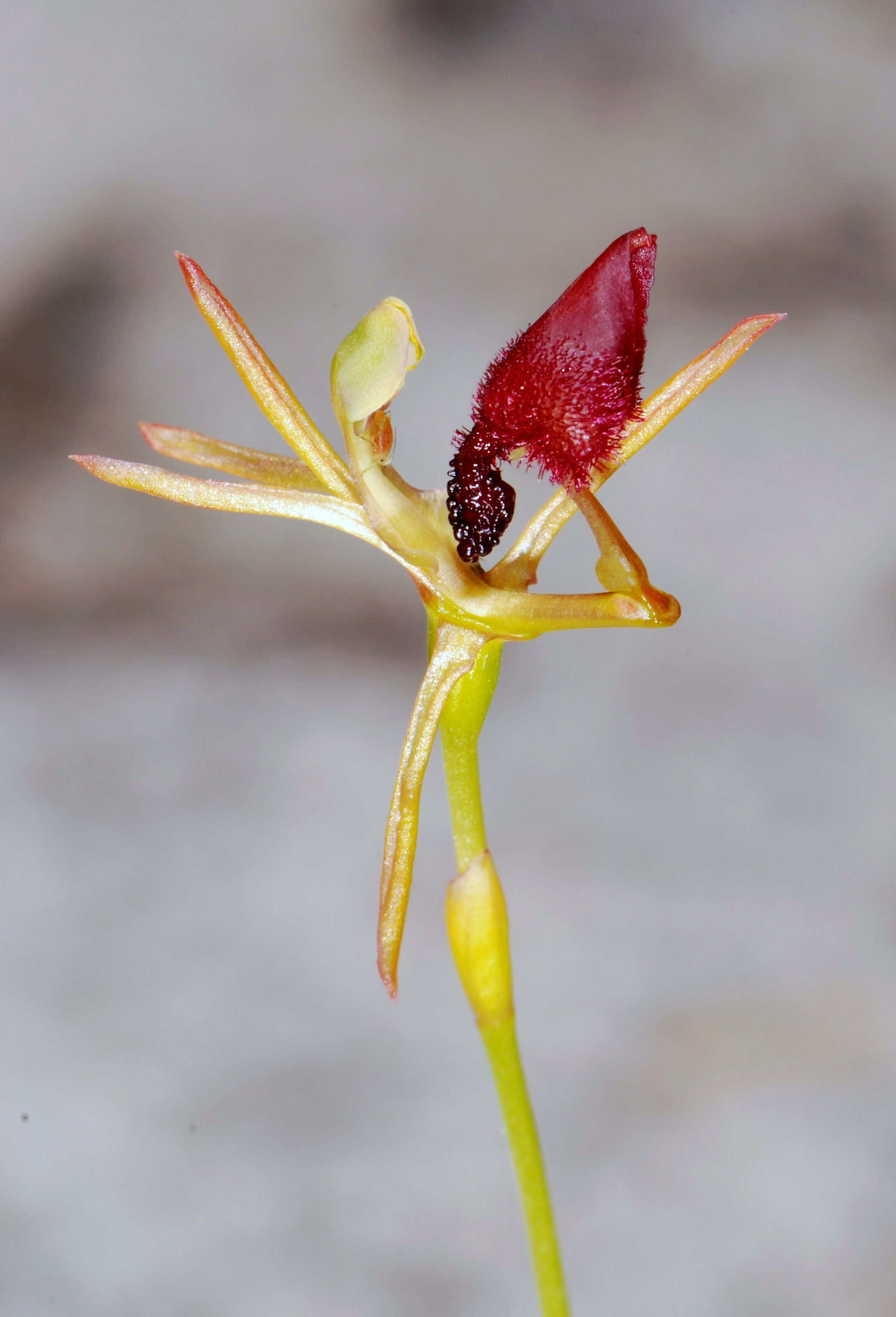
Drakaea

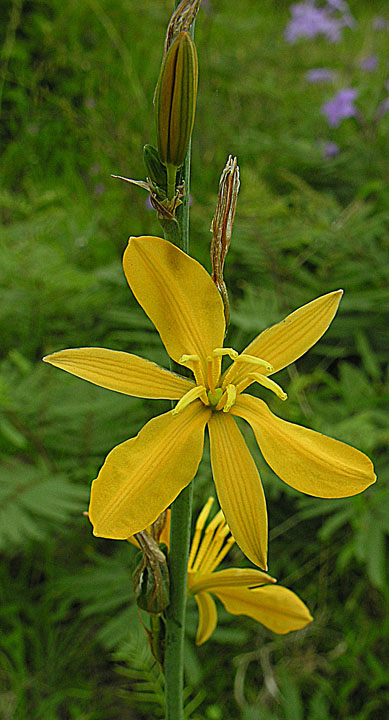
Echeandia

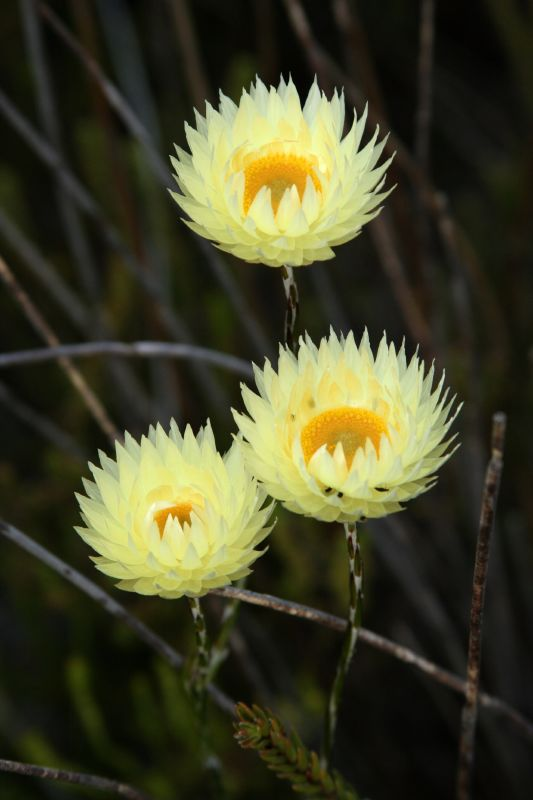
Edmondia

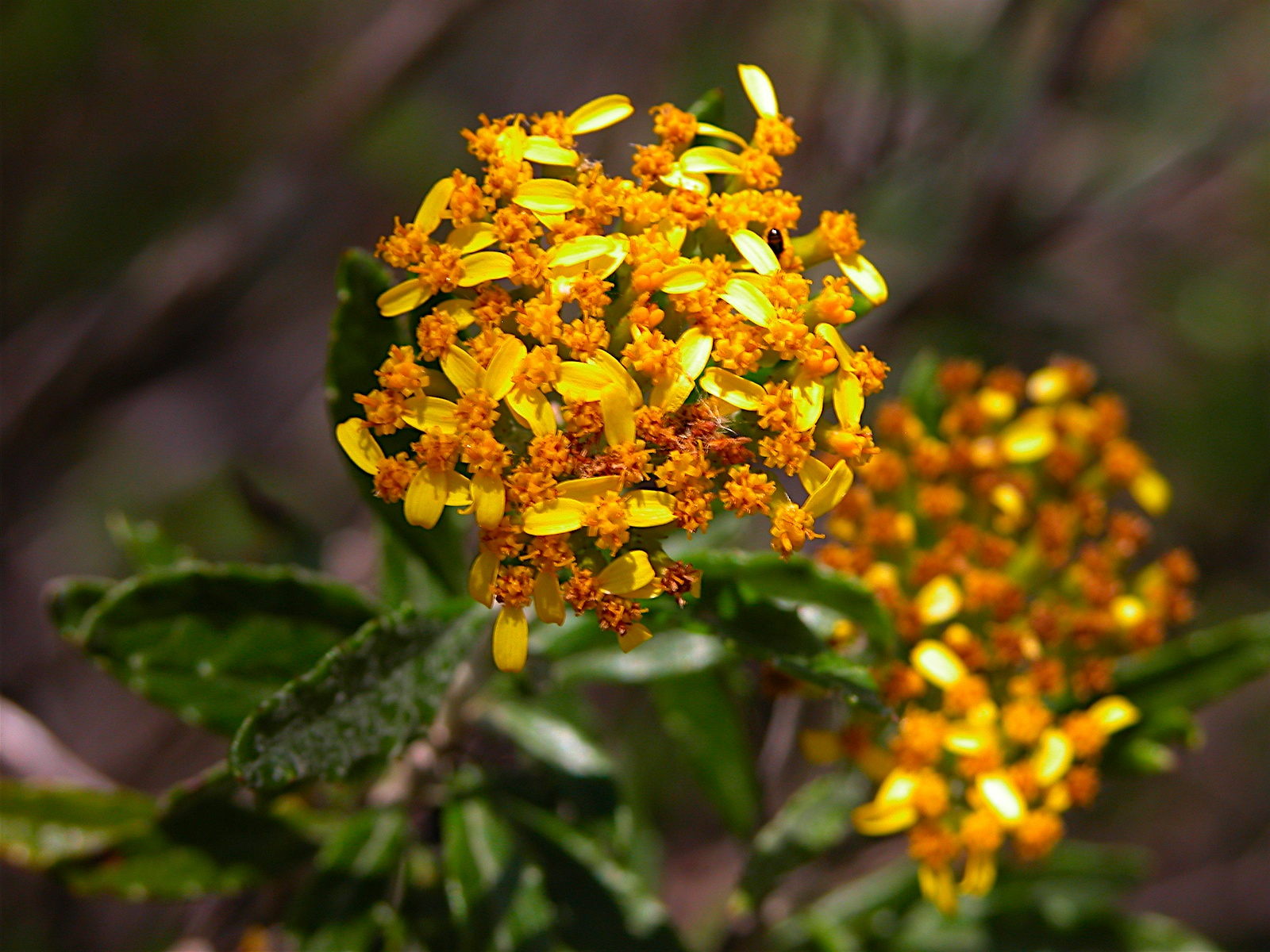
Elekmania

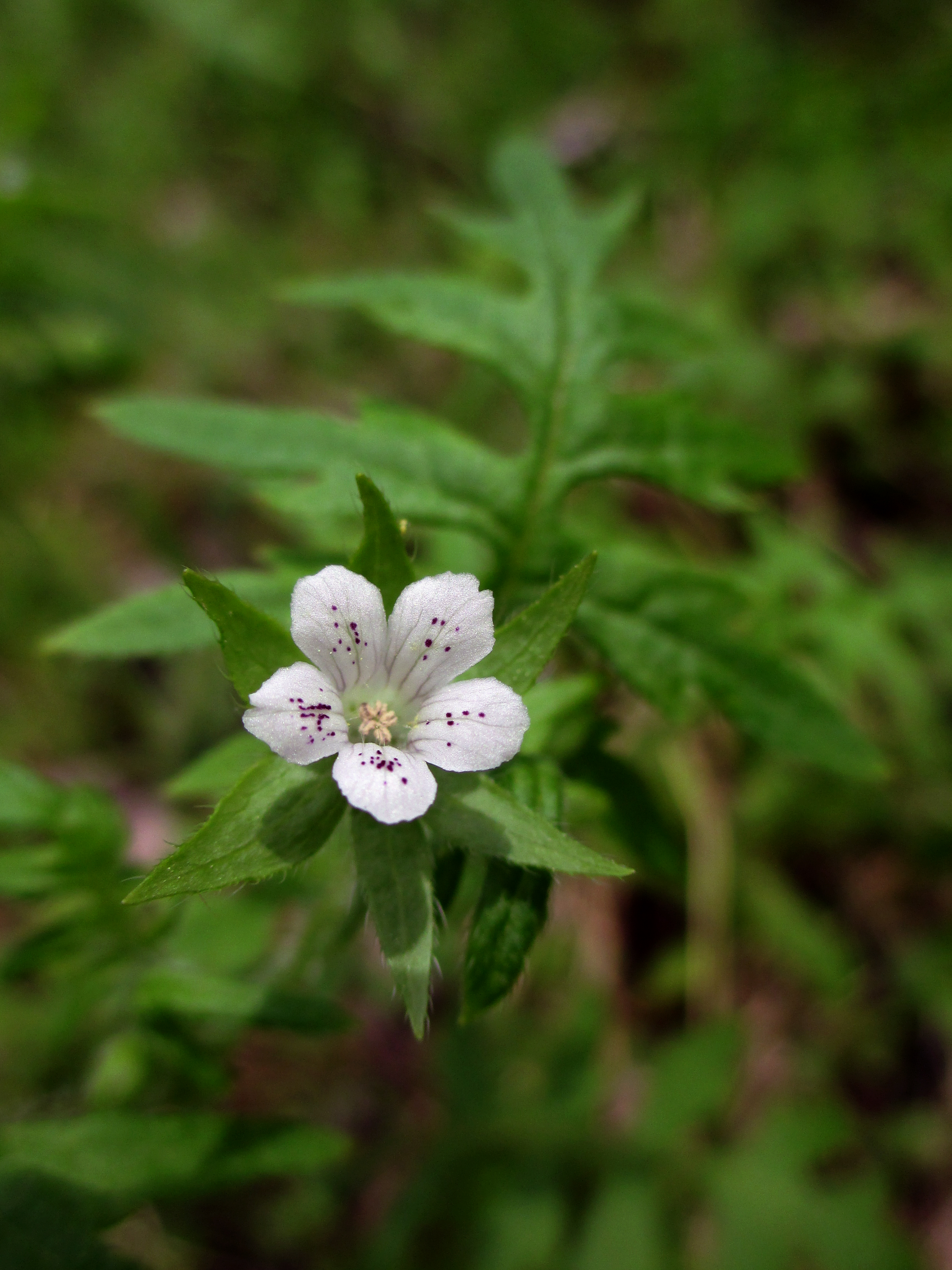
Ellisia

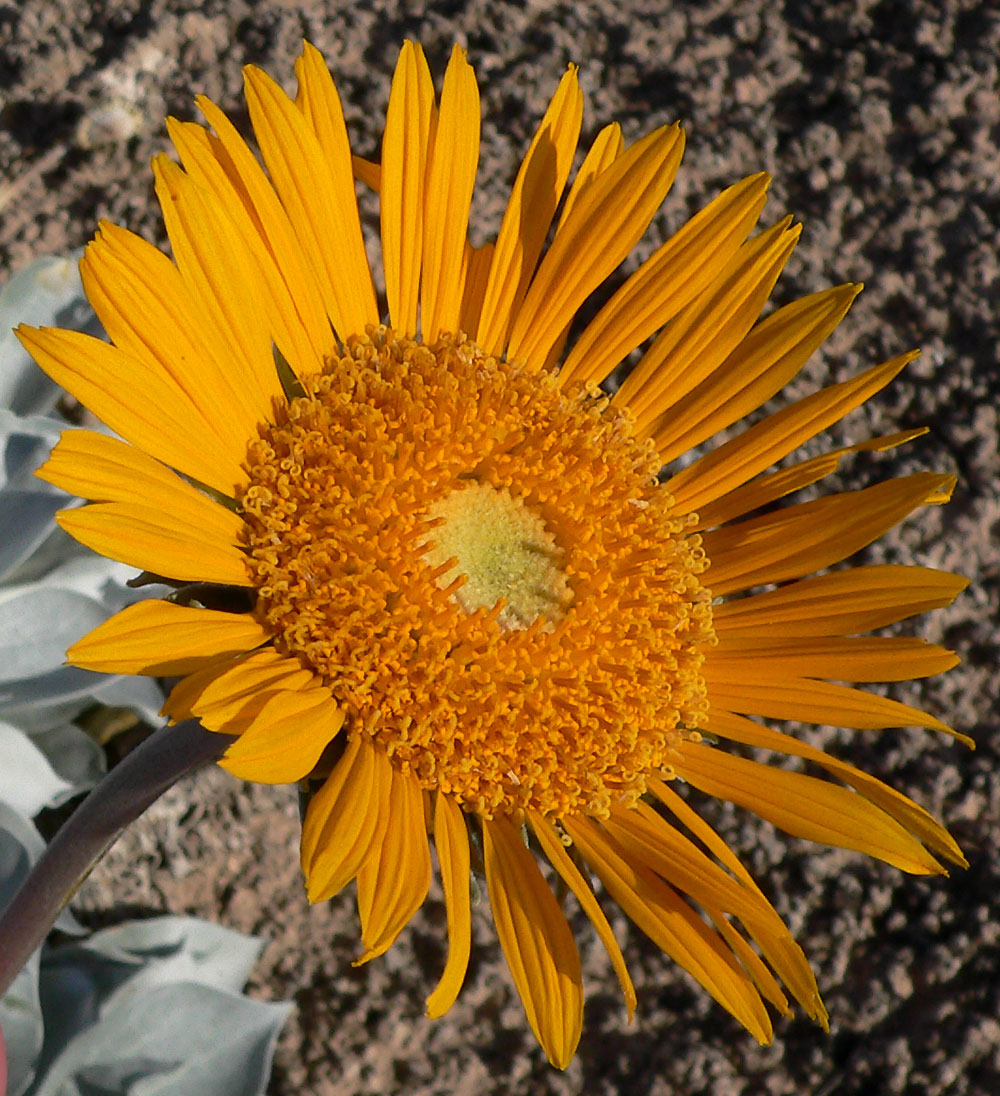
Enceliopsis

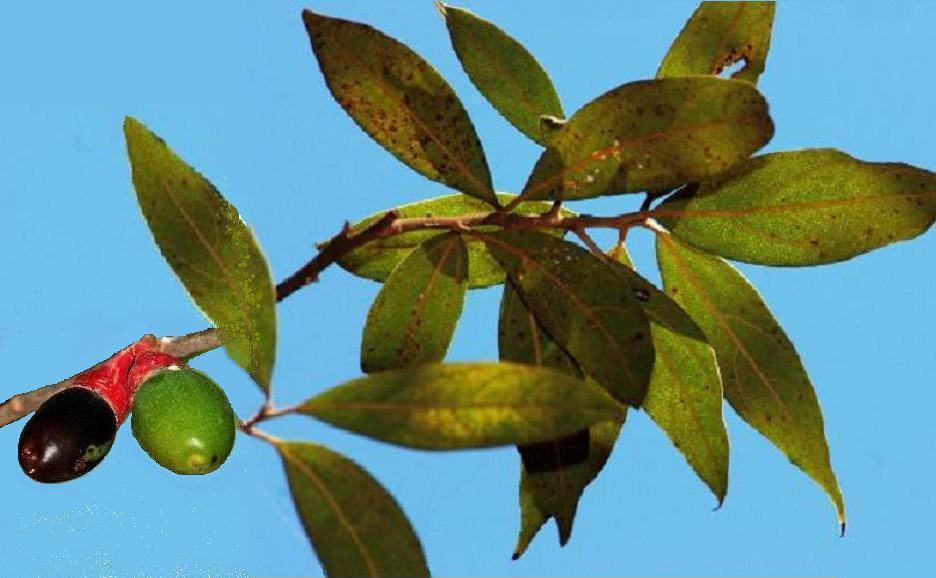
Endlicheria

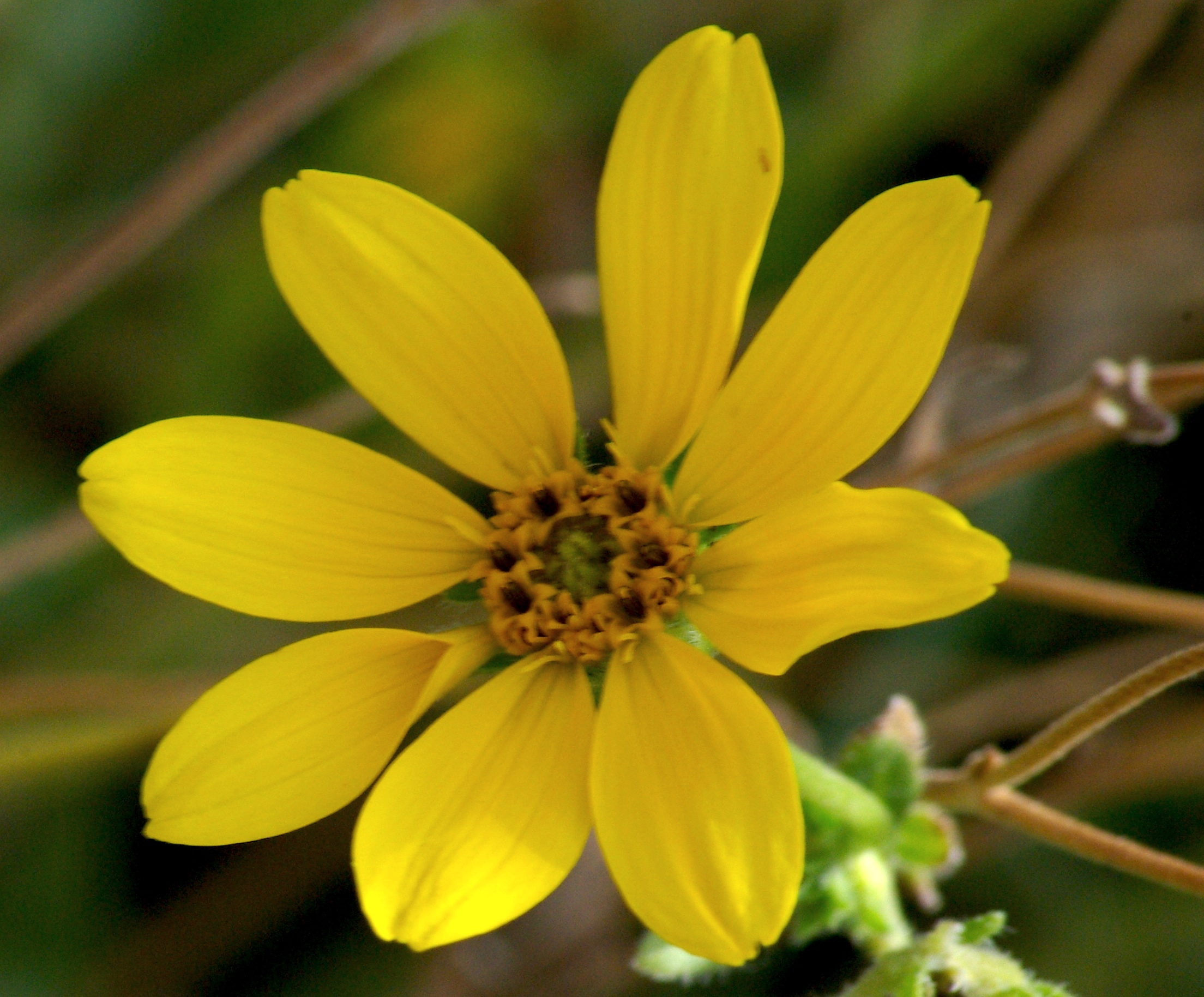
Engelmannia

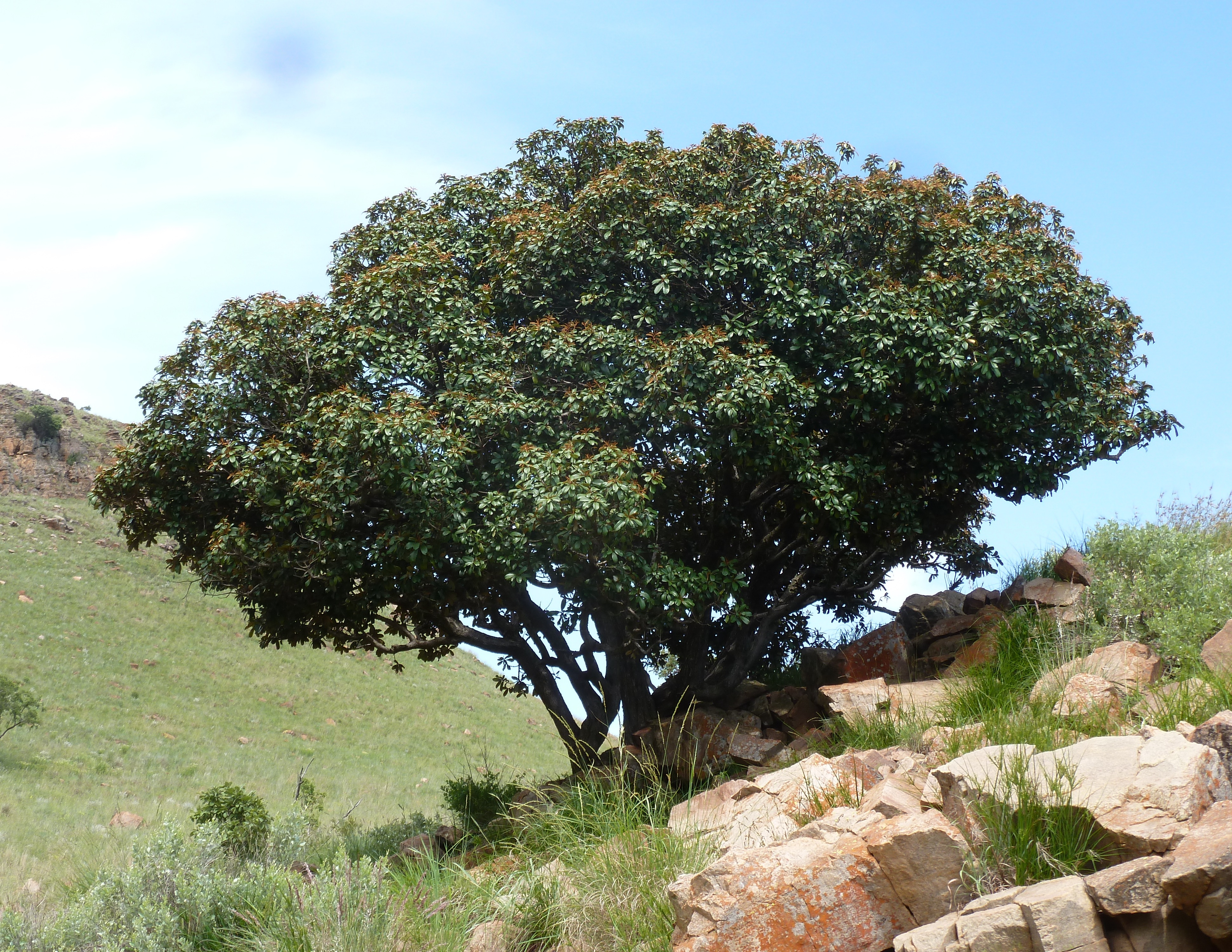
Englerophytum

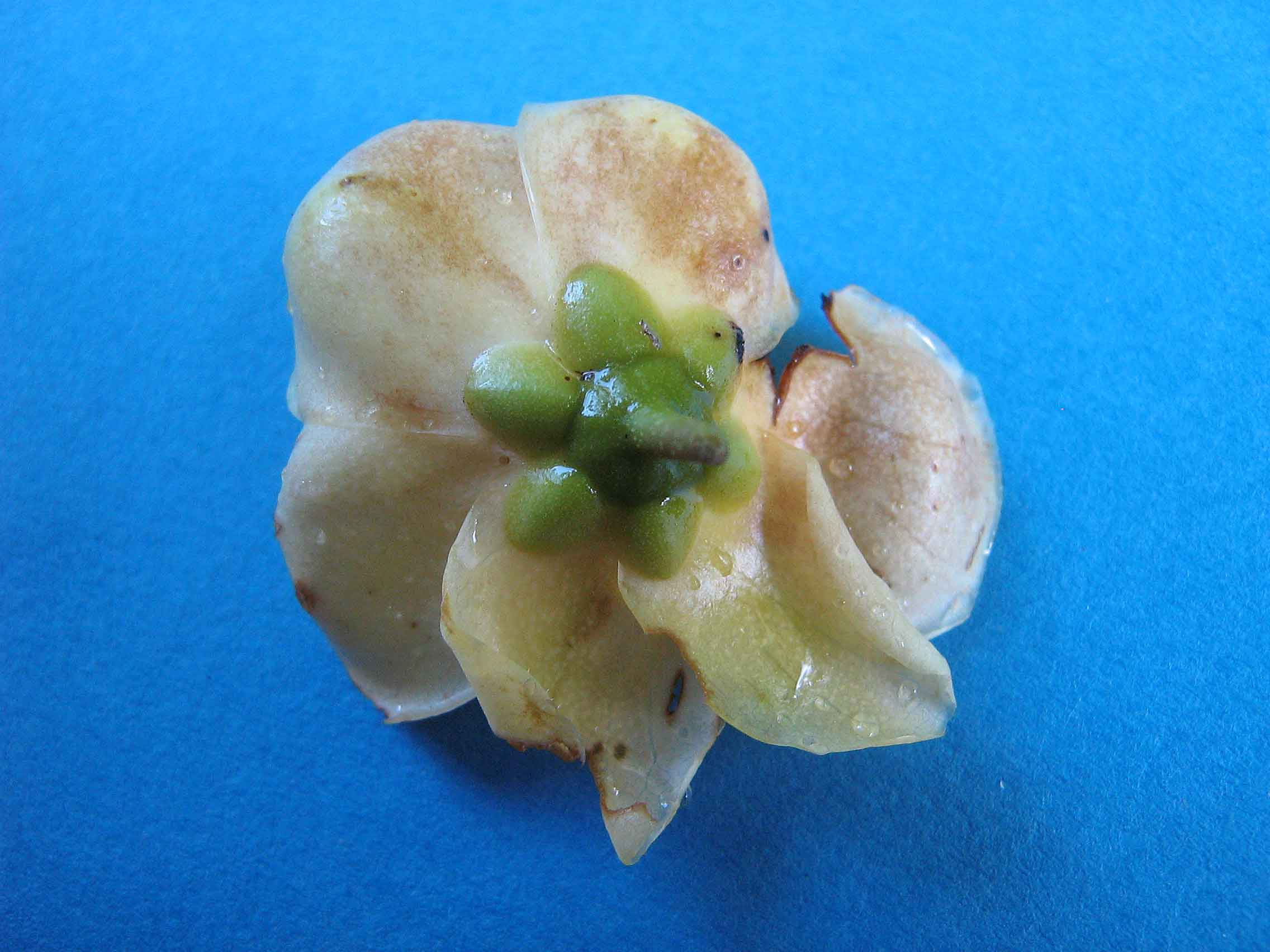
Eschweilera

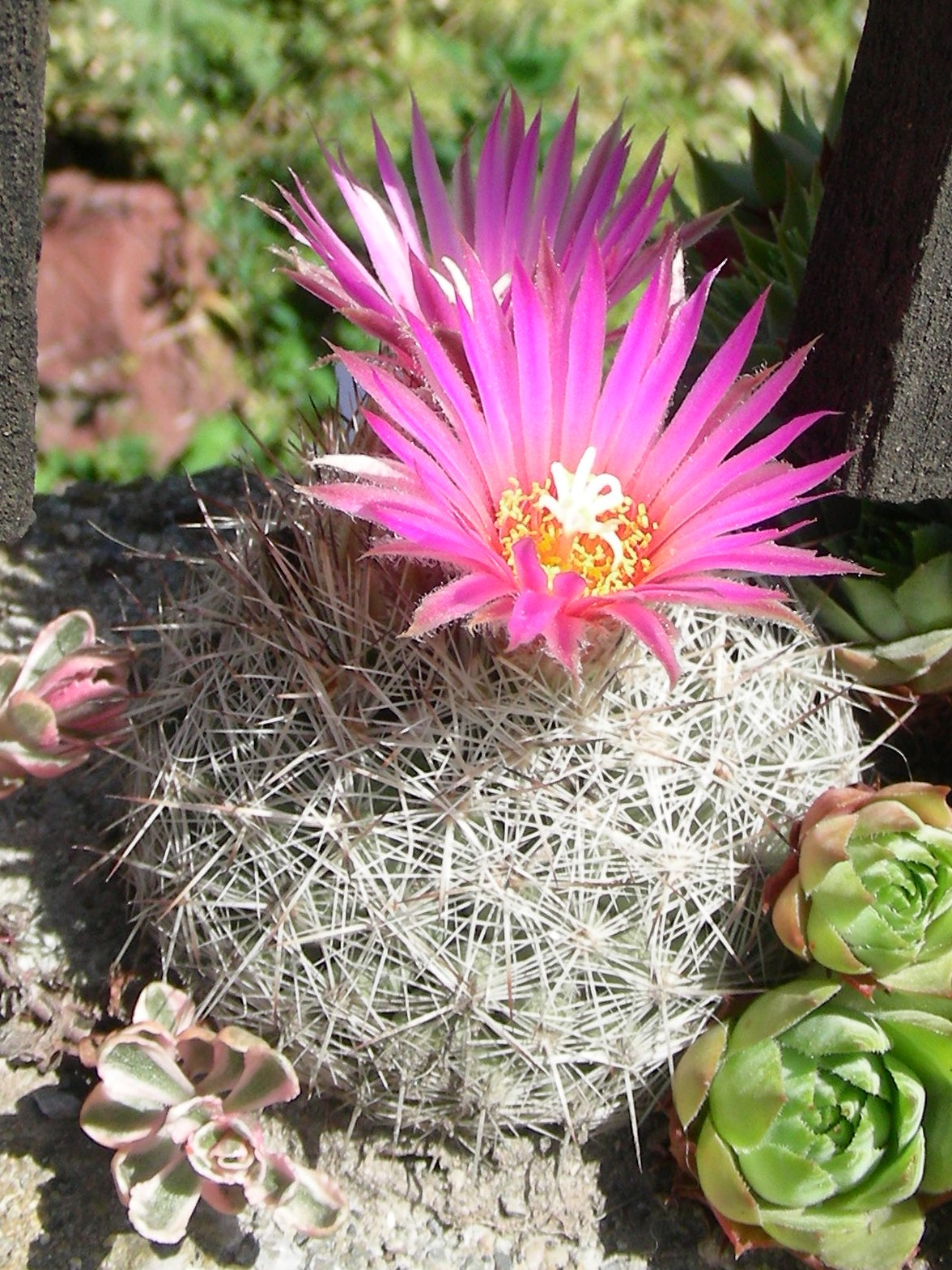
Escobaria

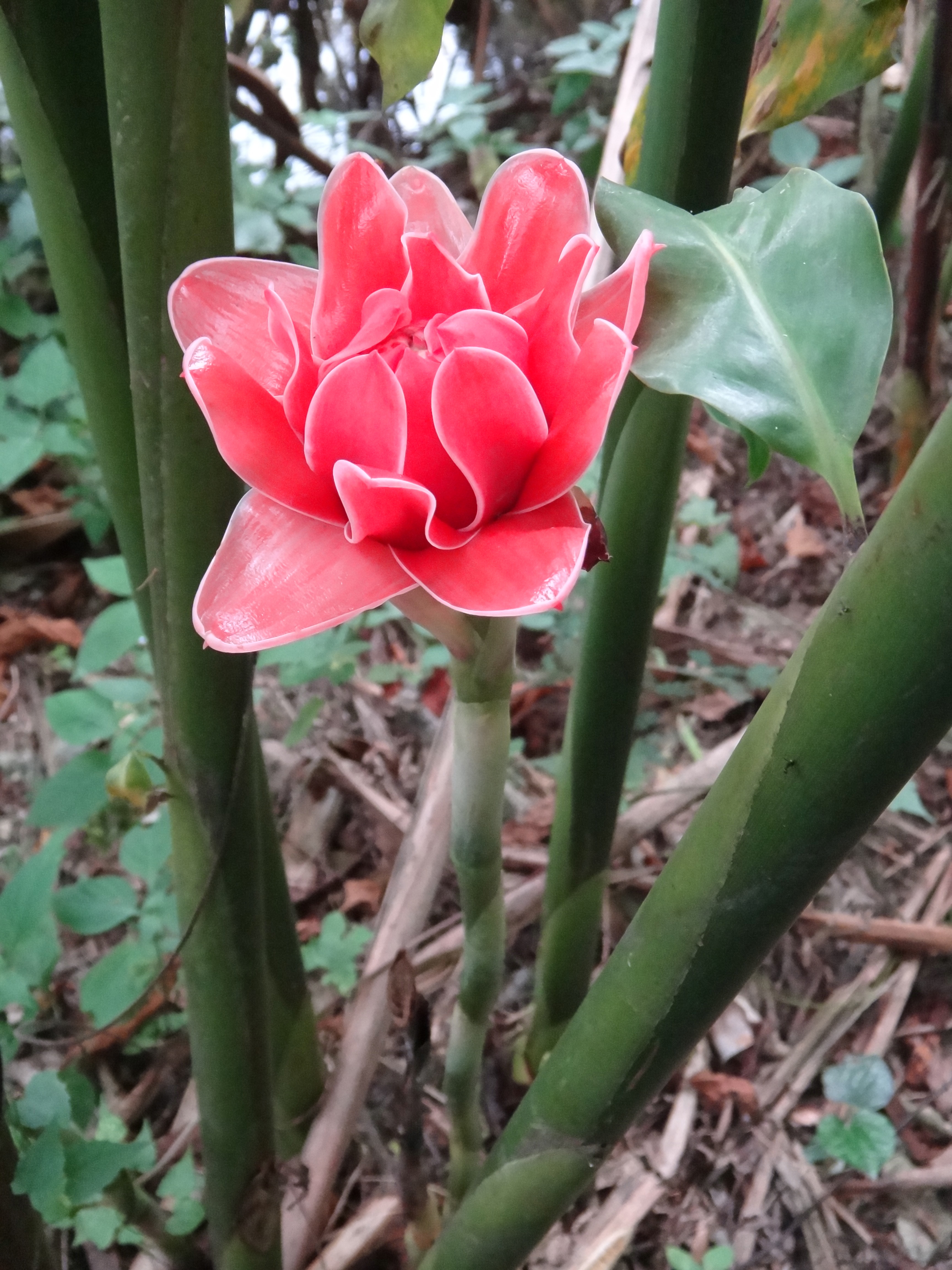
Etlingera

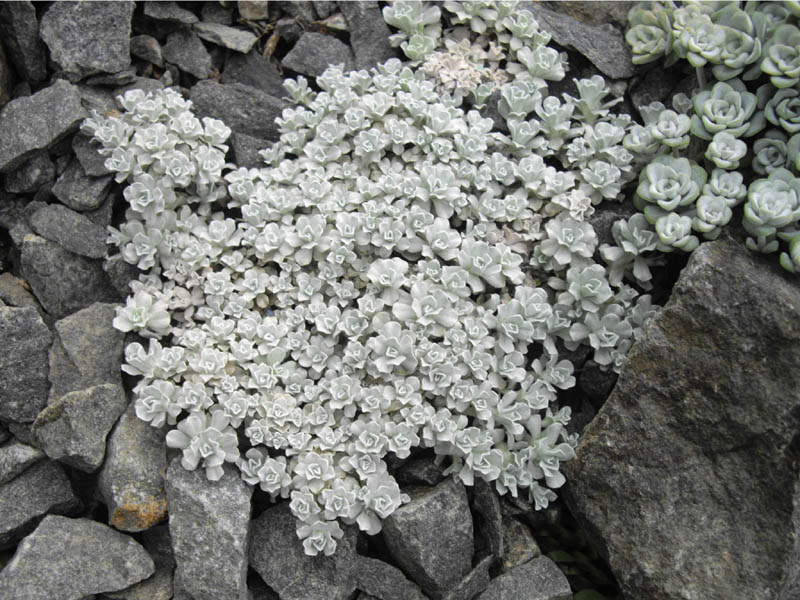
Ewartia

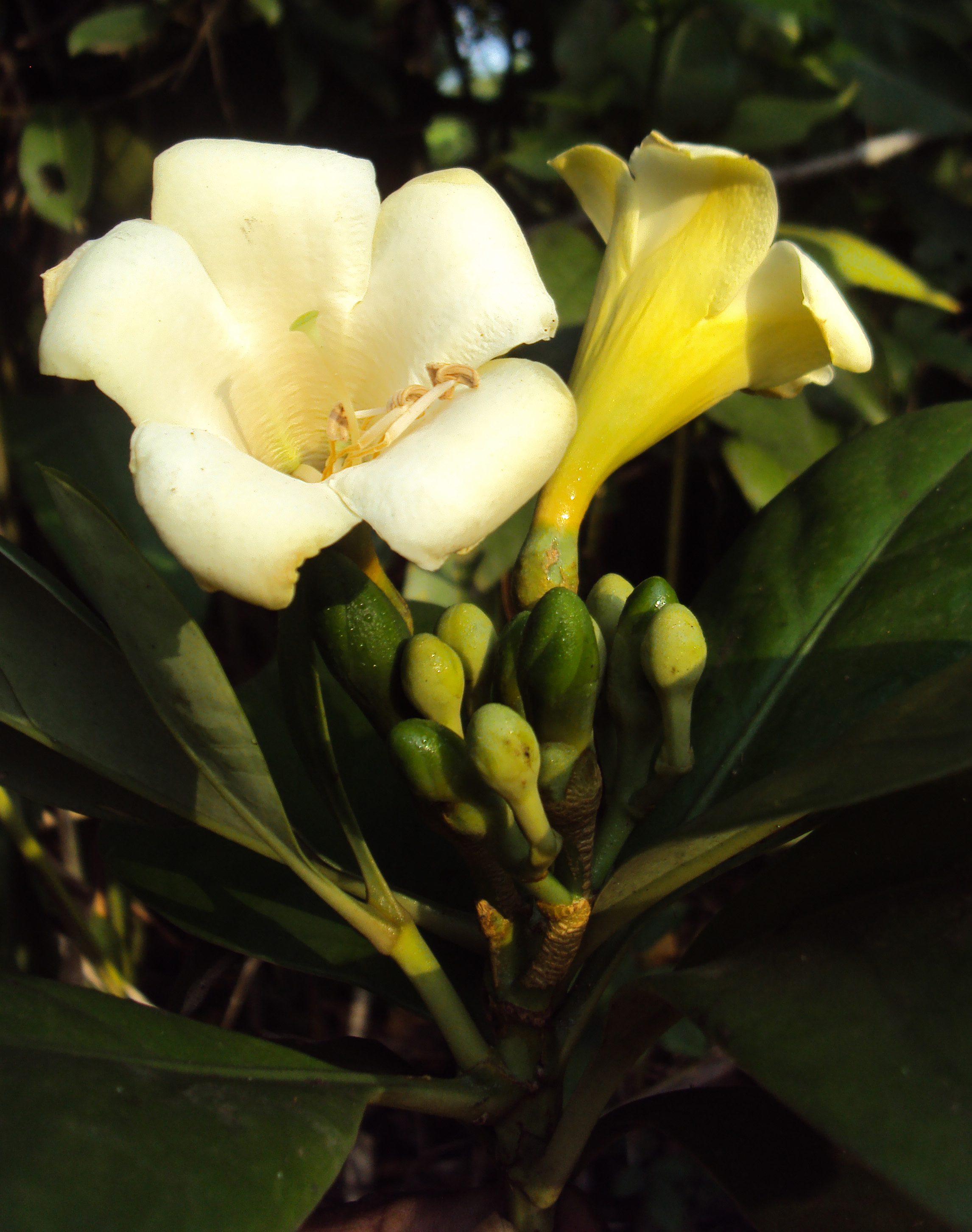
Fagraea

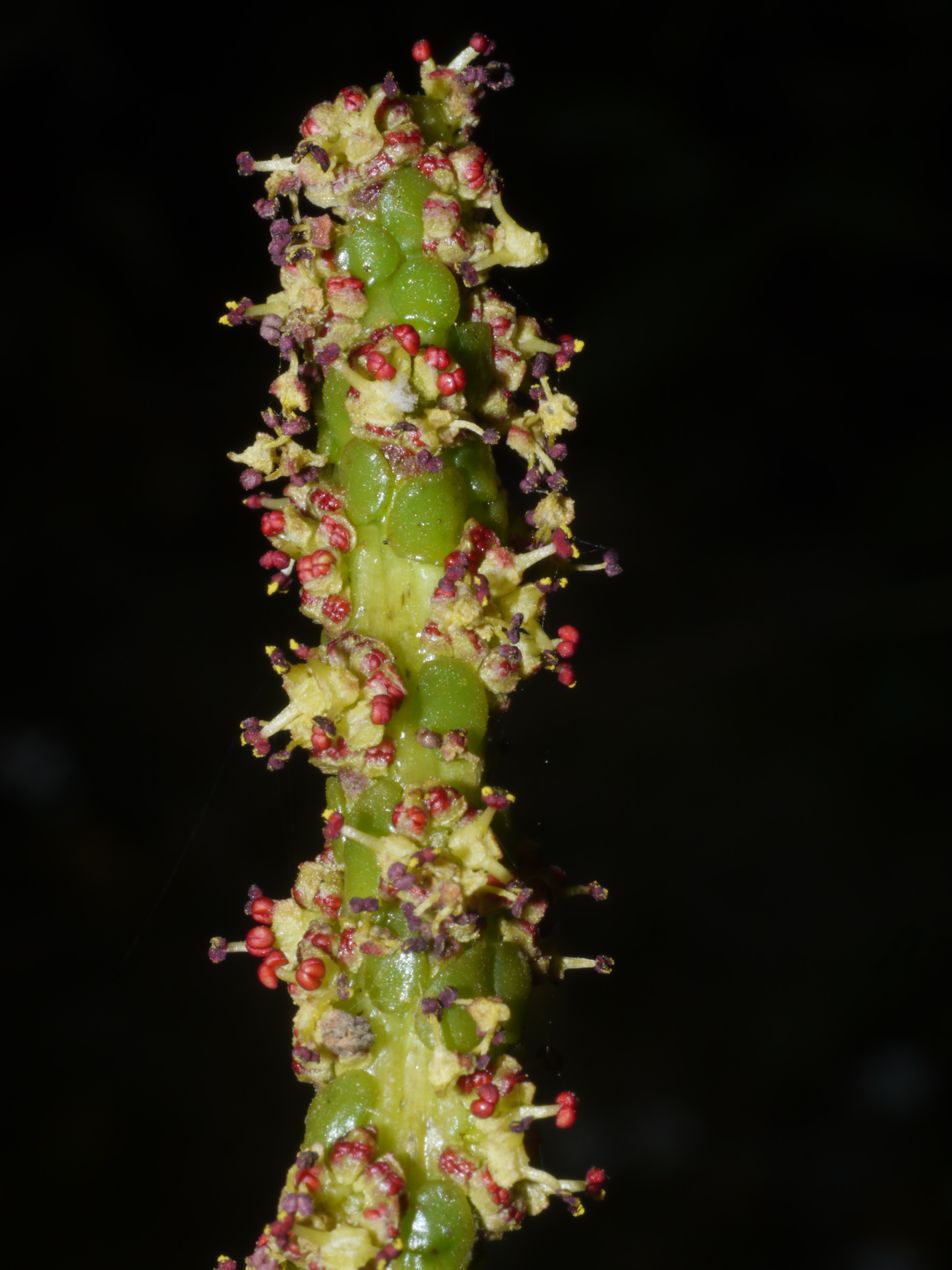
Falconeria

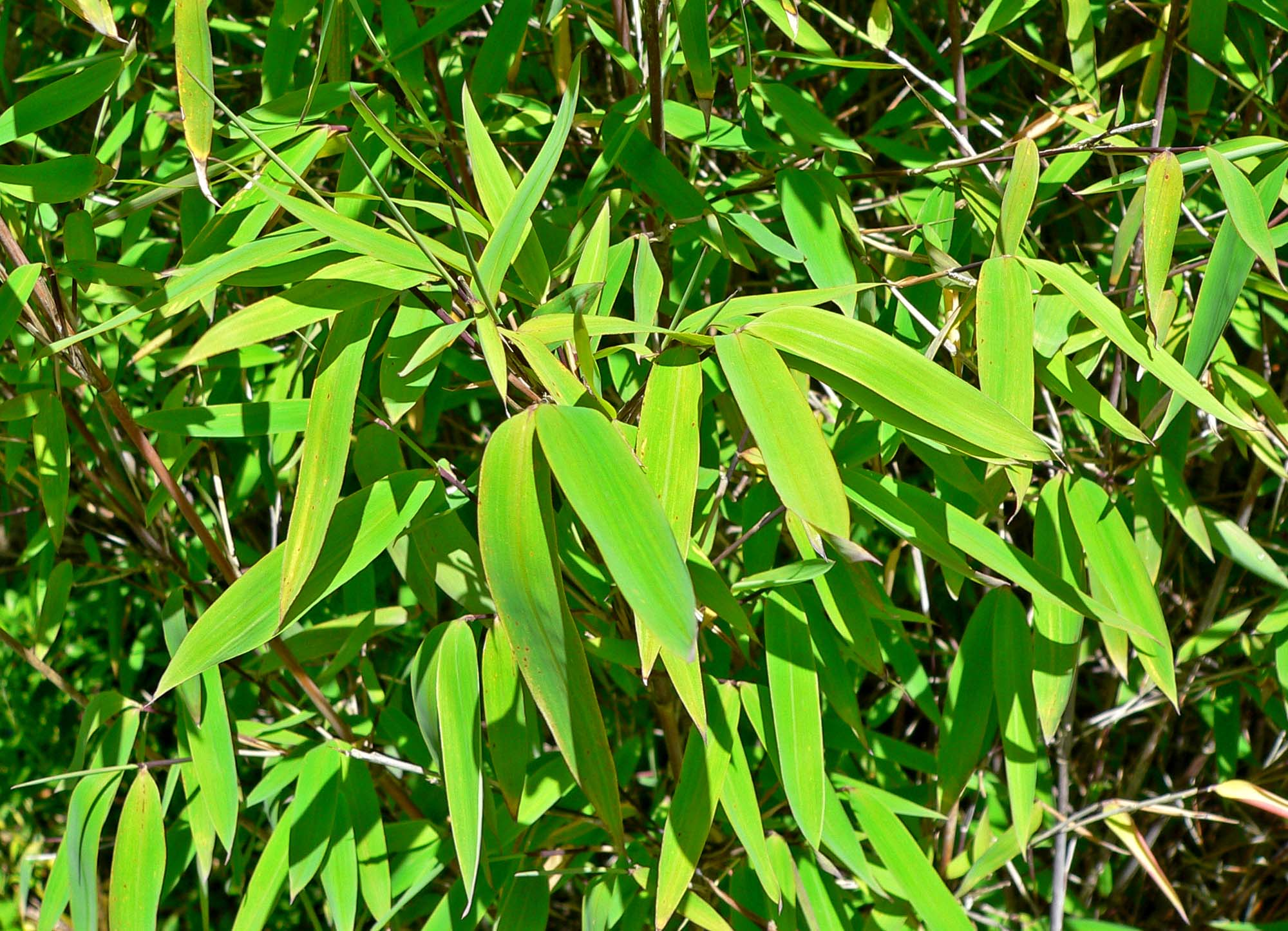
Fargesia

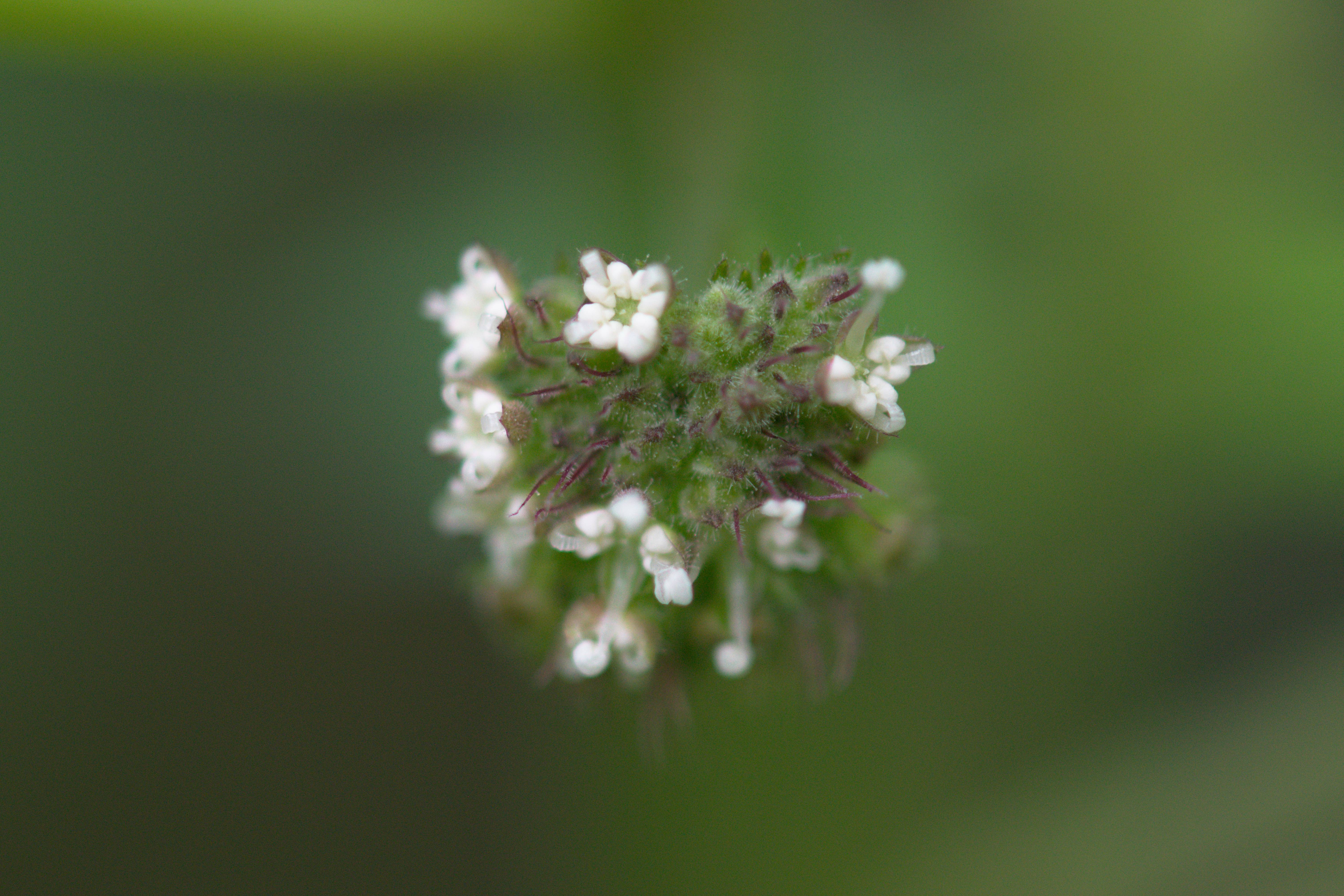
Fatoua

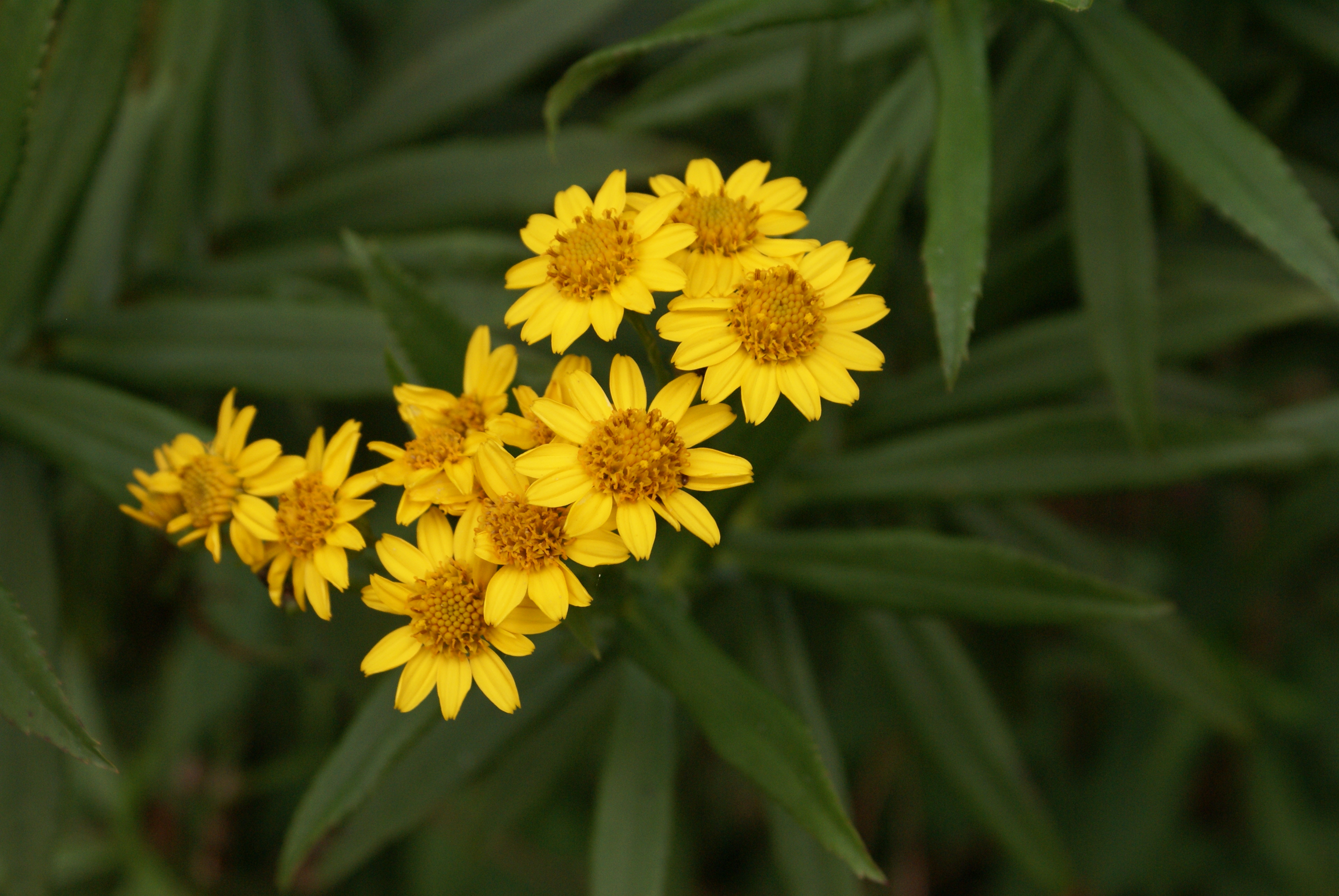
Faujasia

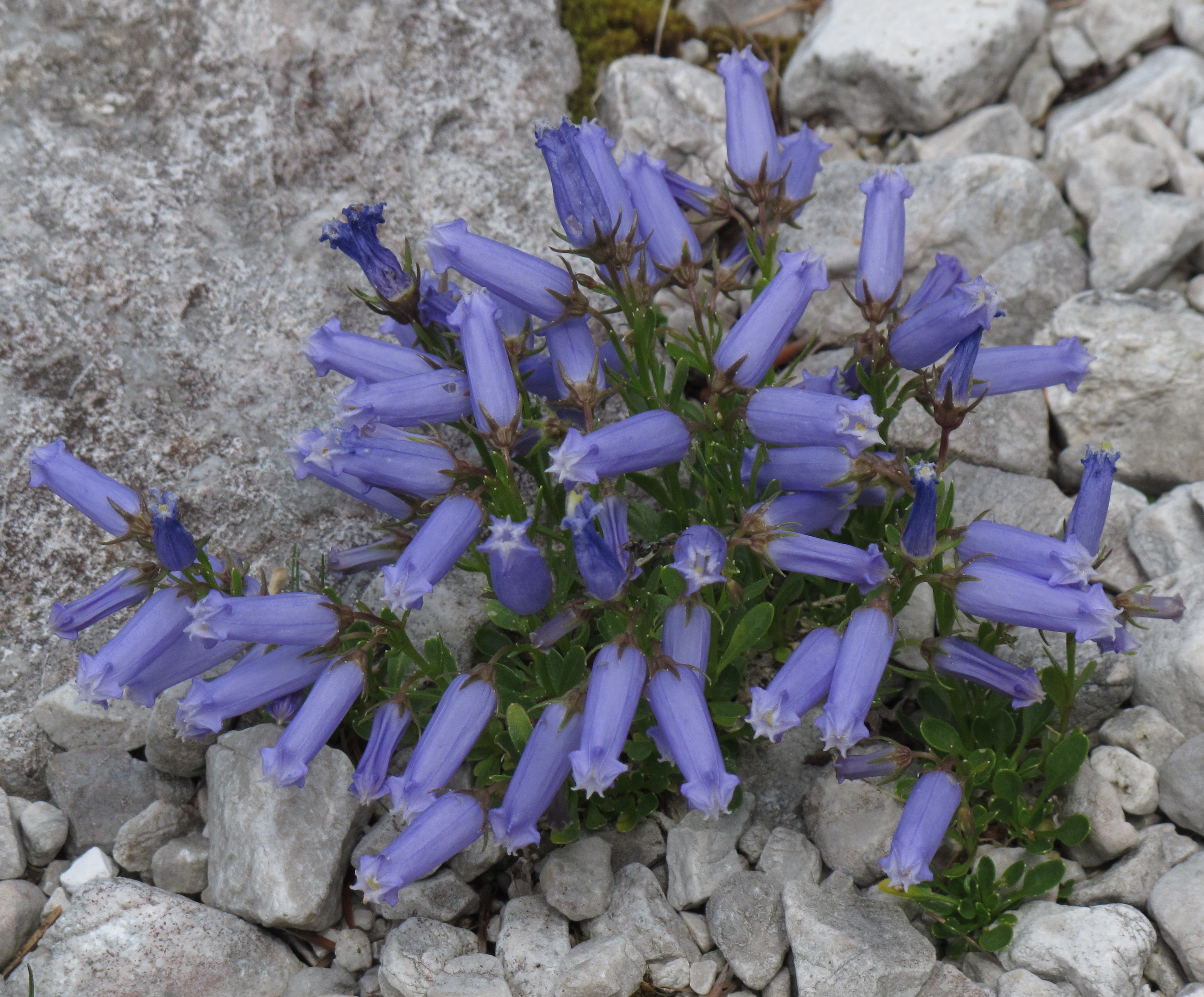
Favratia

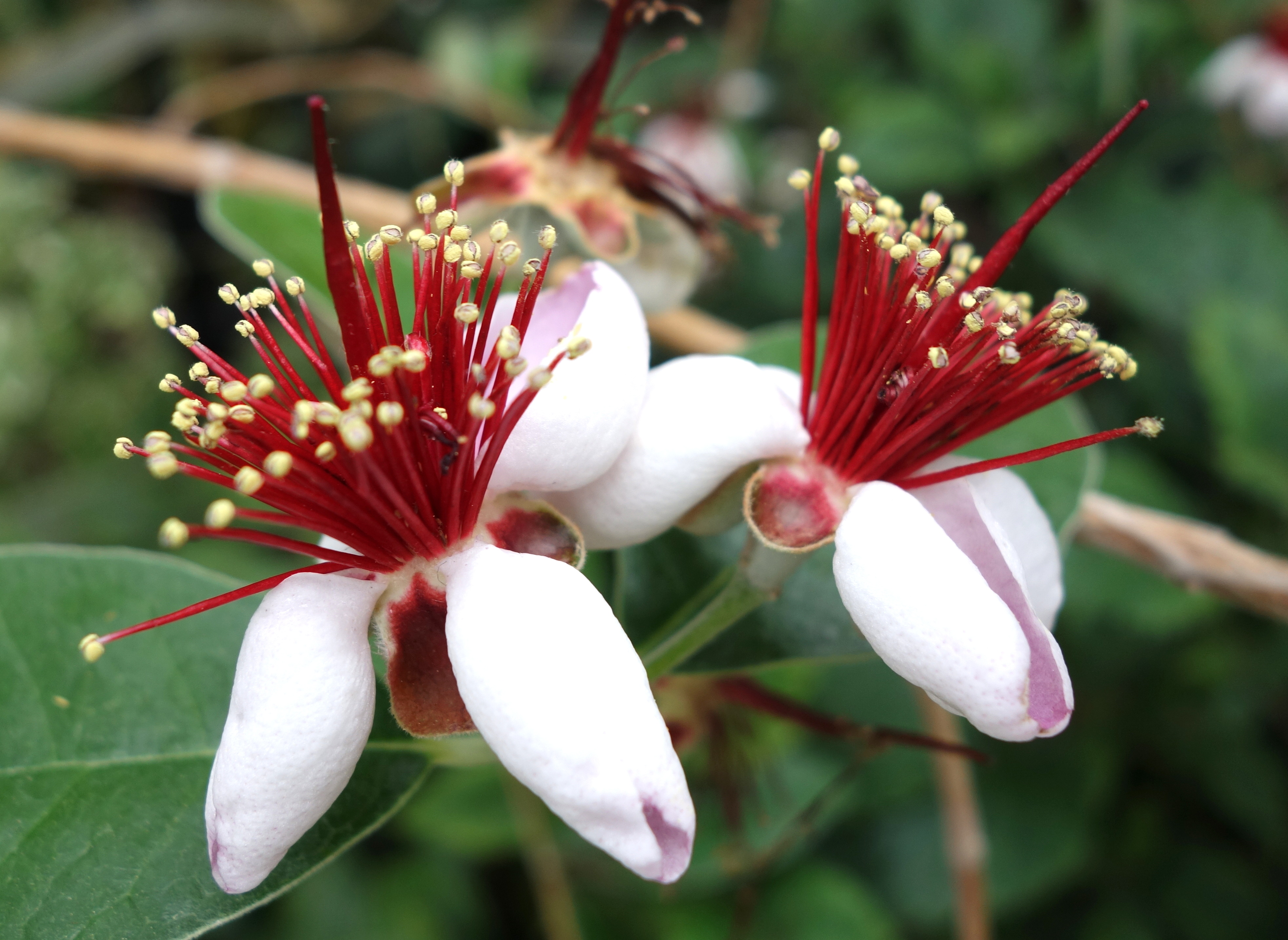
Feijoa

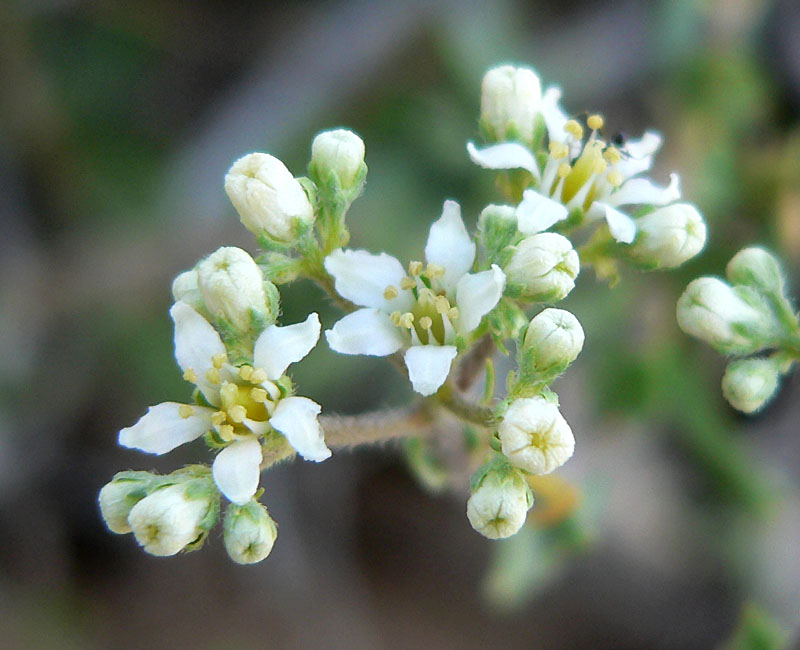
Fendlerella

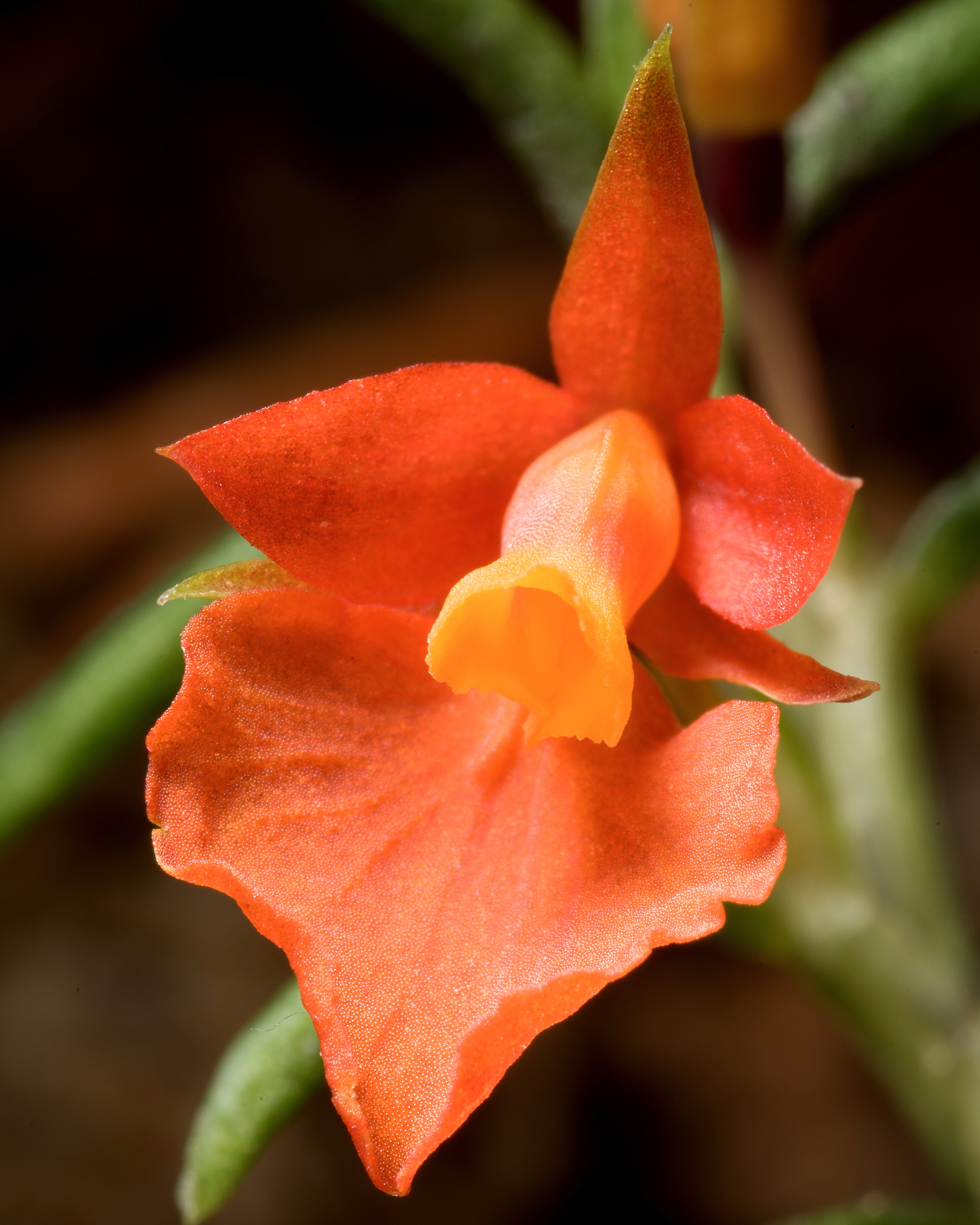
Fernandezia

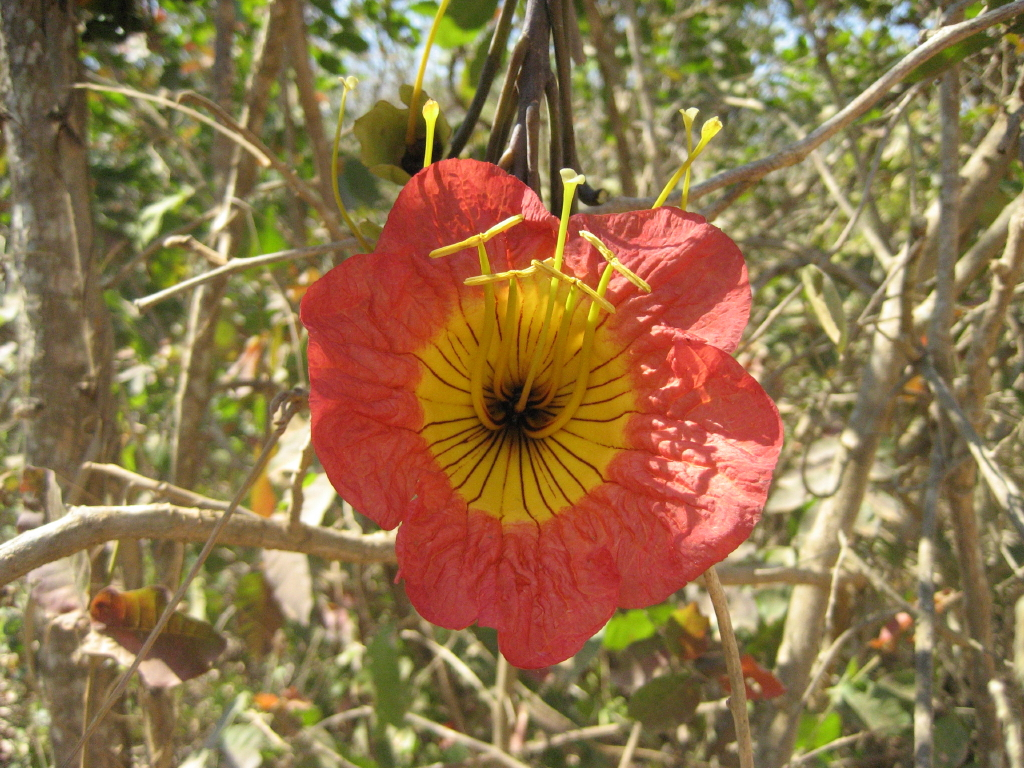
Fernandoa

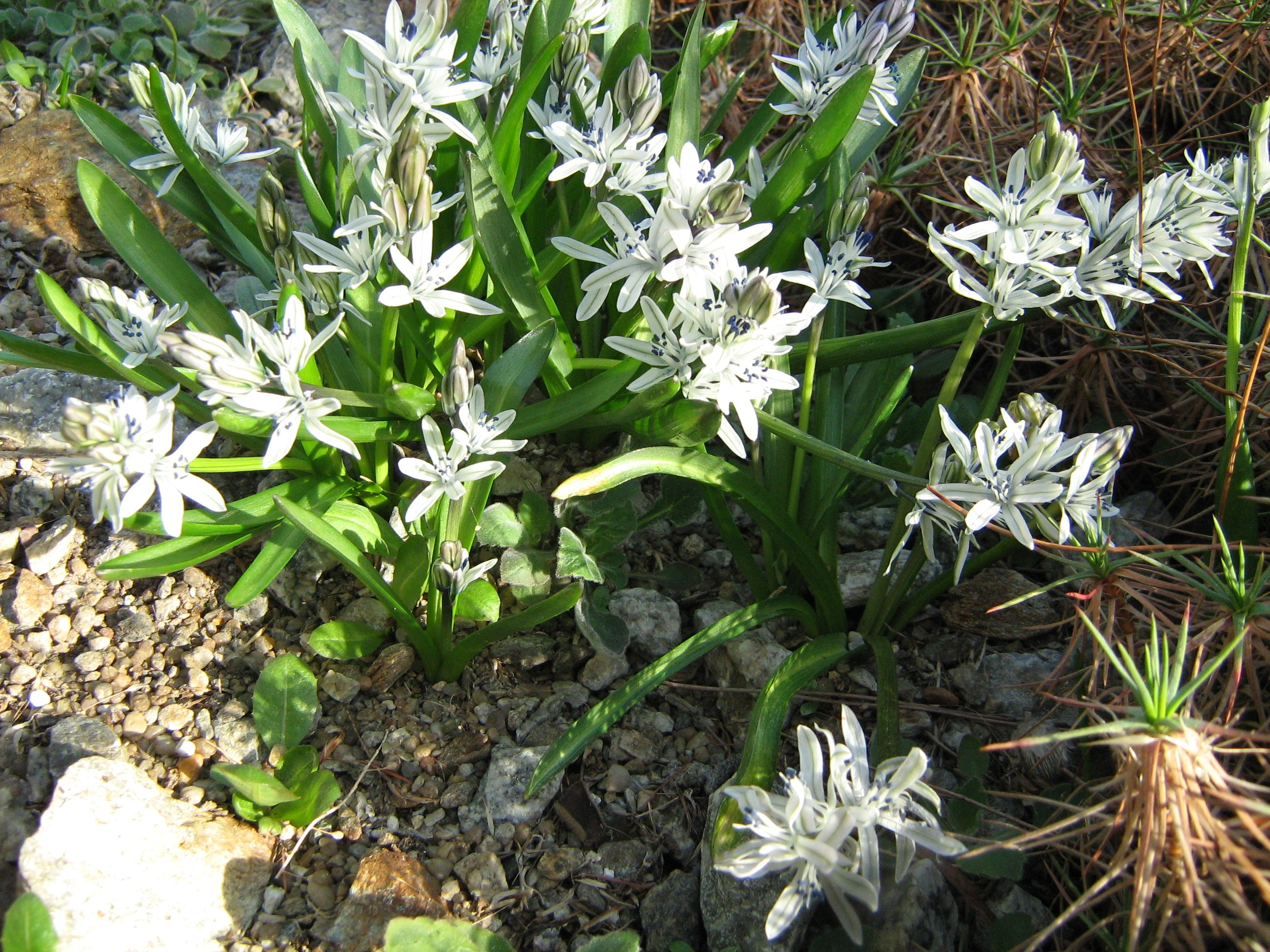
Fessia

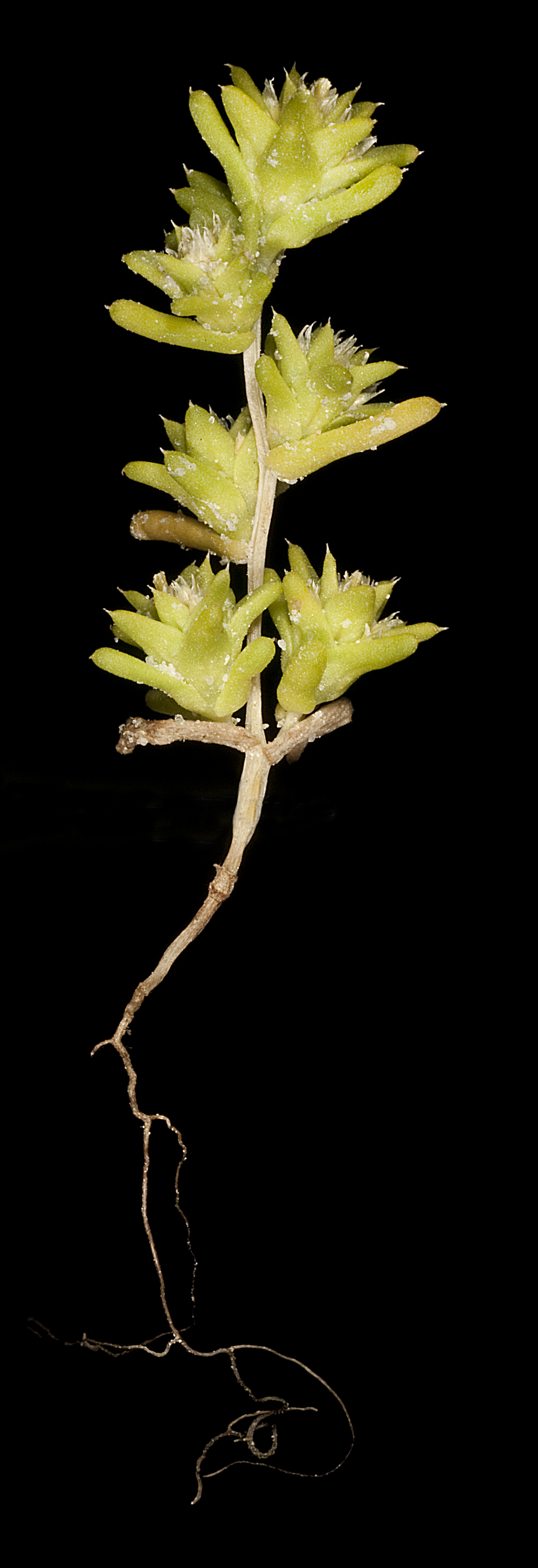
Fitzwillia

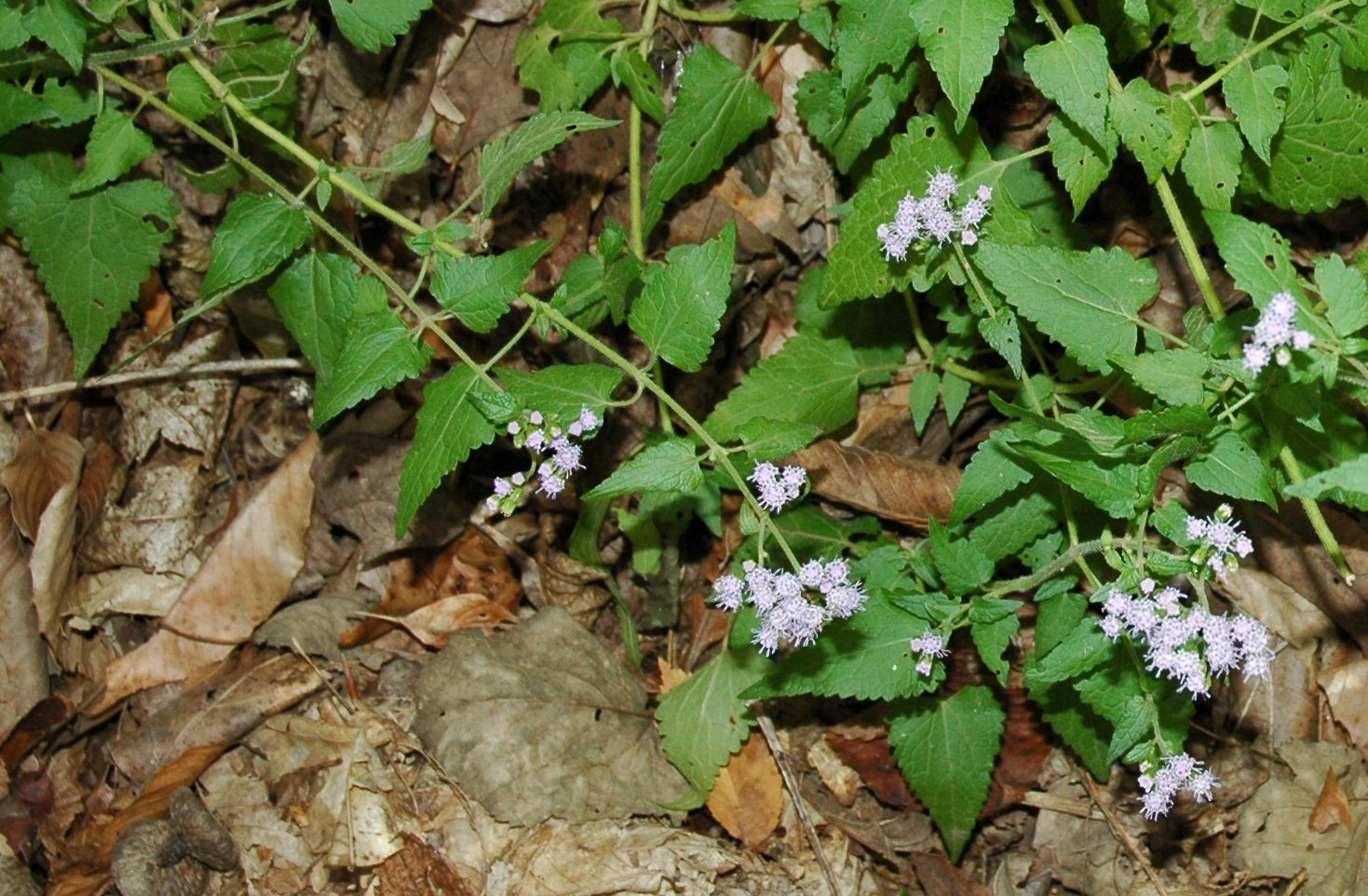
Fleischmannia

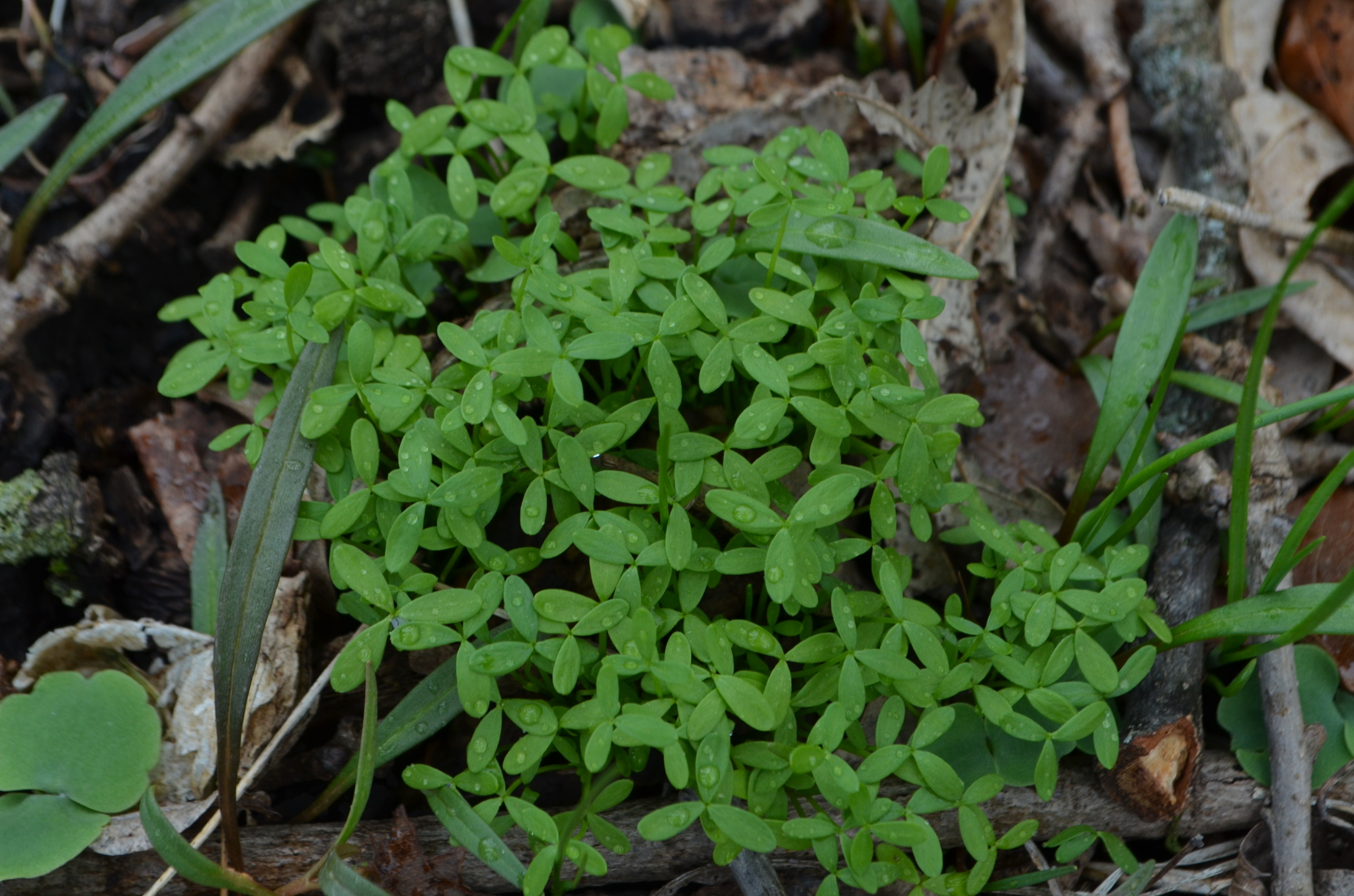
Floerkea

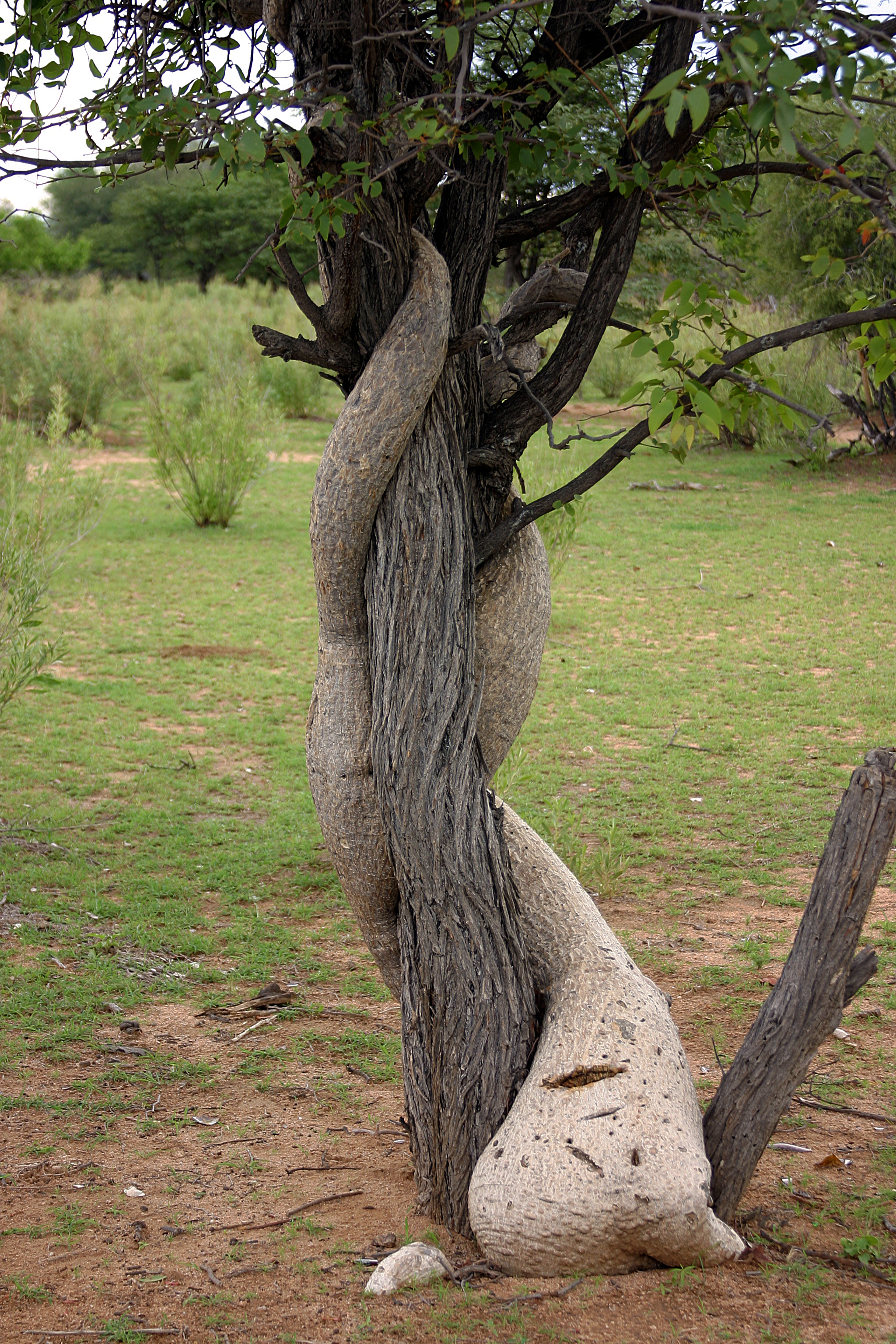
Fockea

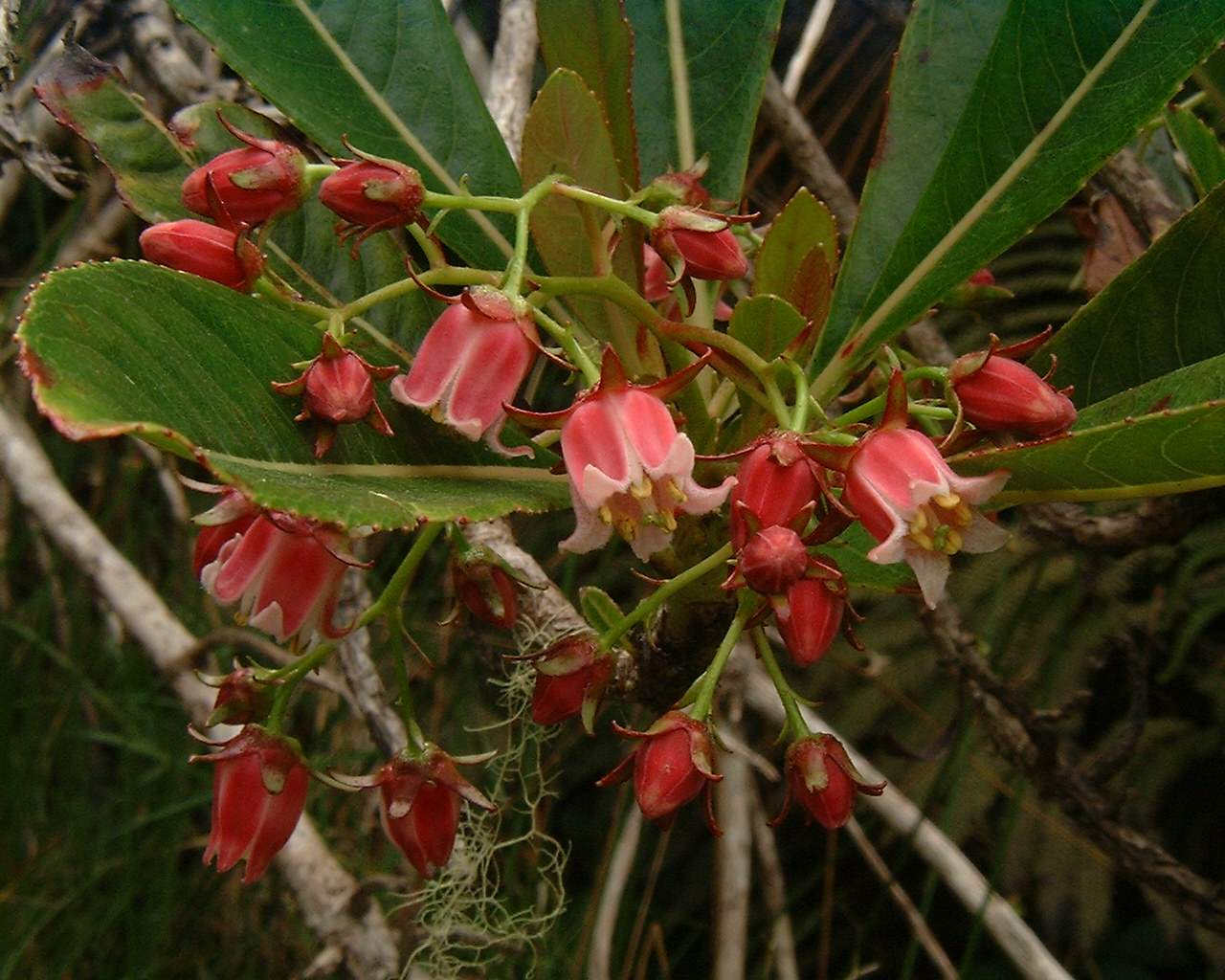
Forgesia

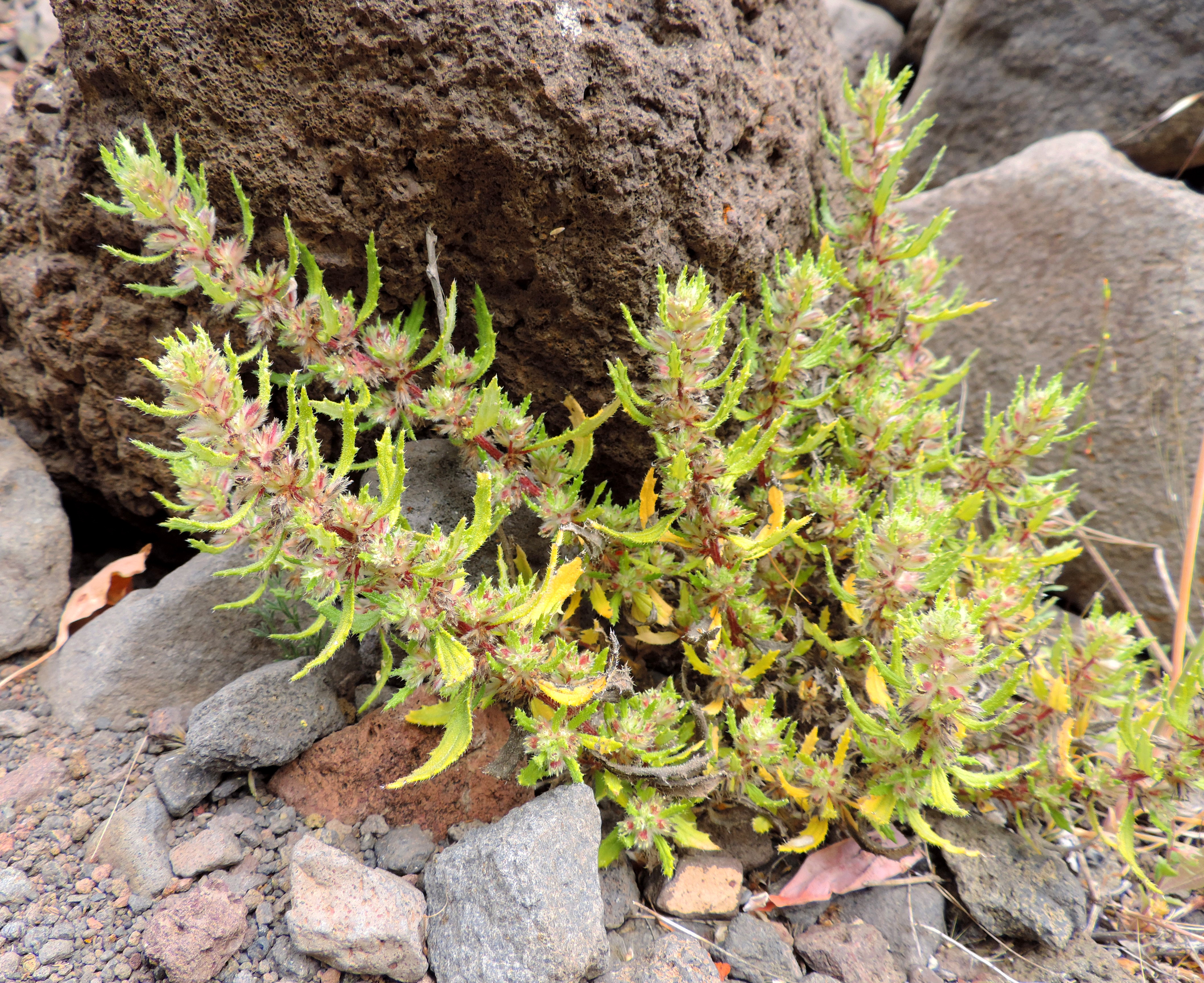
Forsskaolea

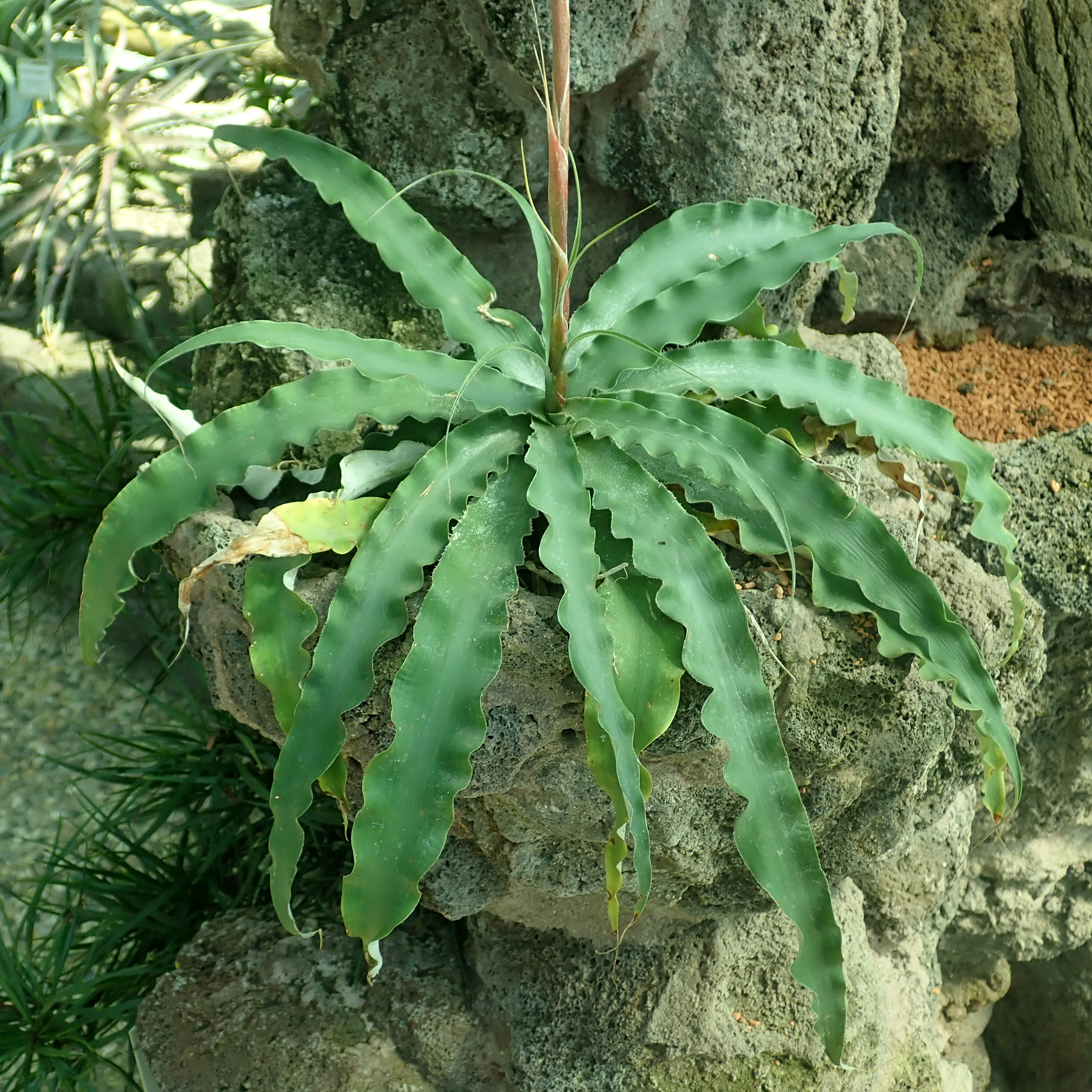
Fosterella

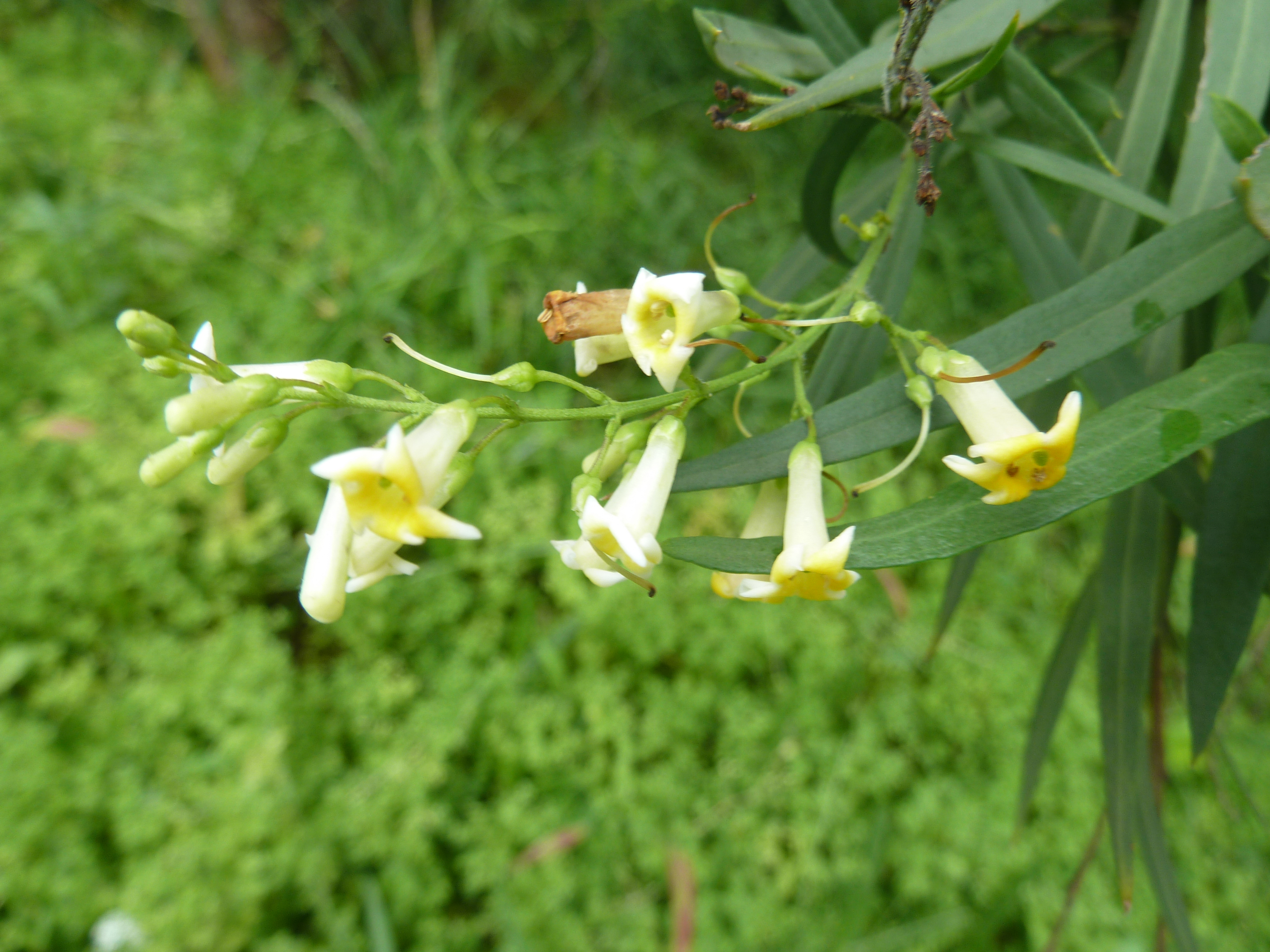
Freylinia

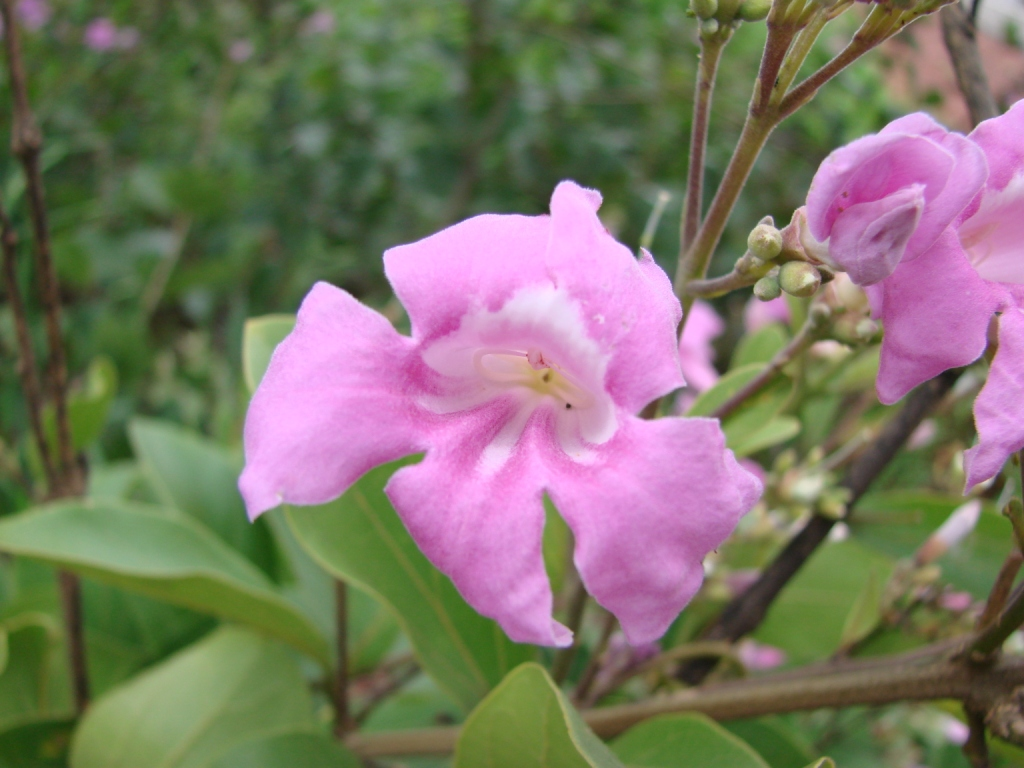
Fridericia

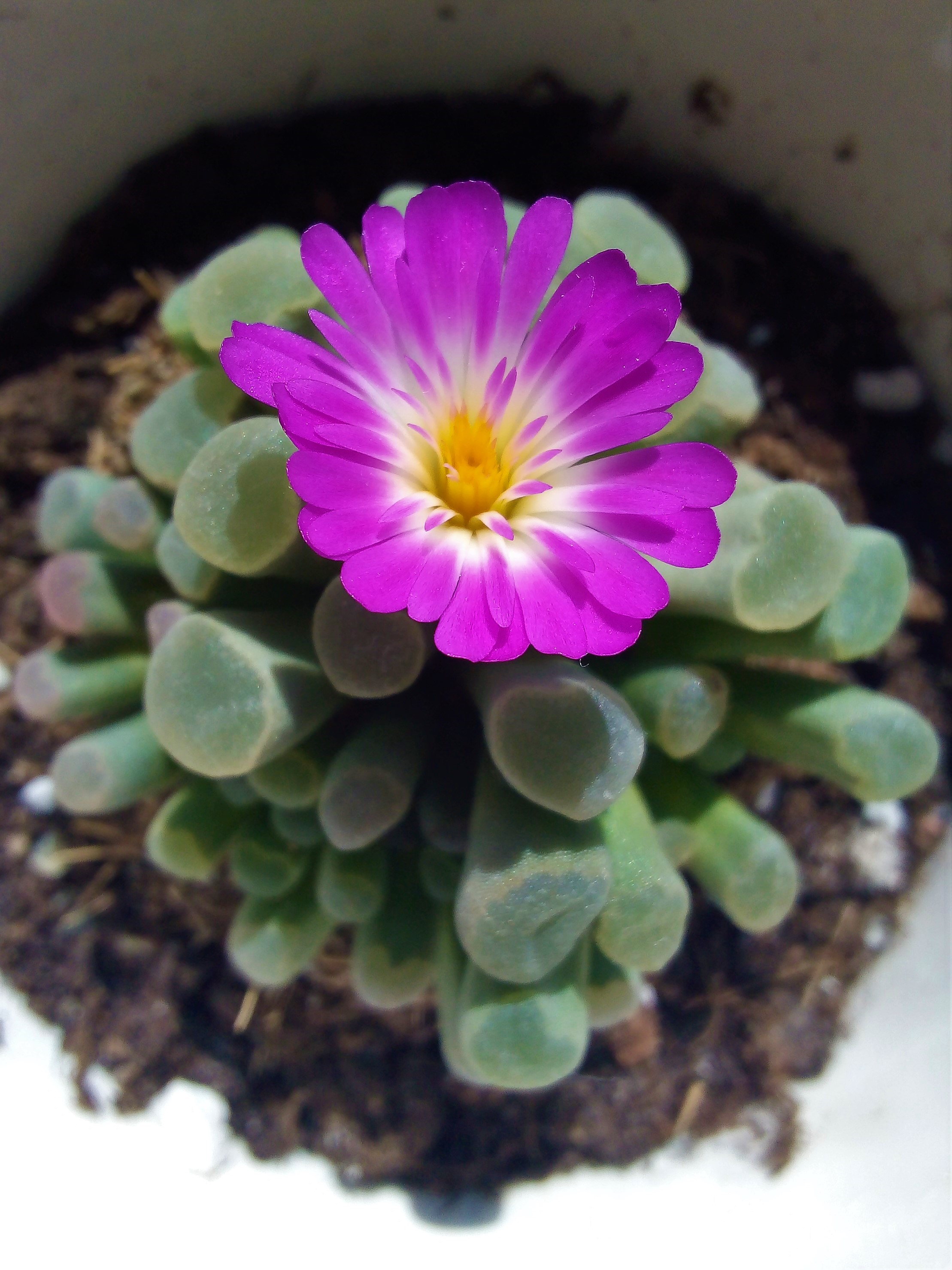
Frithia

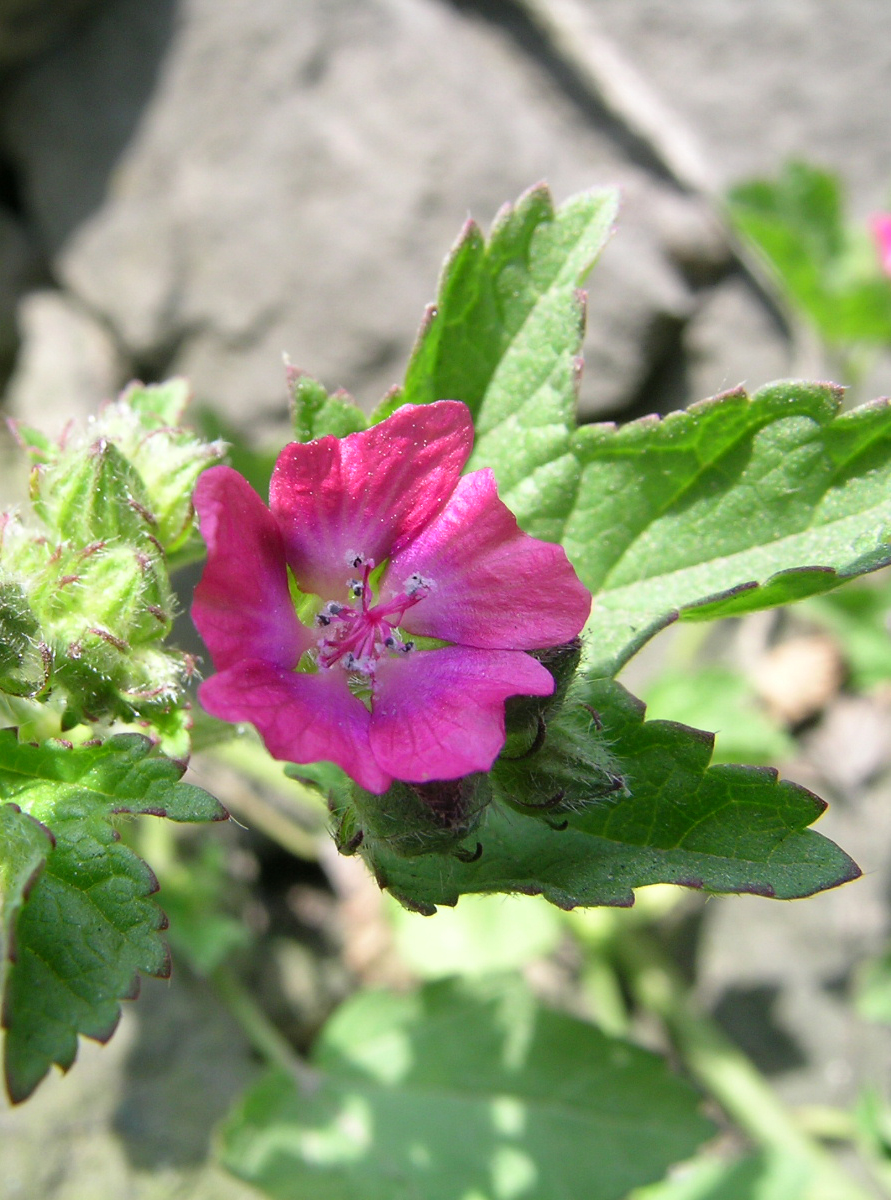
Fuertesimalva

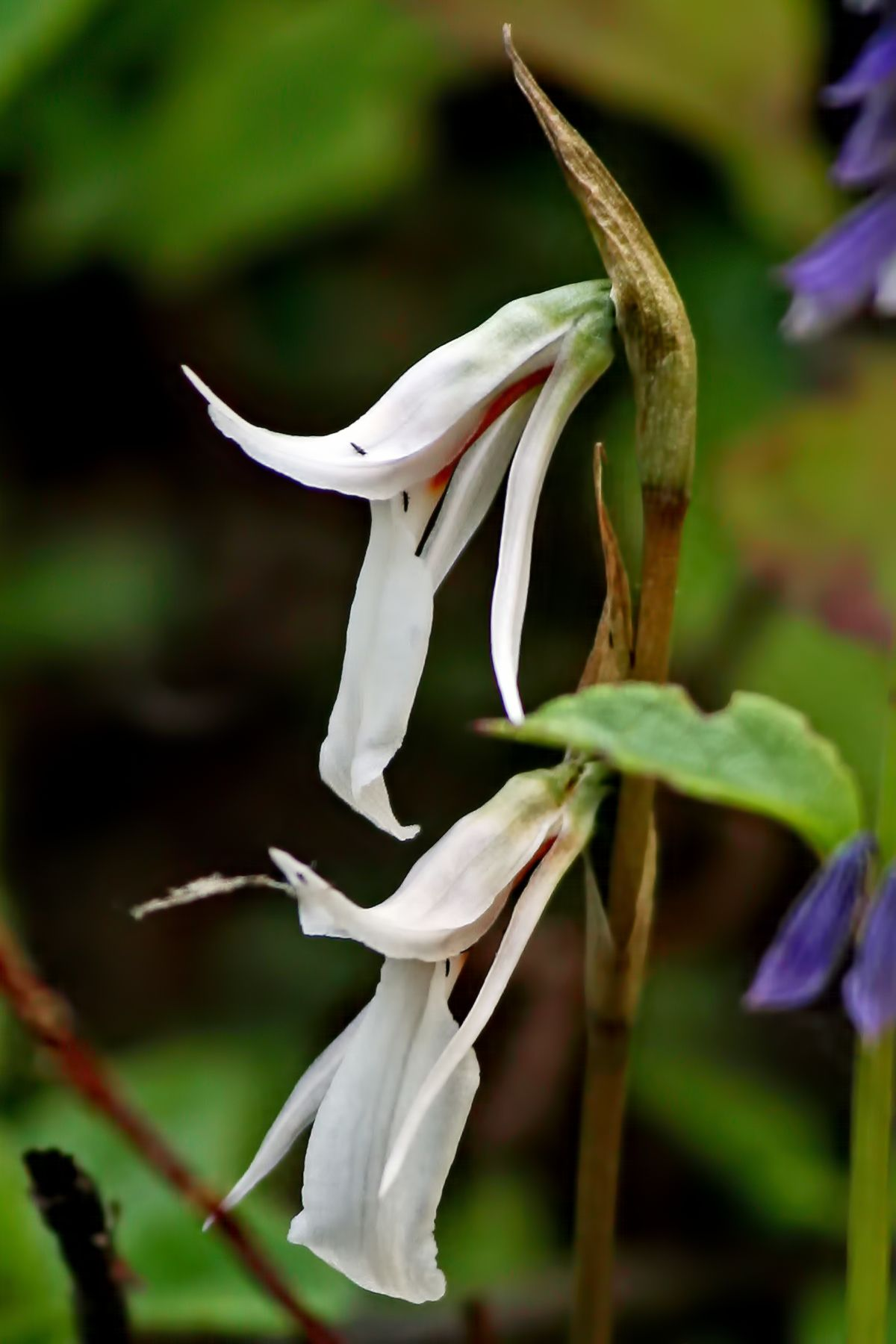
Funkiella

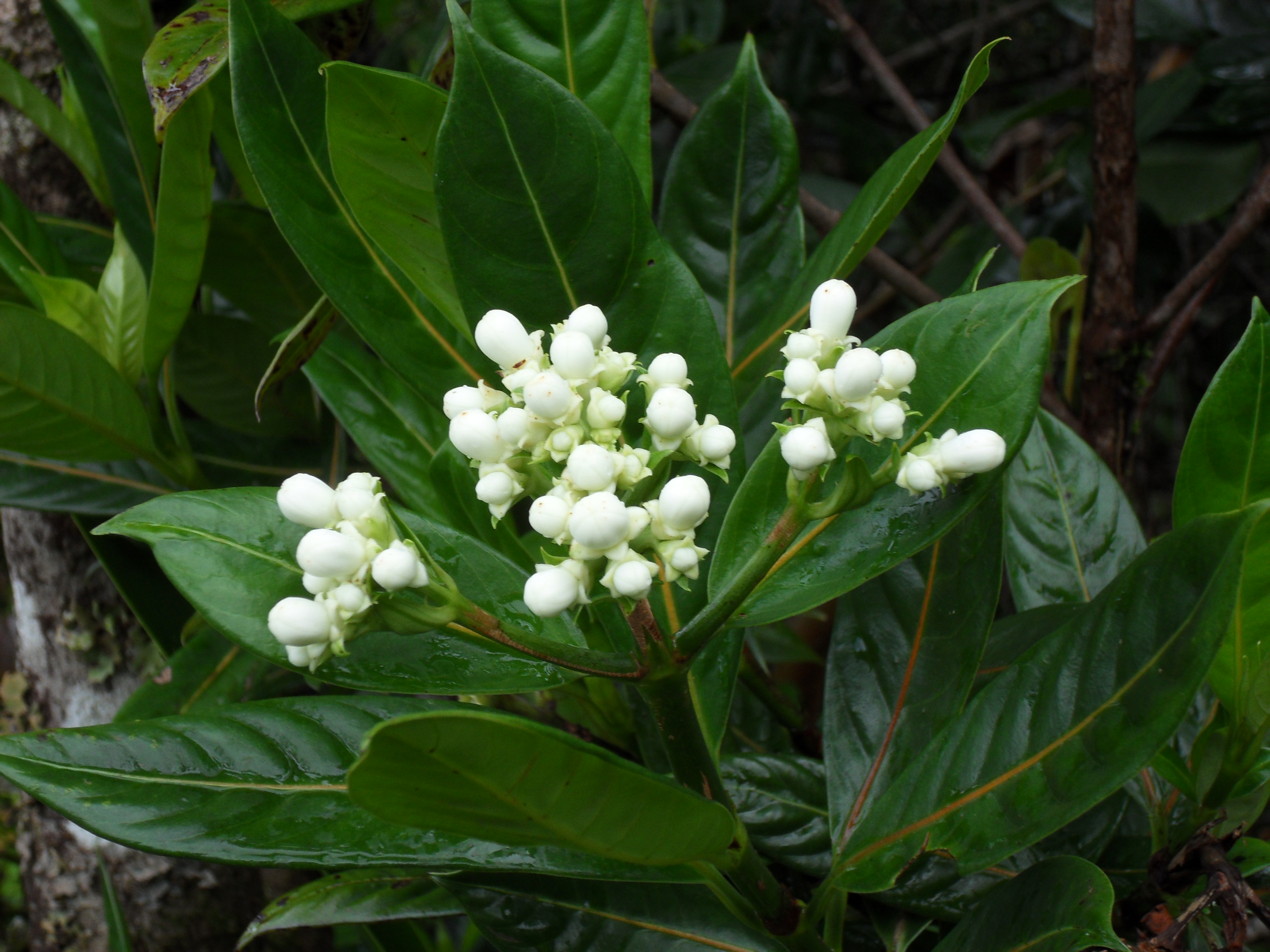
Gaertnera

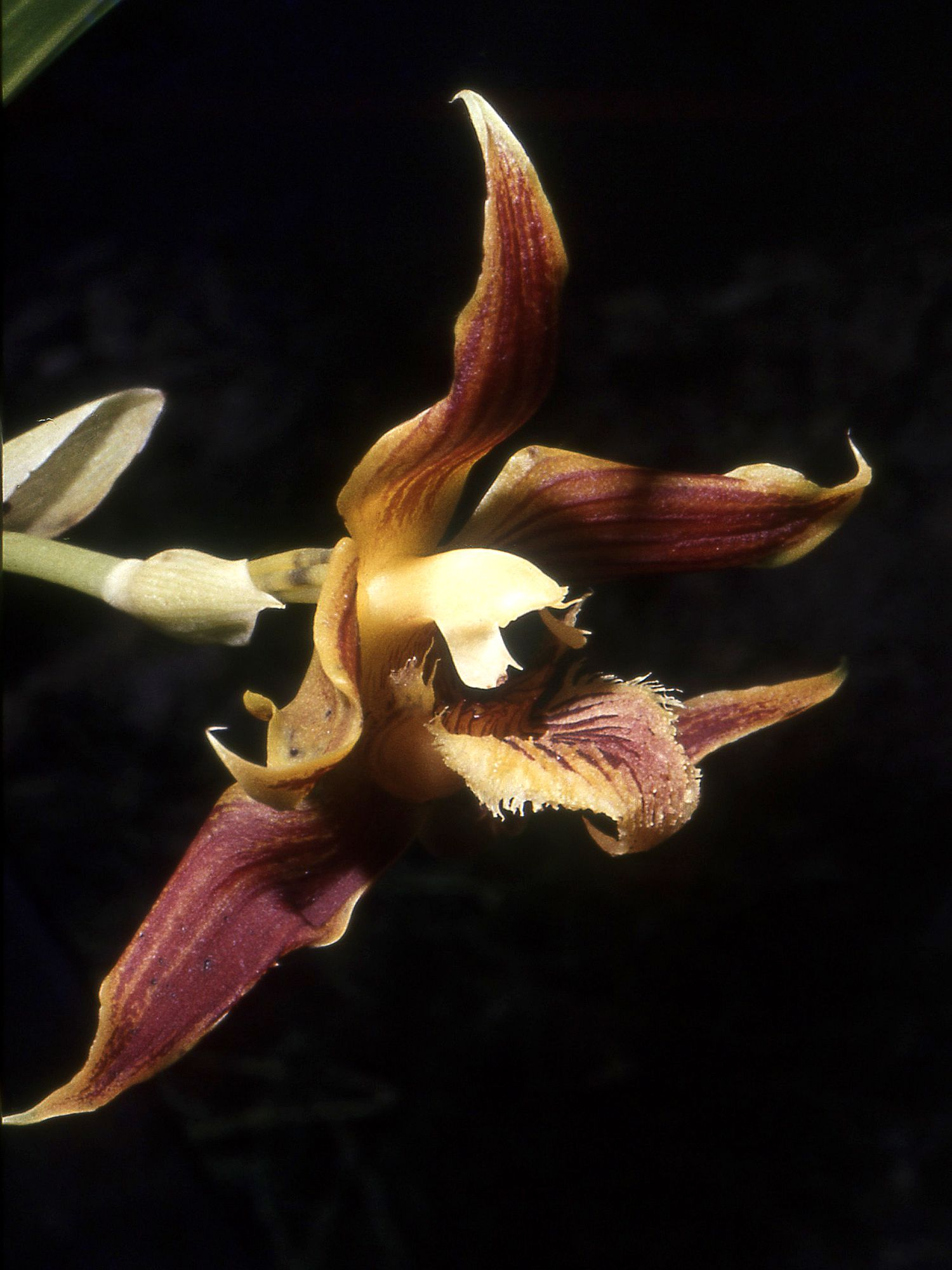
Galeottia

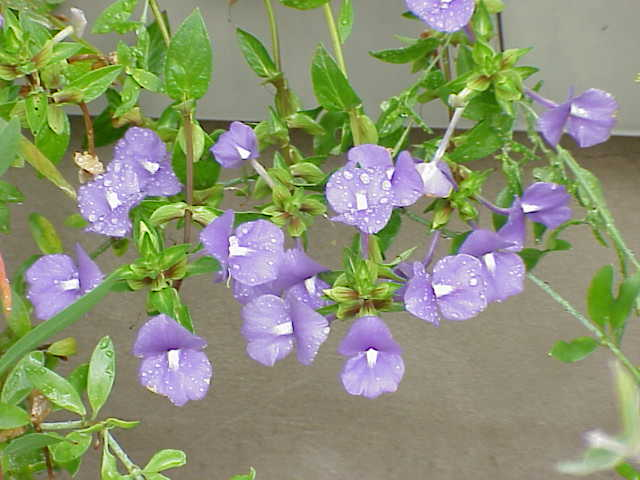
Galvezia

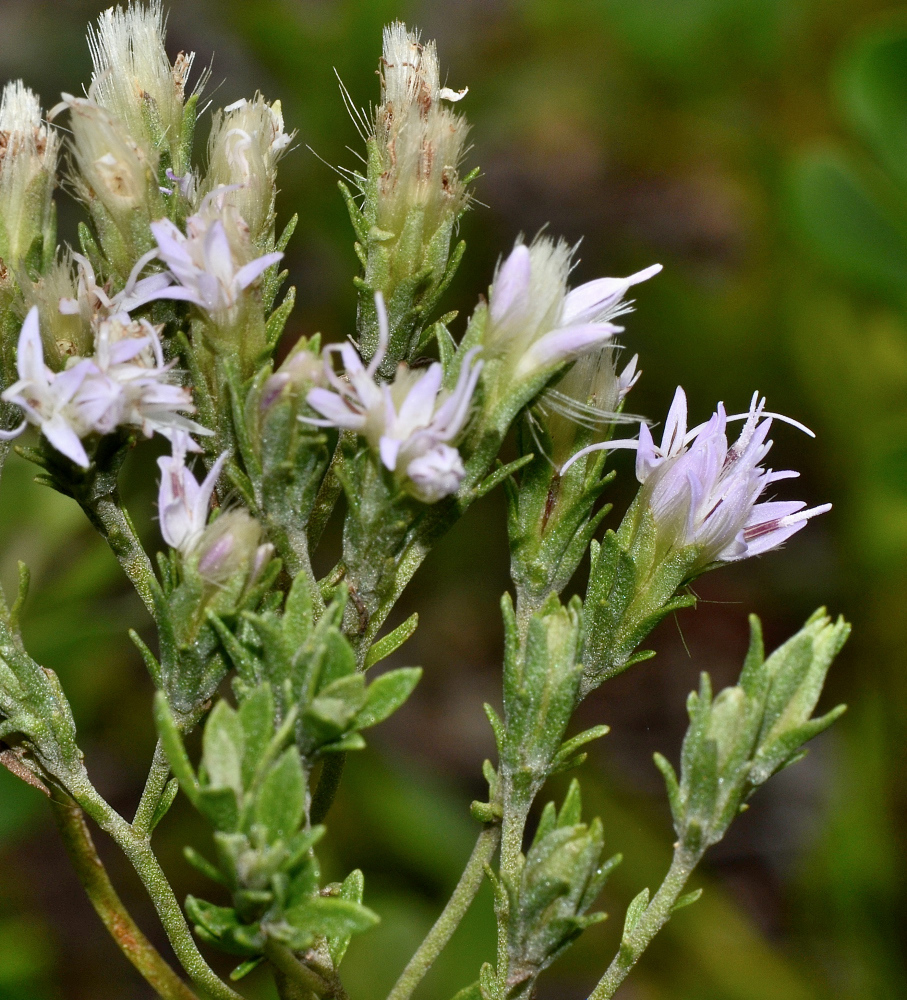
Garberia

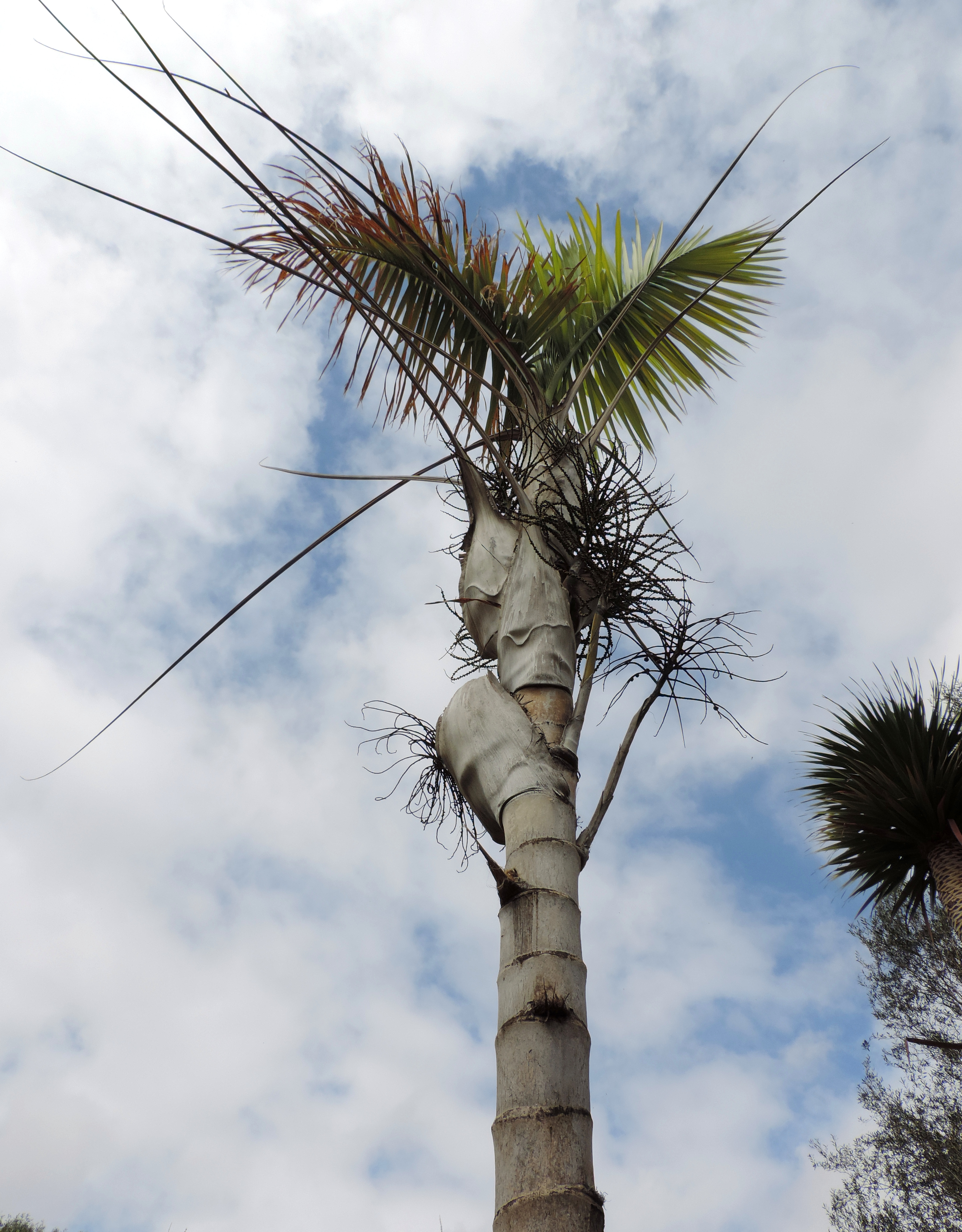
Gaussia

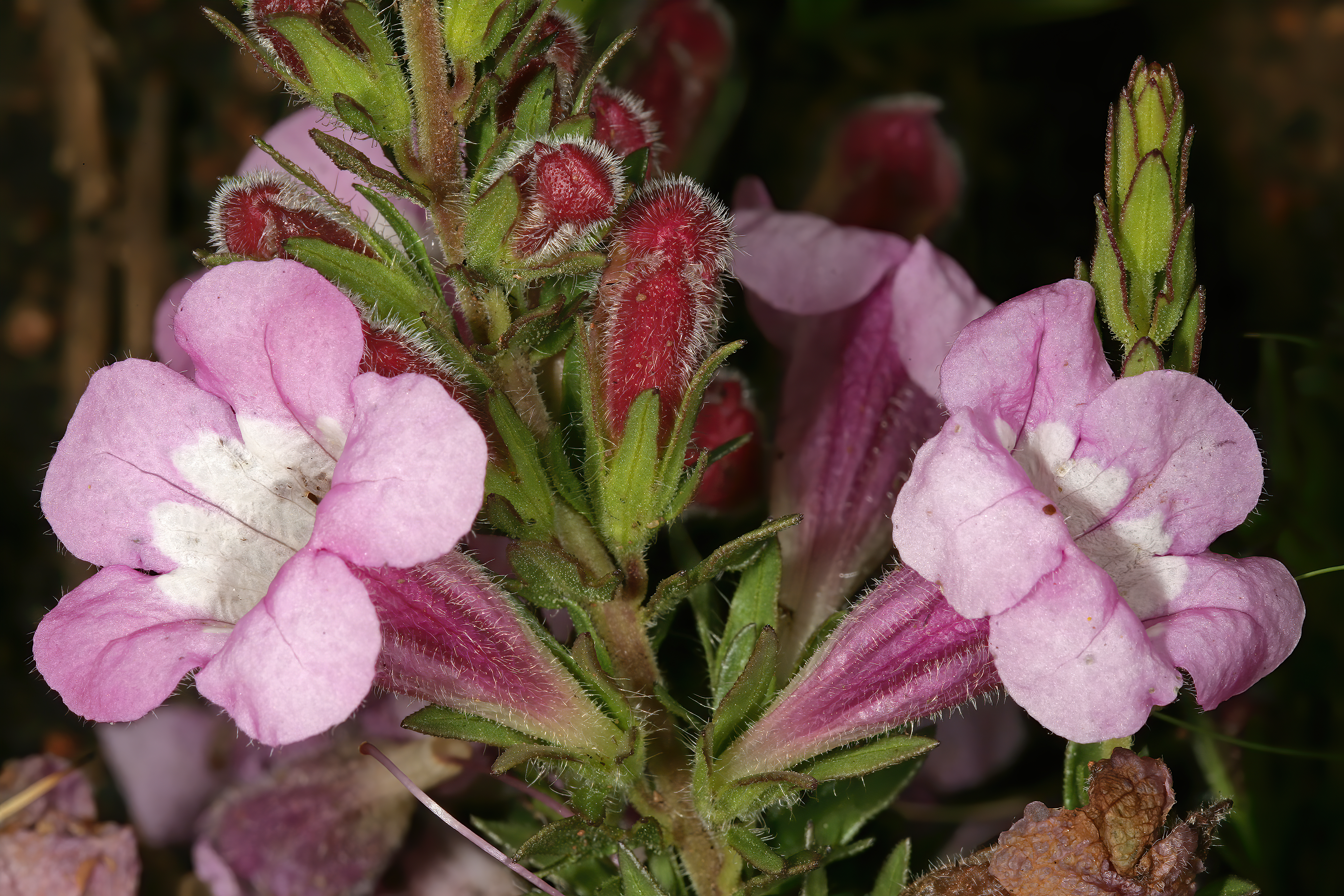
Graderia

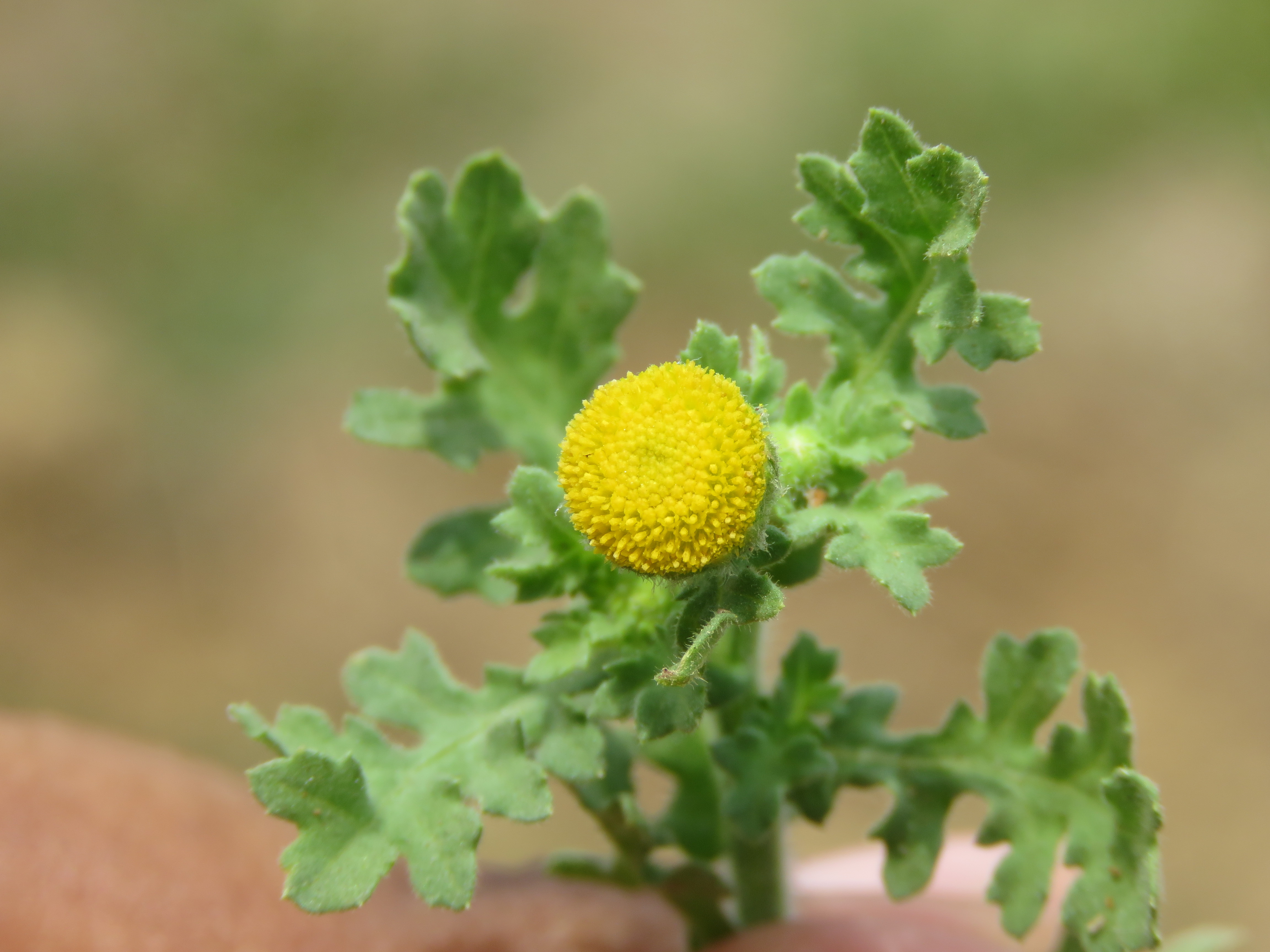
Grangea

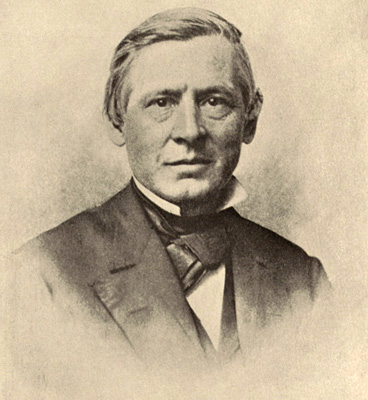
Asa Gray

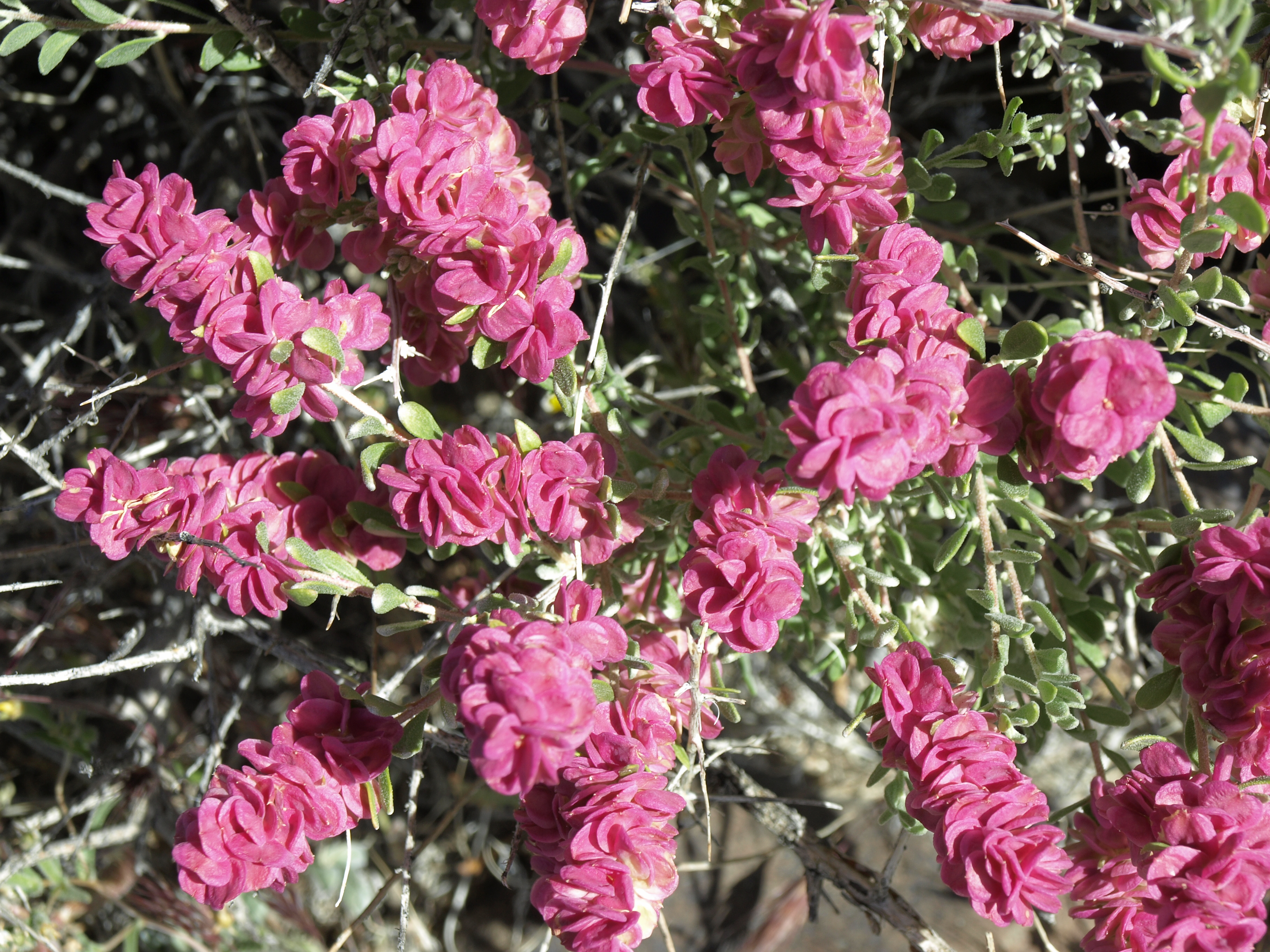
Grayia

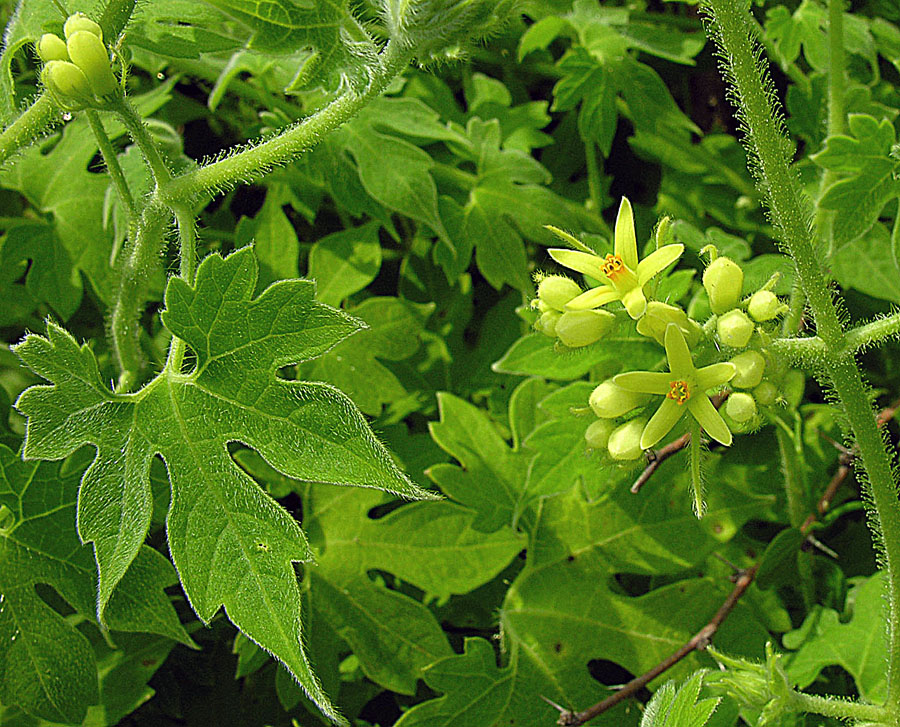
Gronovia

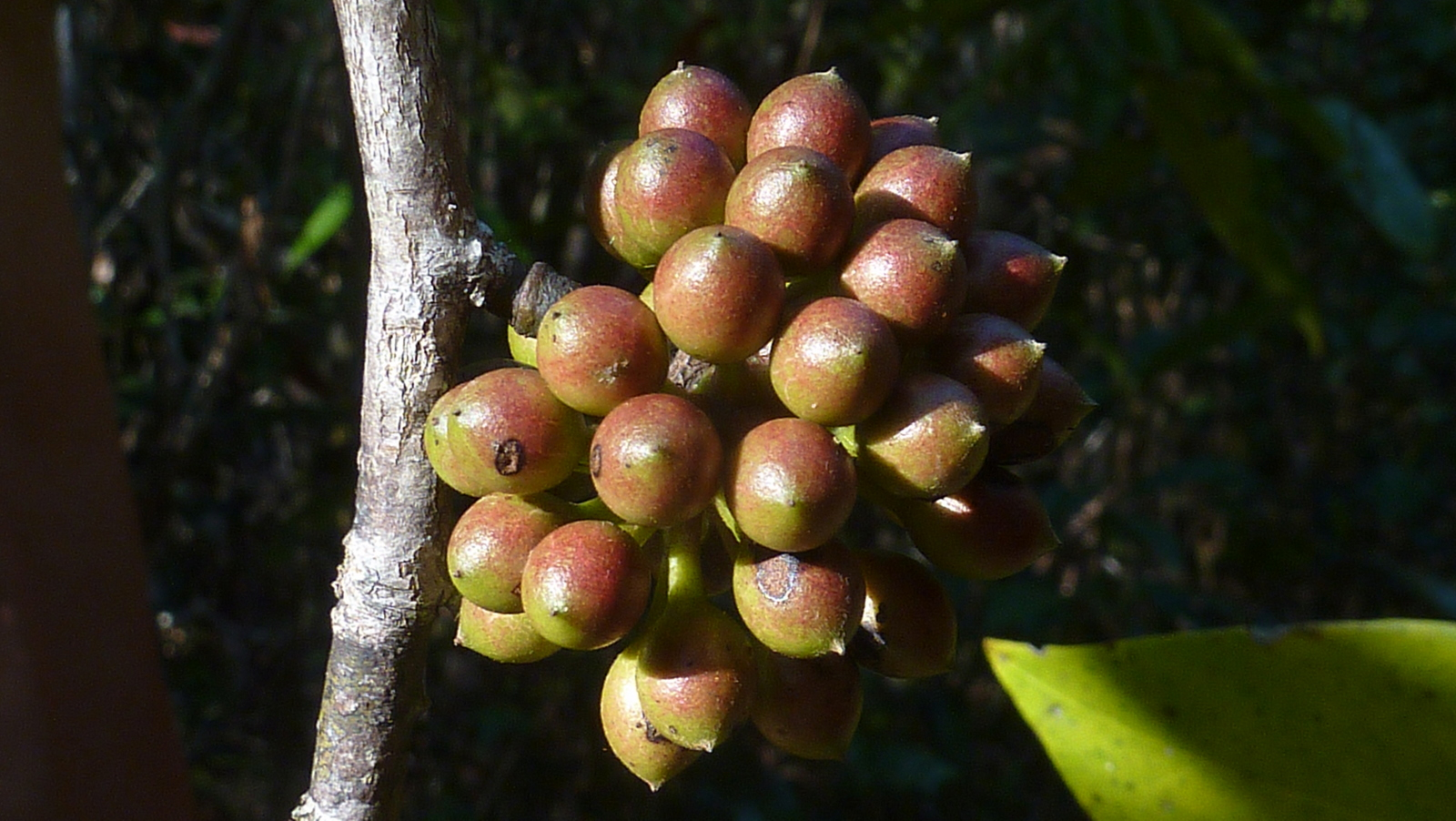
Guatteria

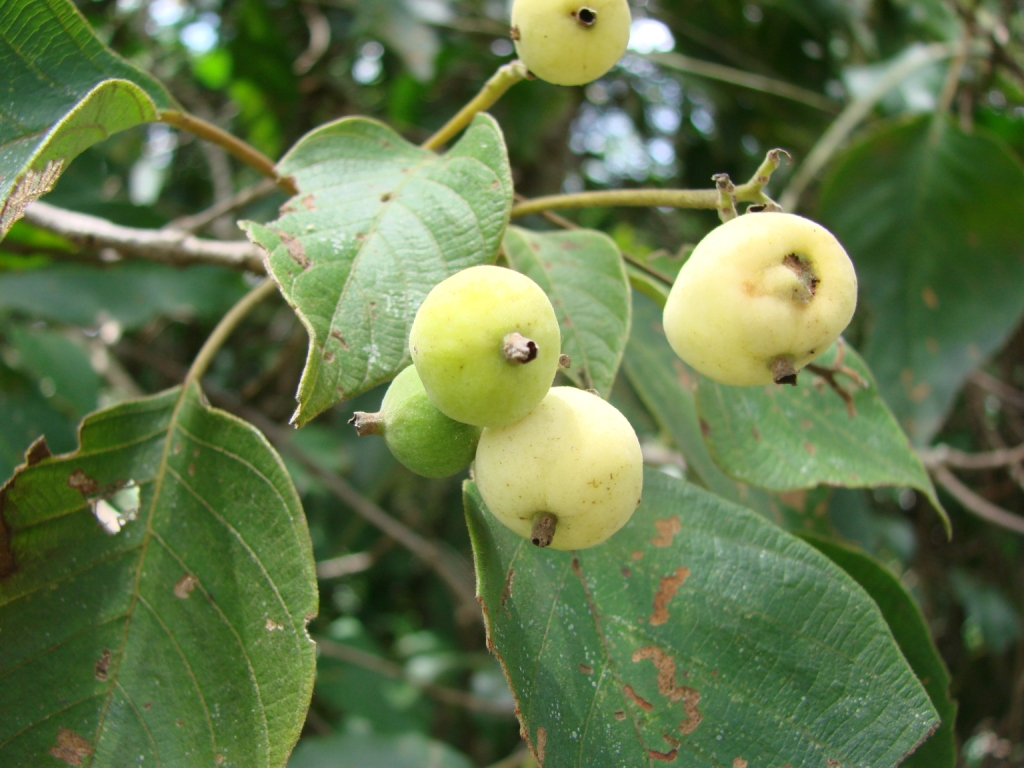
Guettarda

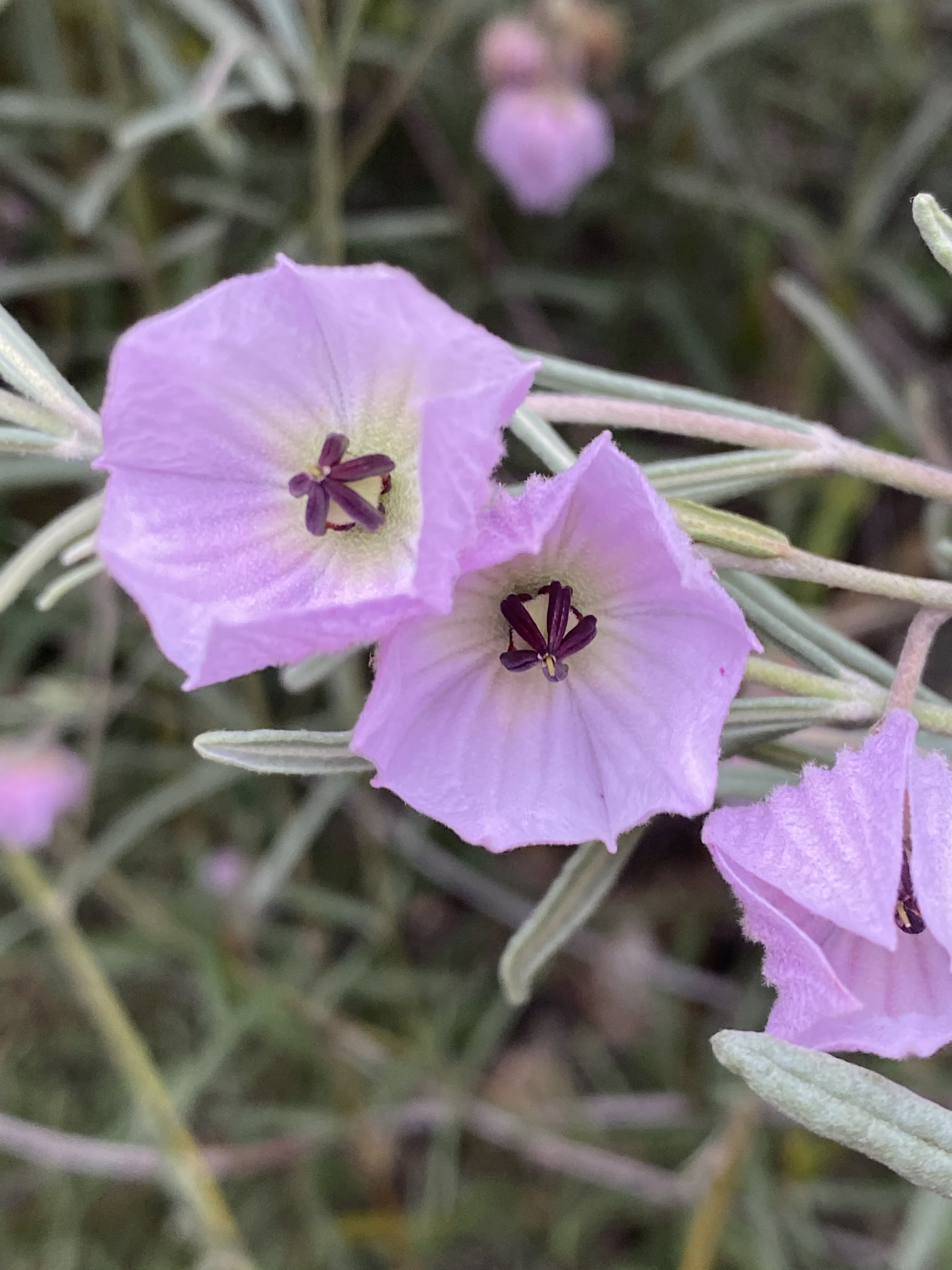
Guichenotia

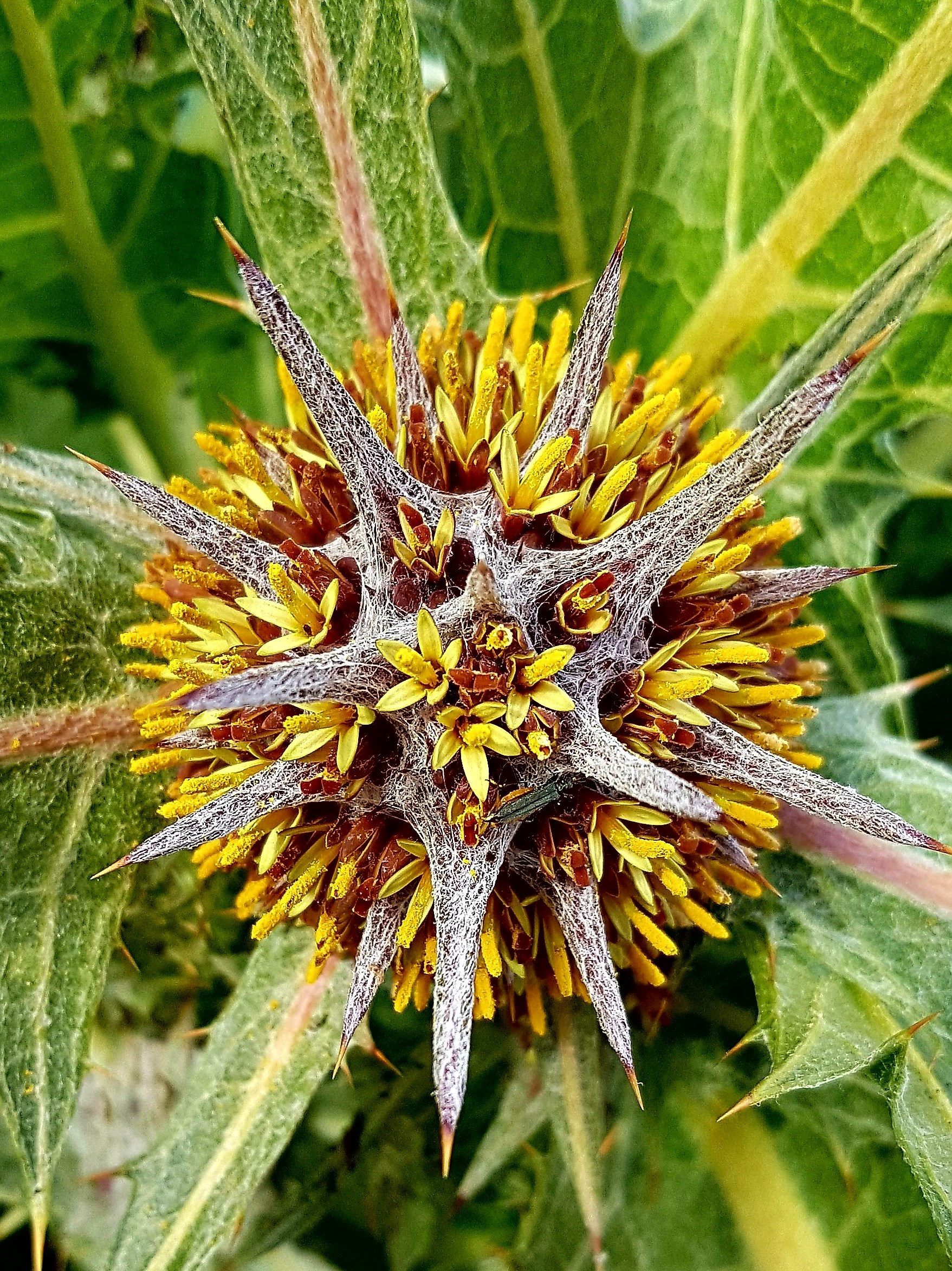
Gundelia

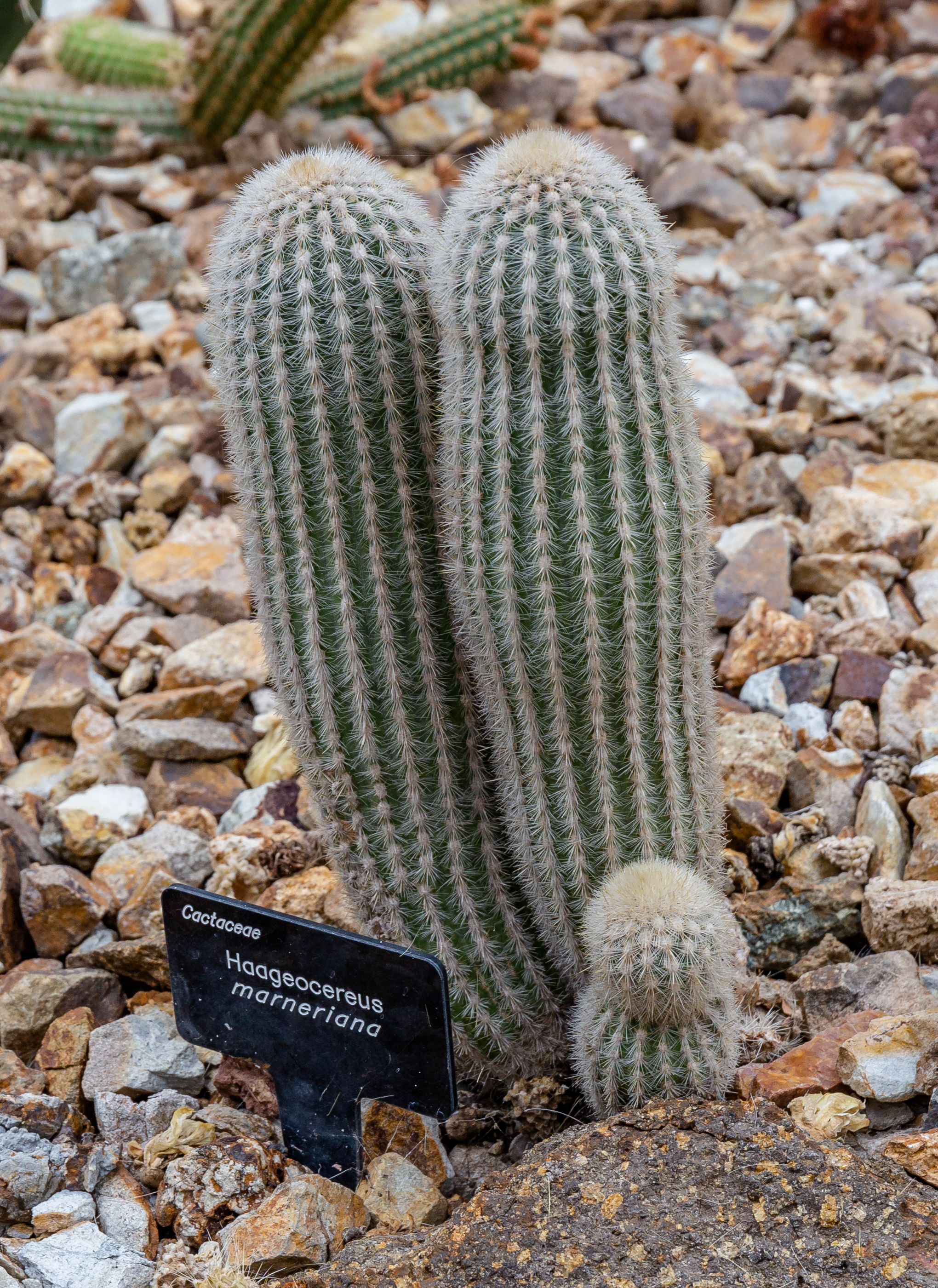
Haageocereus

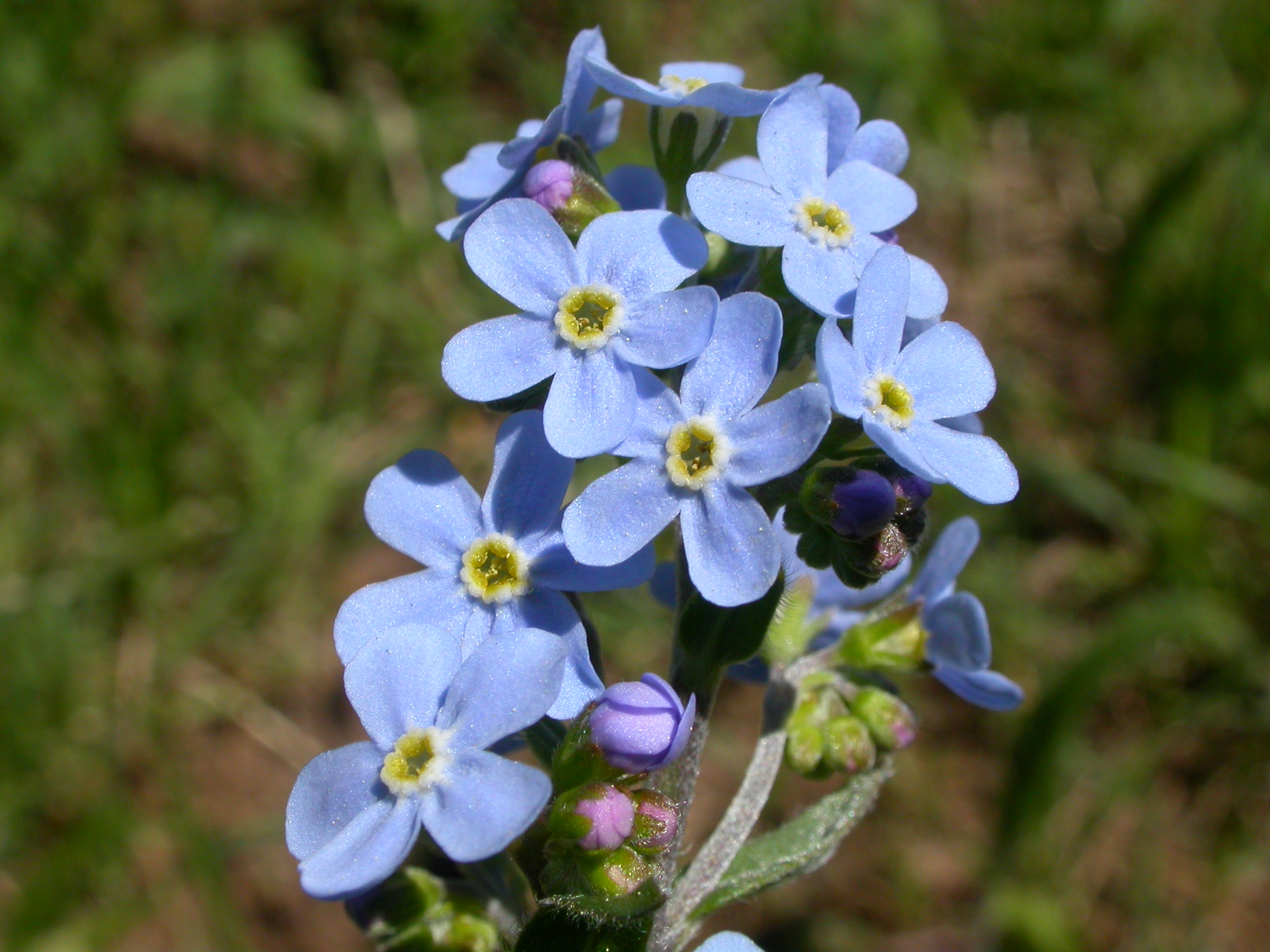
Hackelia

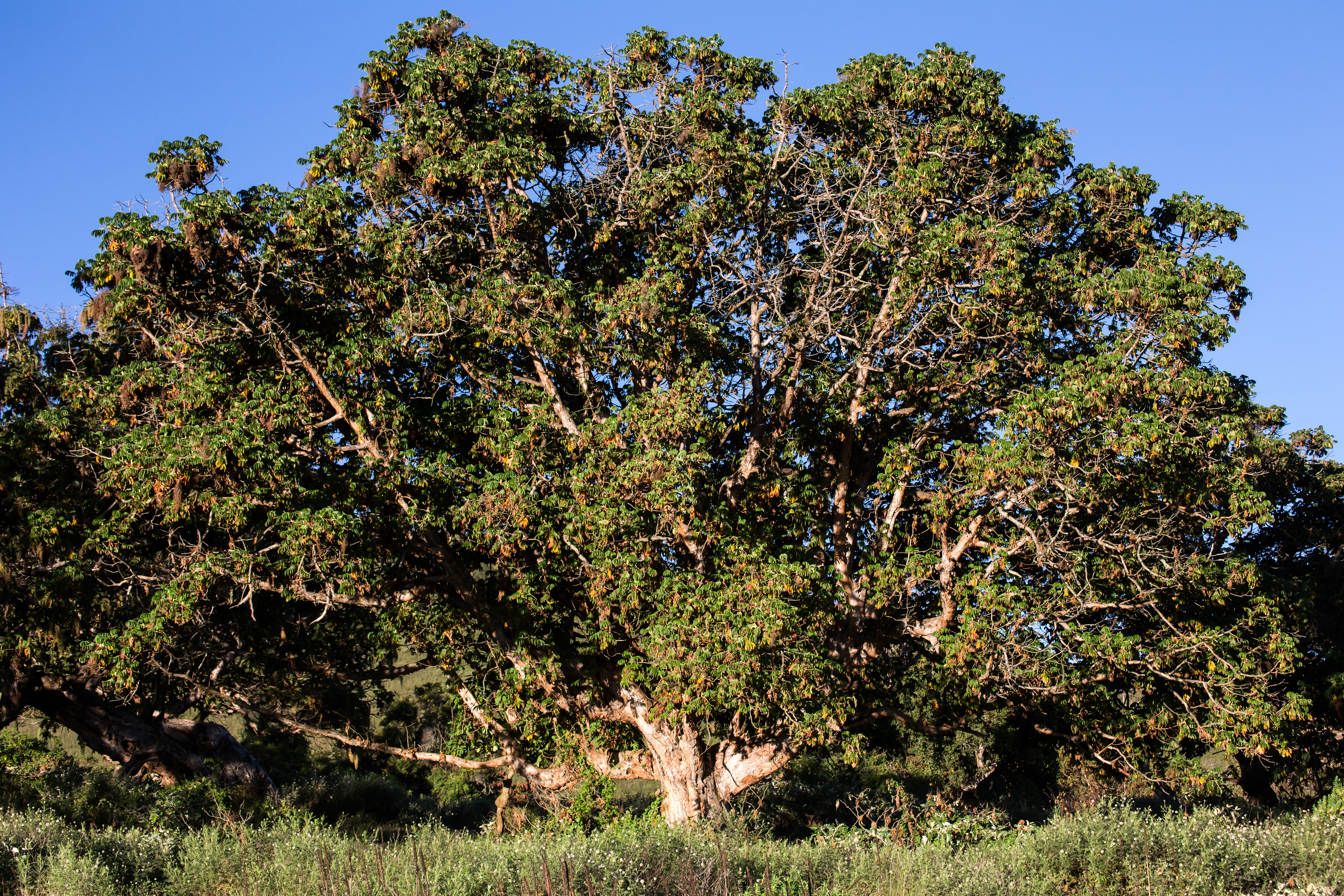
Hagenia

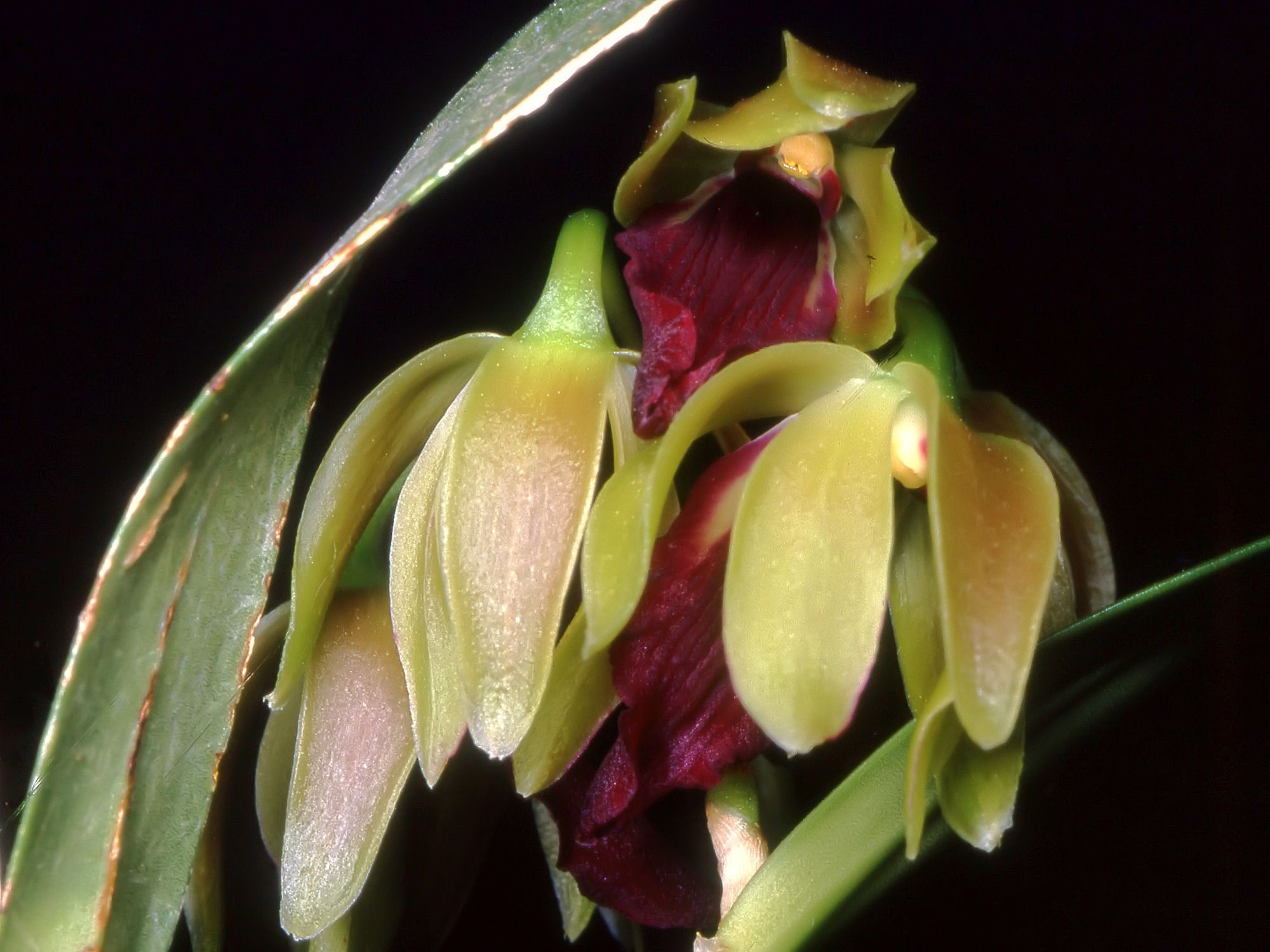
Hagsatera

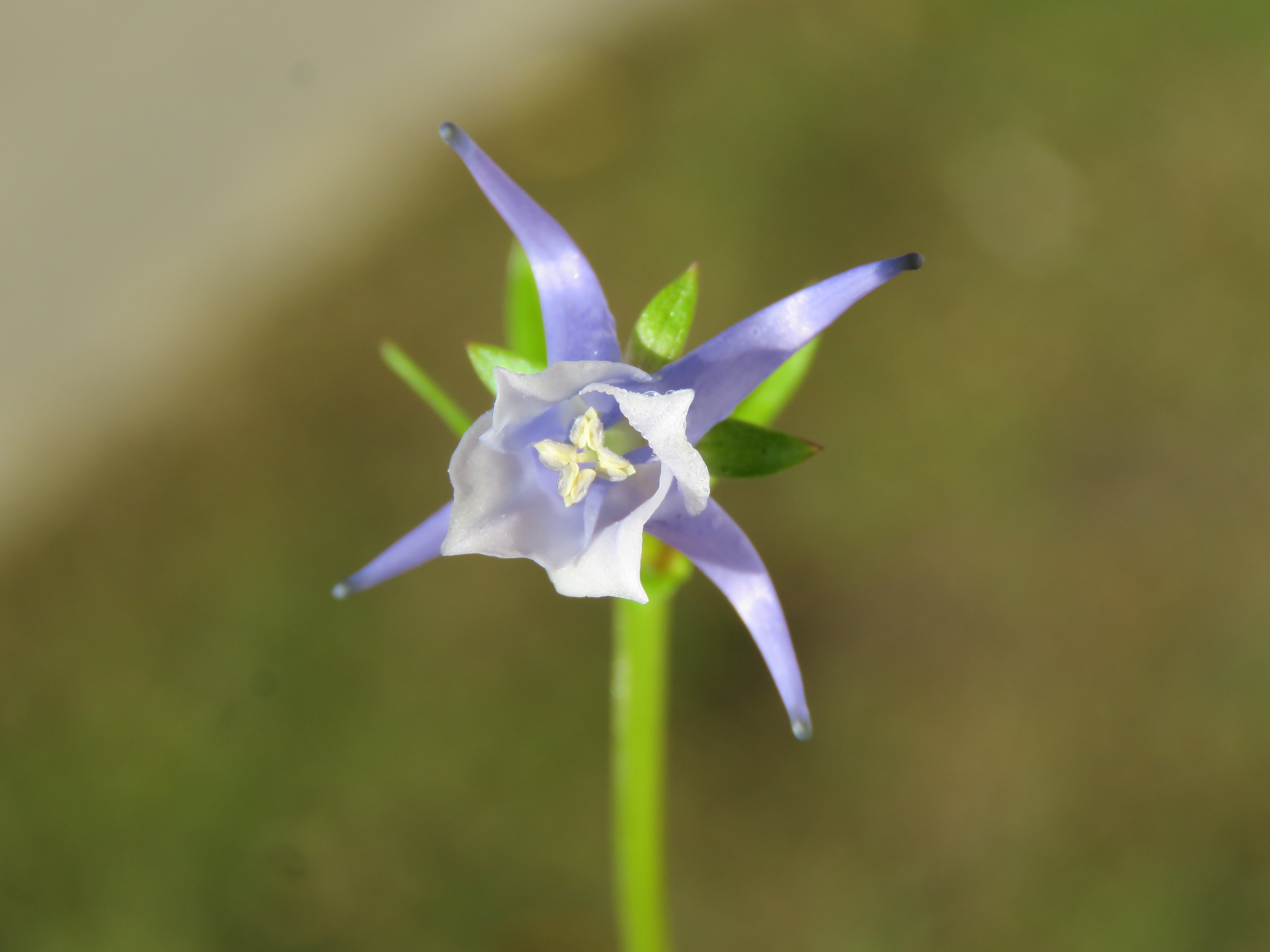
Halenia

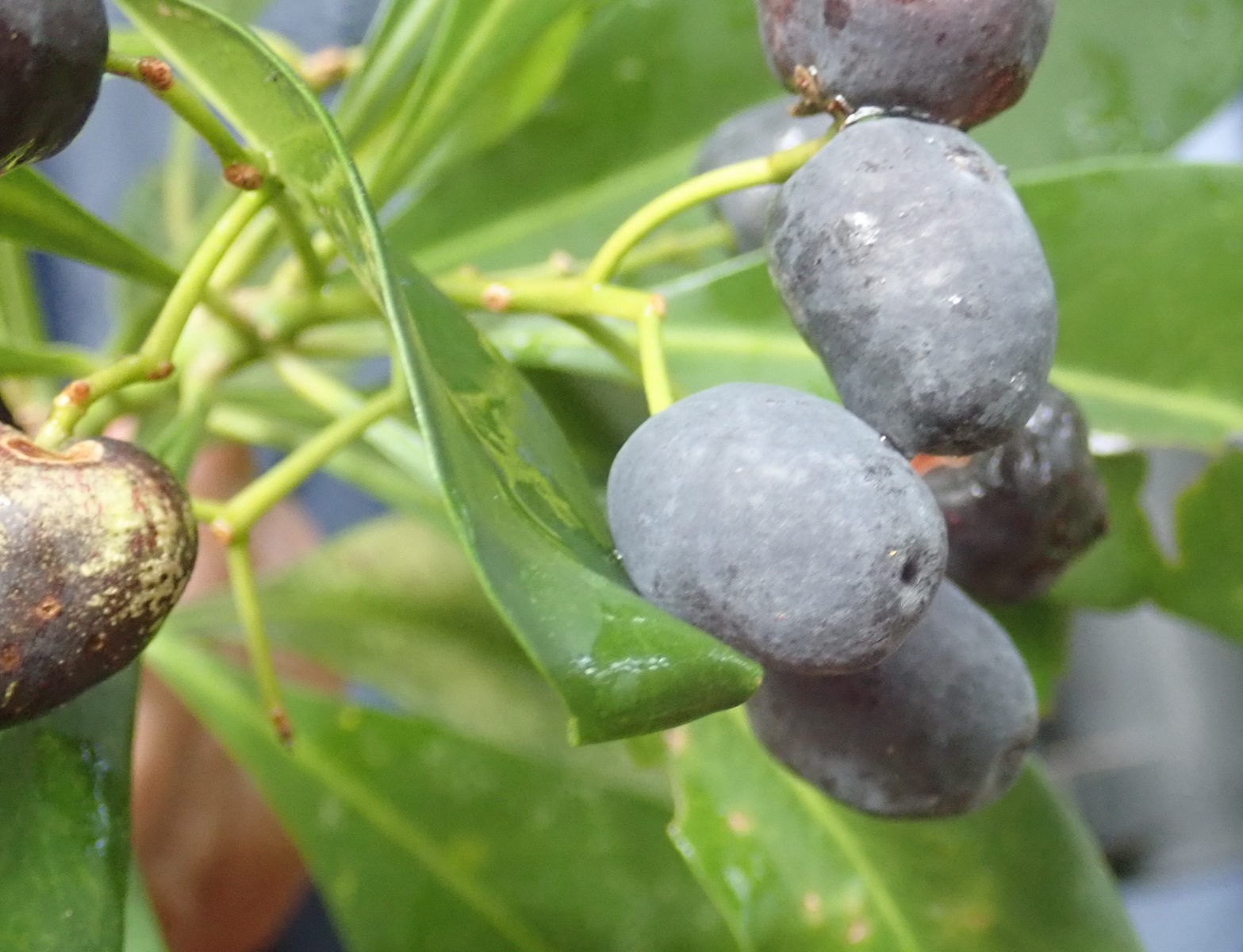
Halfordia

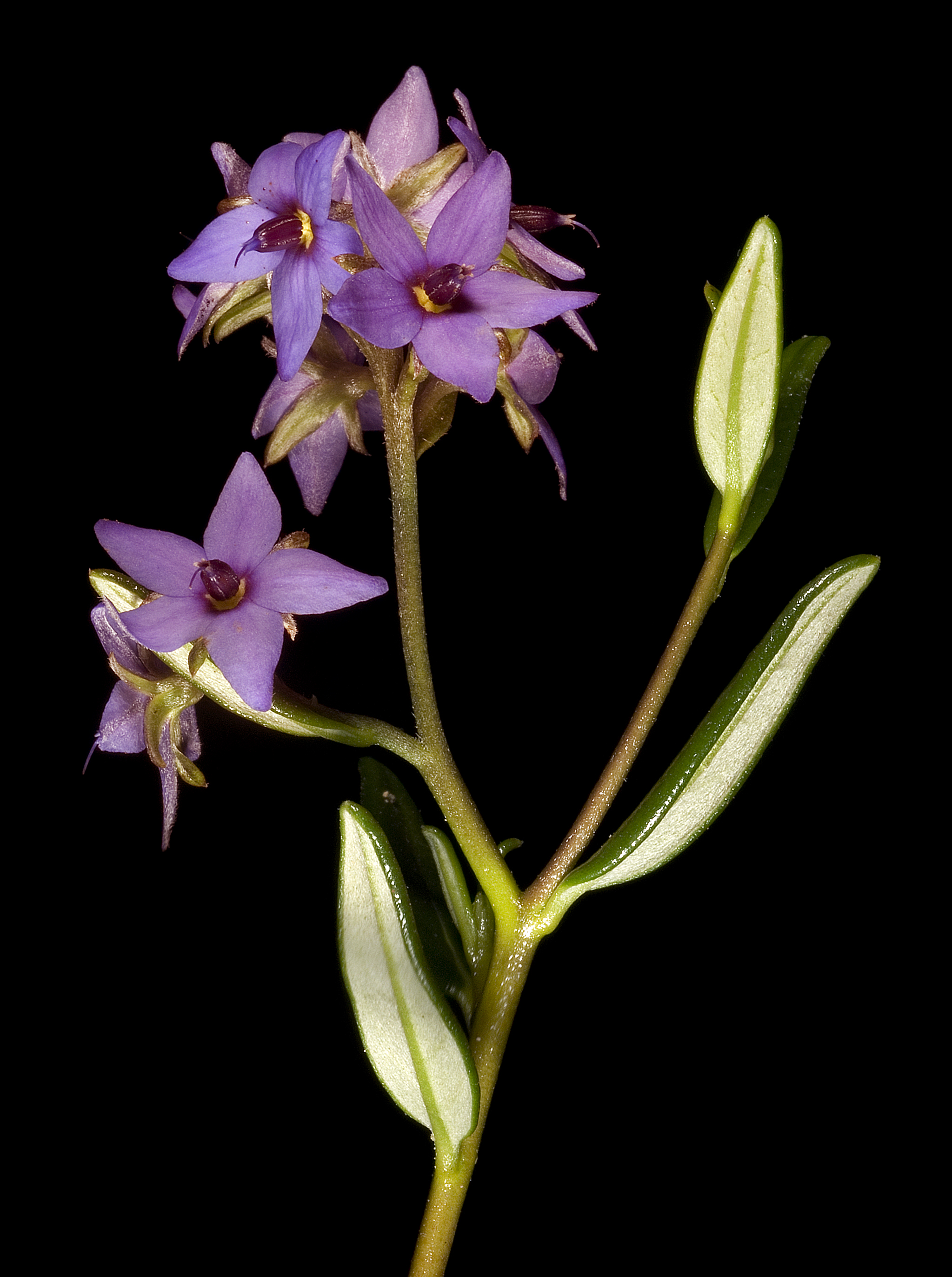
Halgania

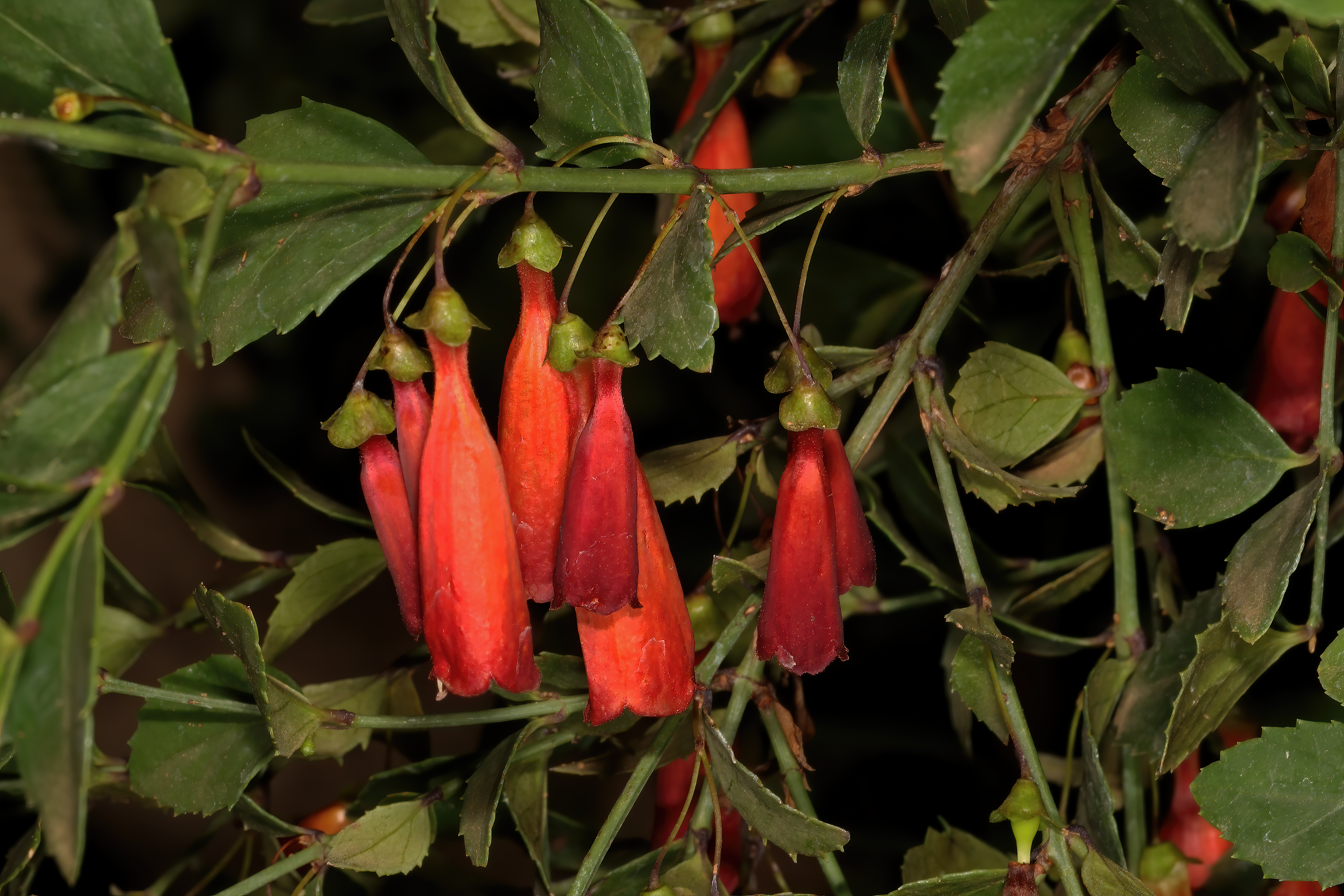
Halleria

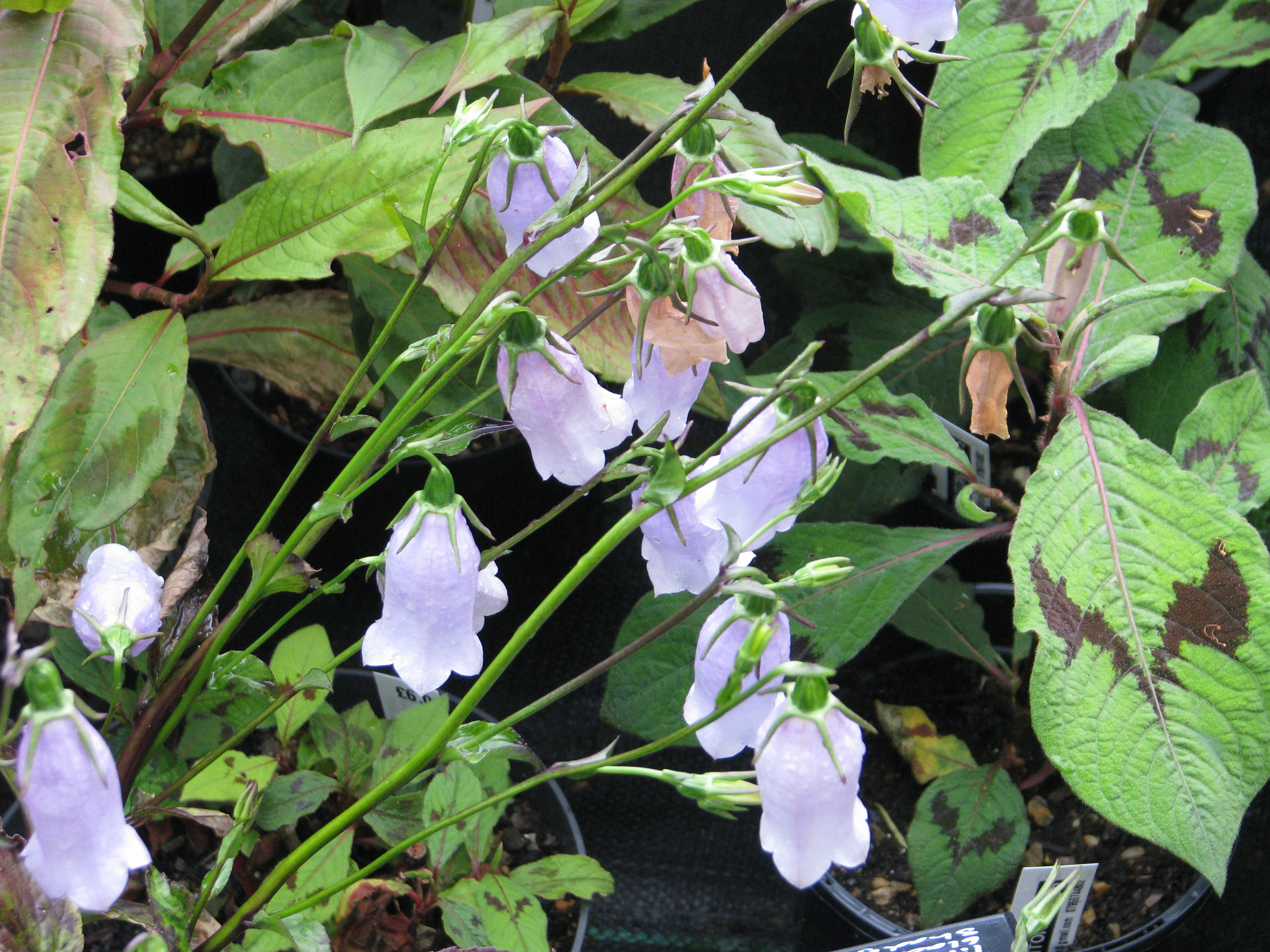
Hanabusaya

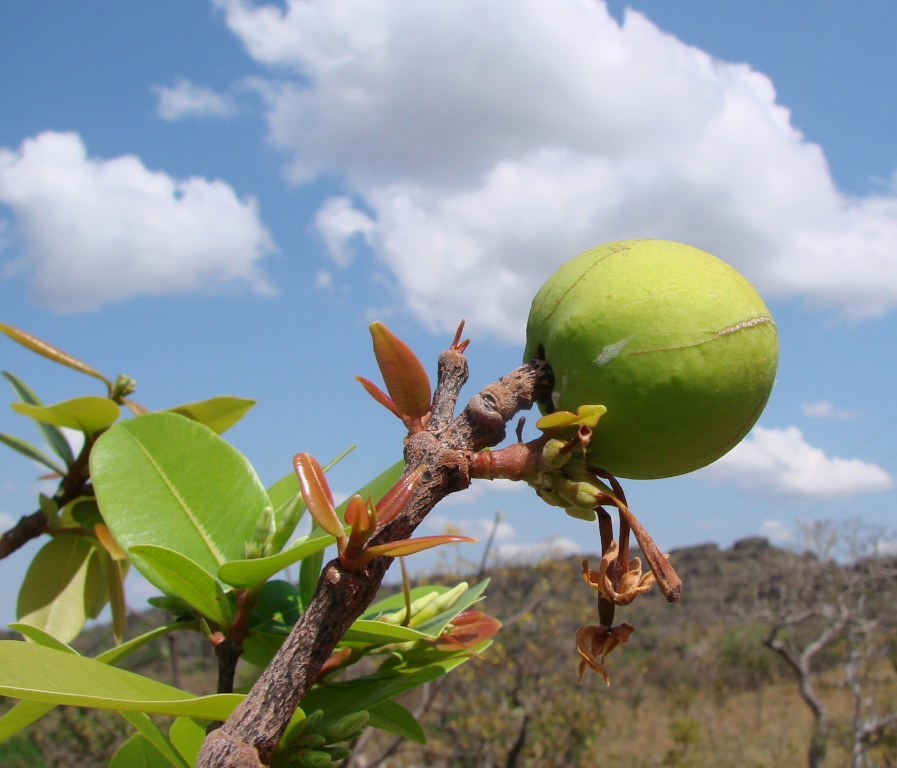
Hancornia

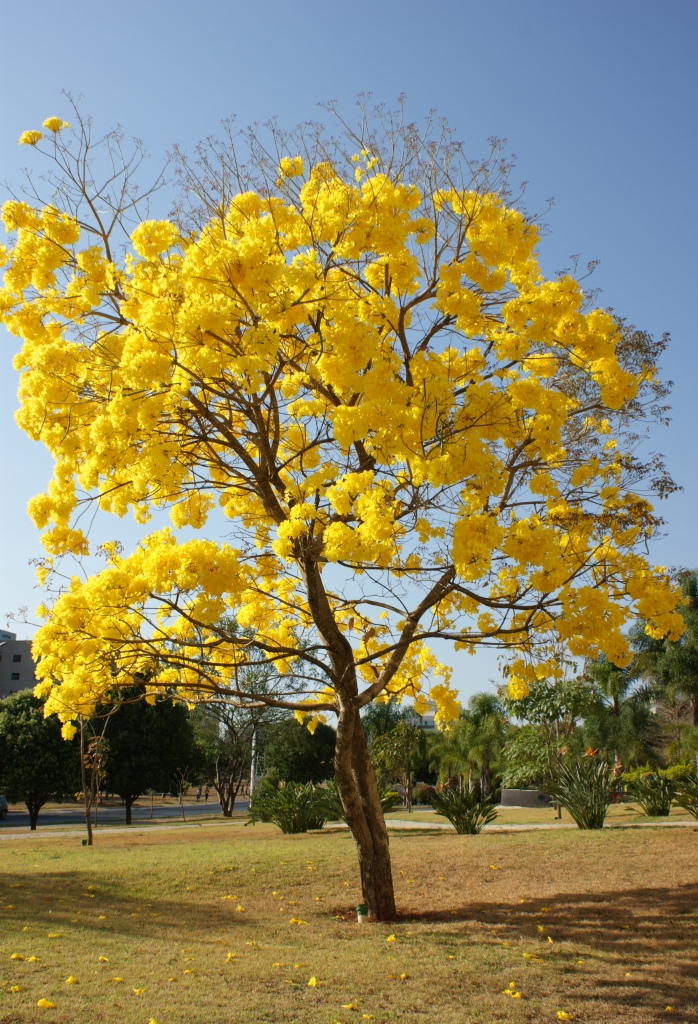
Handroanthus

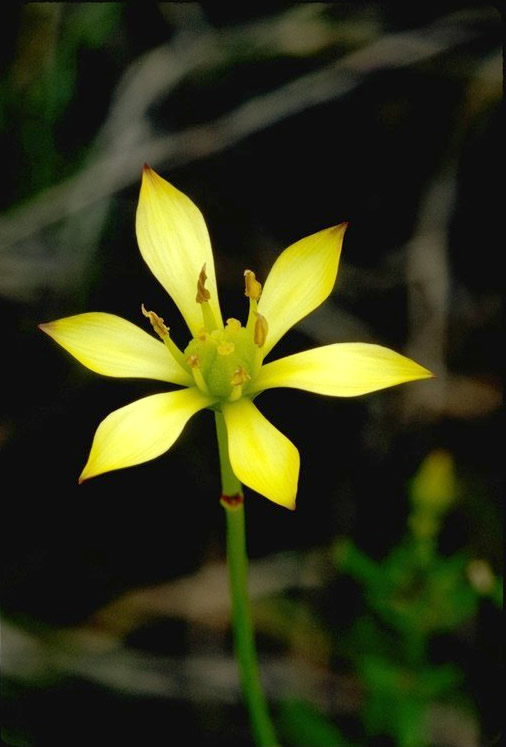
Harperocallis

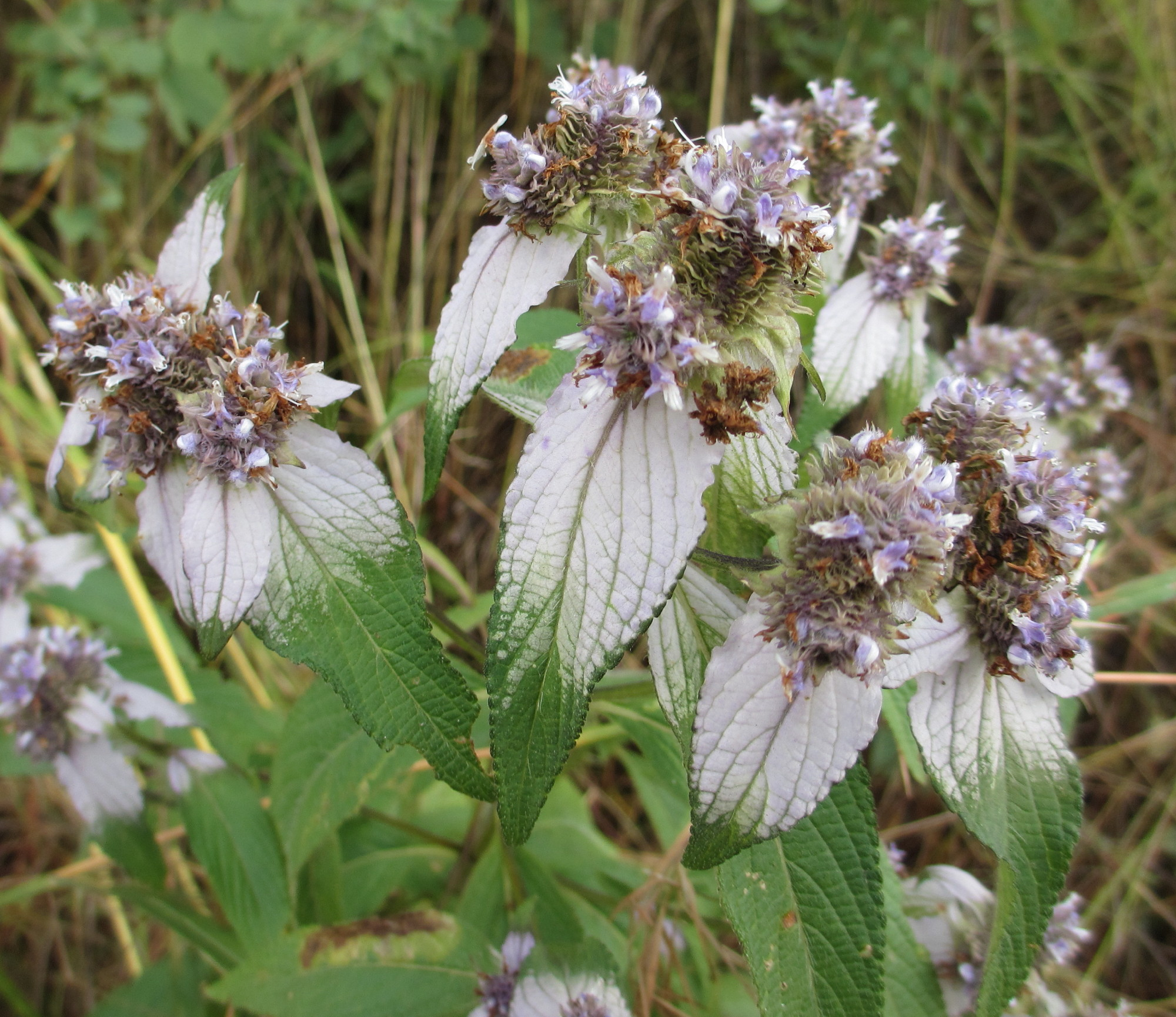
Haumaniastrum

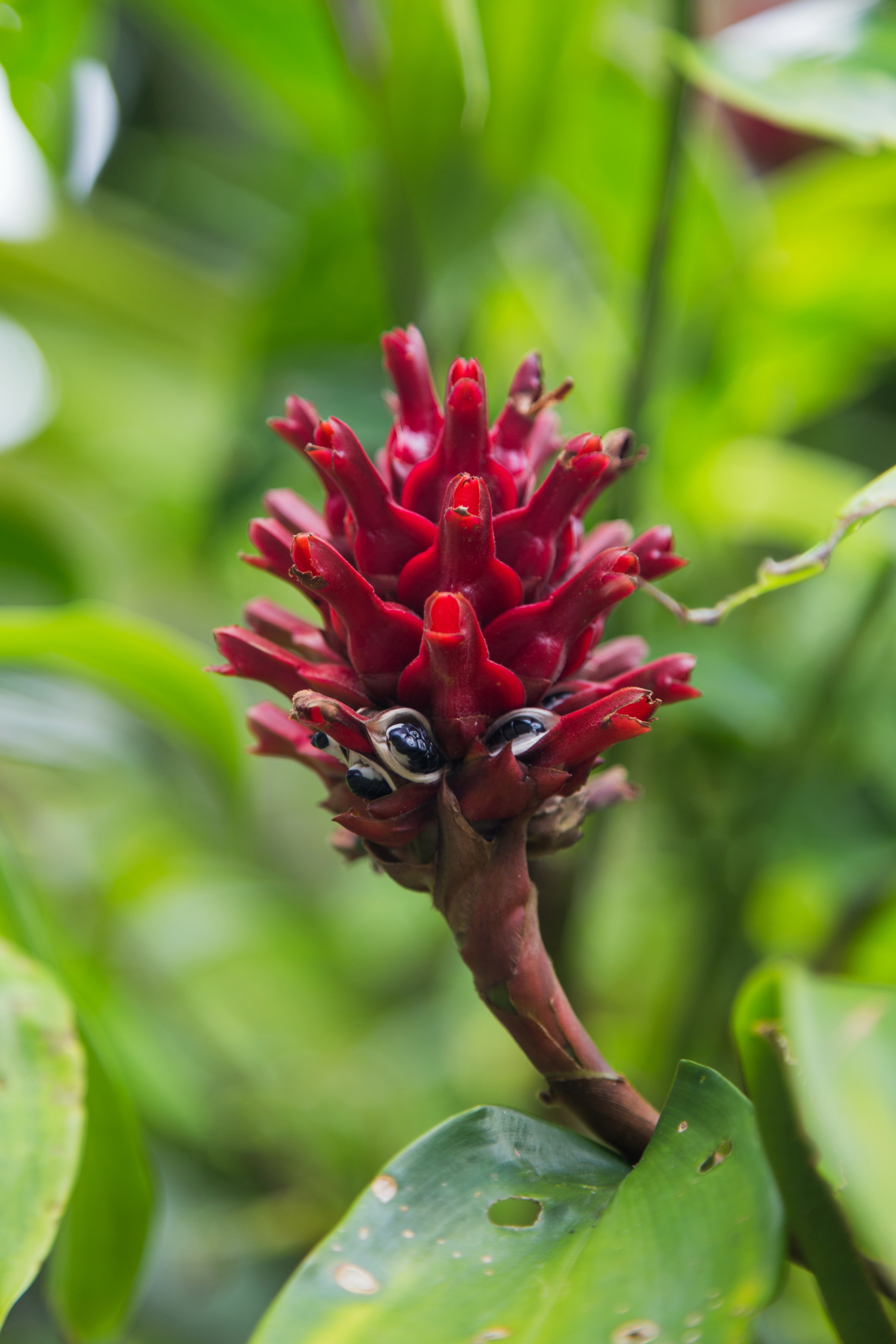
Hellenia

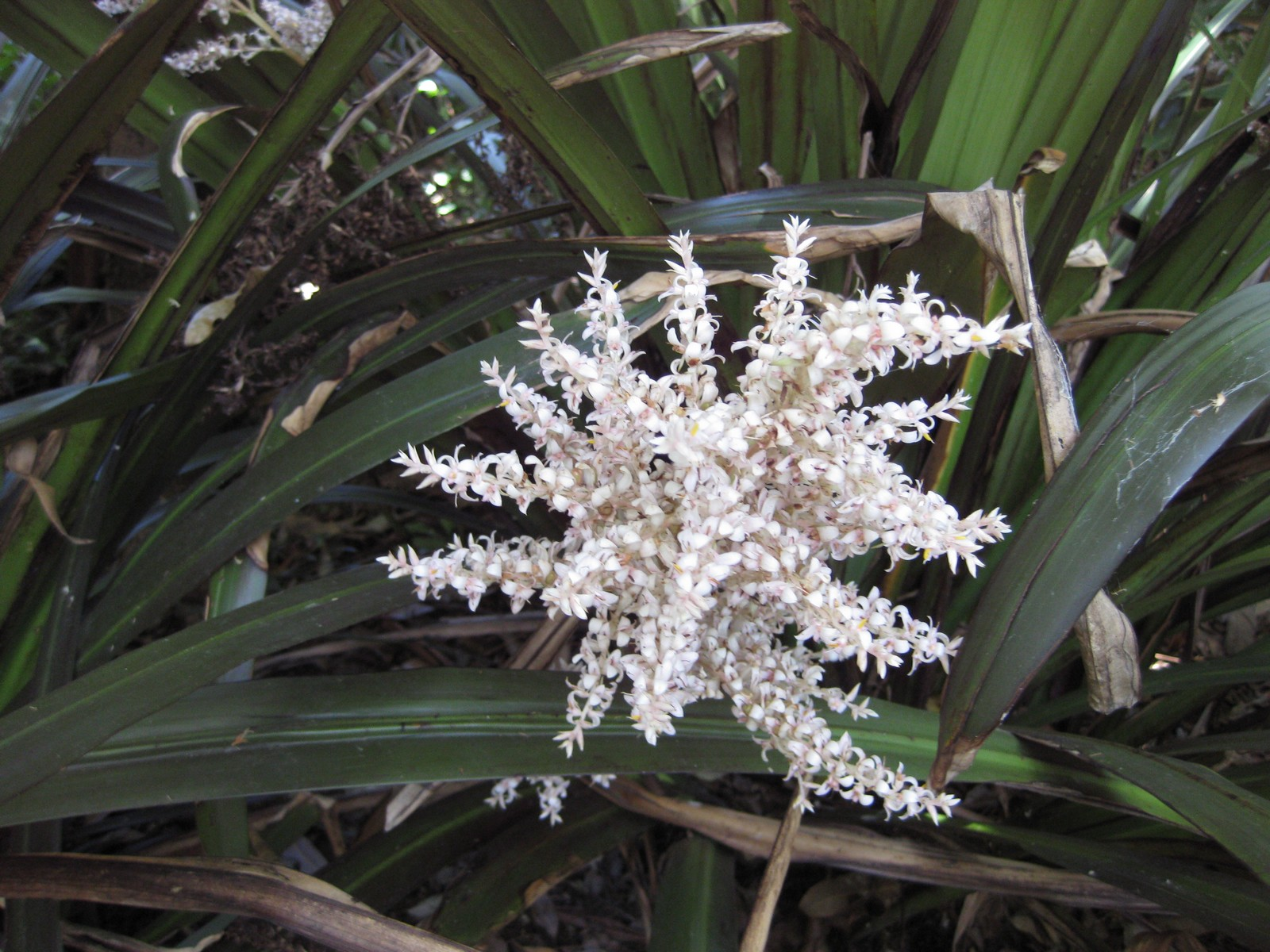
Helmholtzia

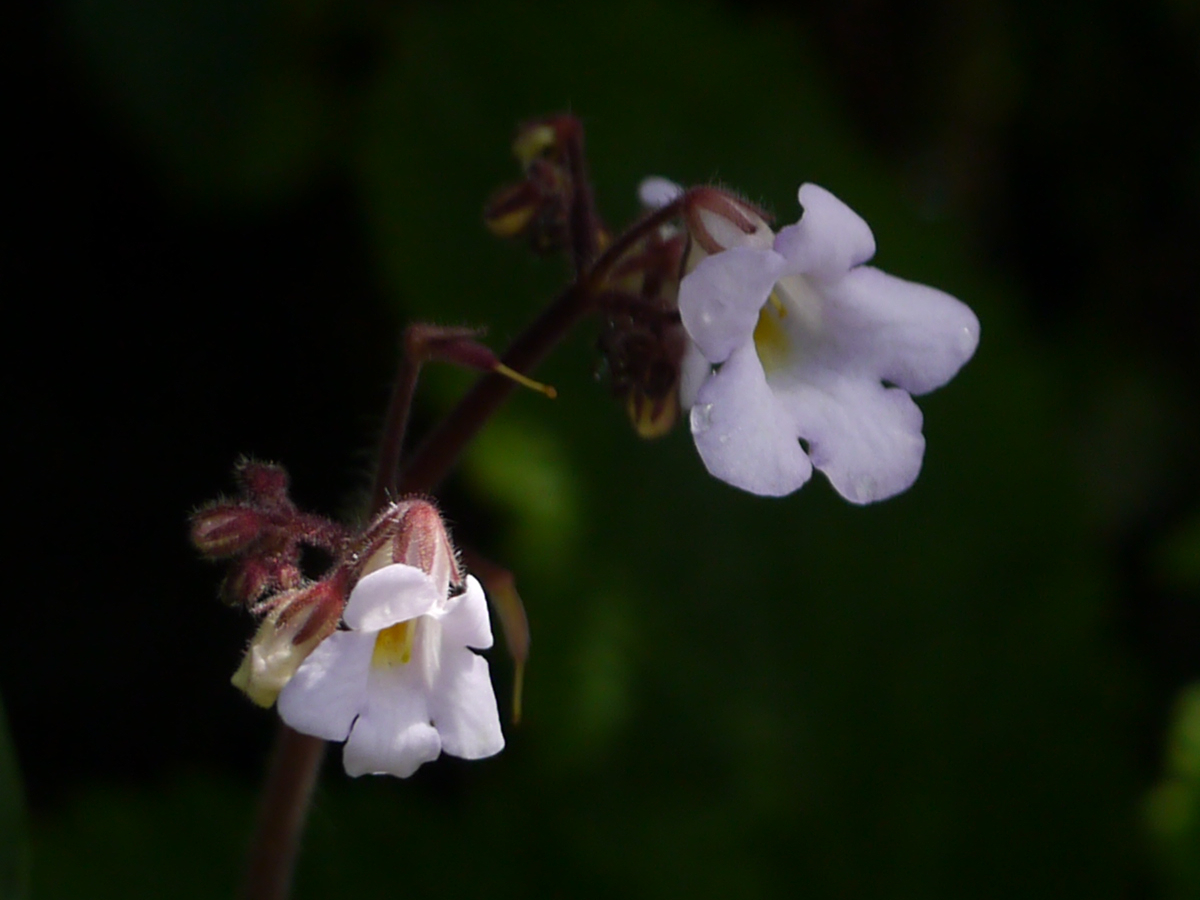
Henckelia

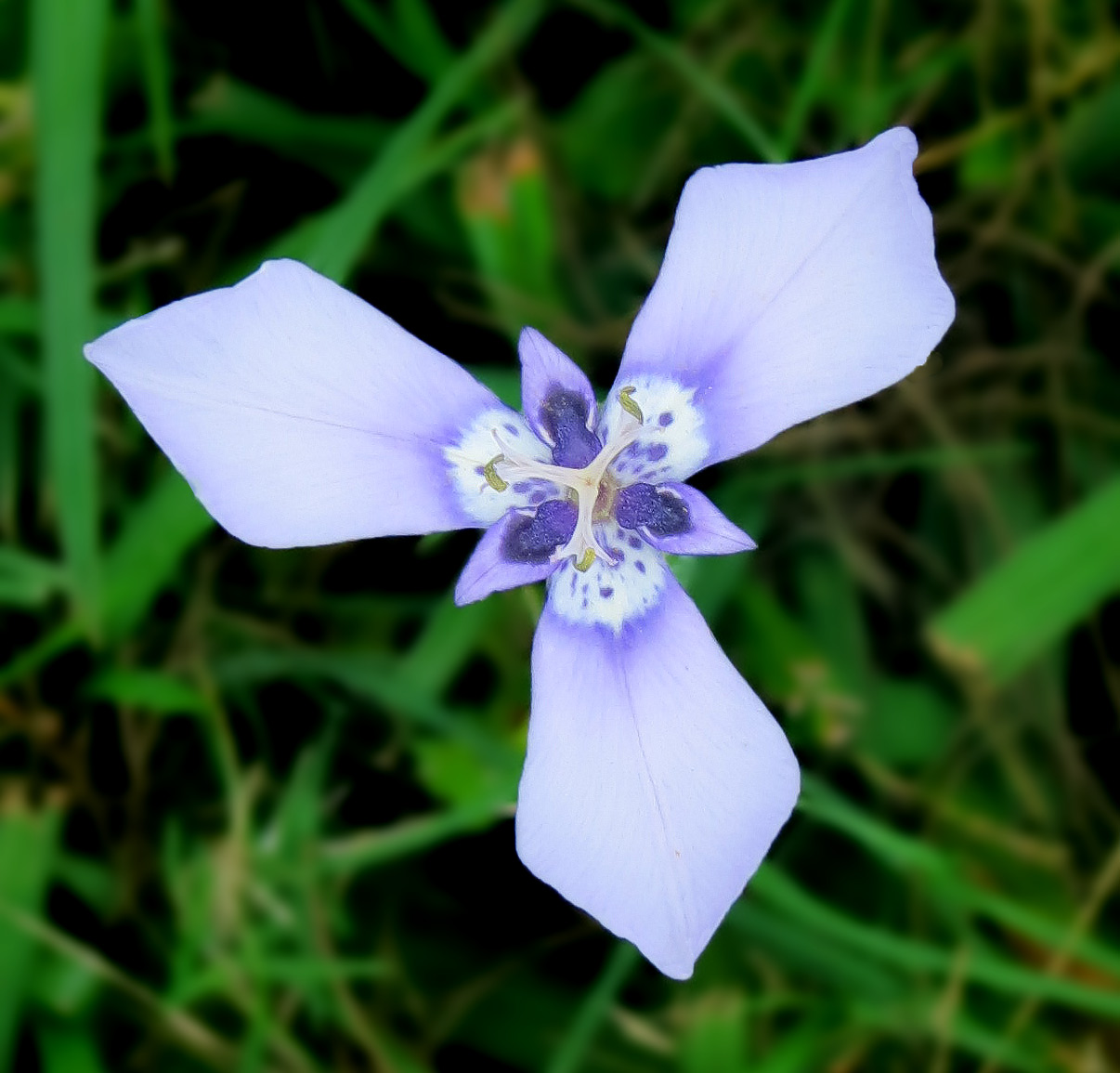
Herbertia

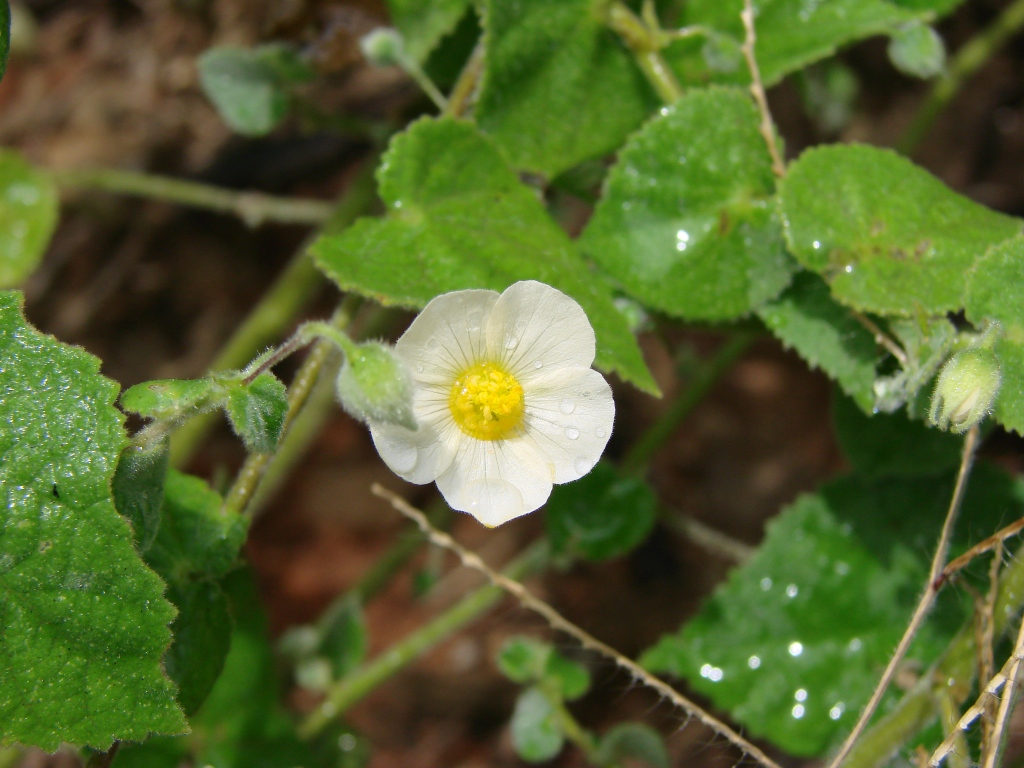
Herissantia

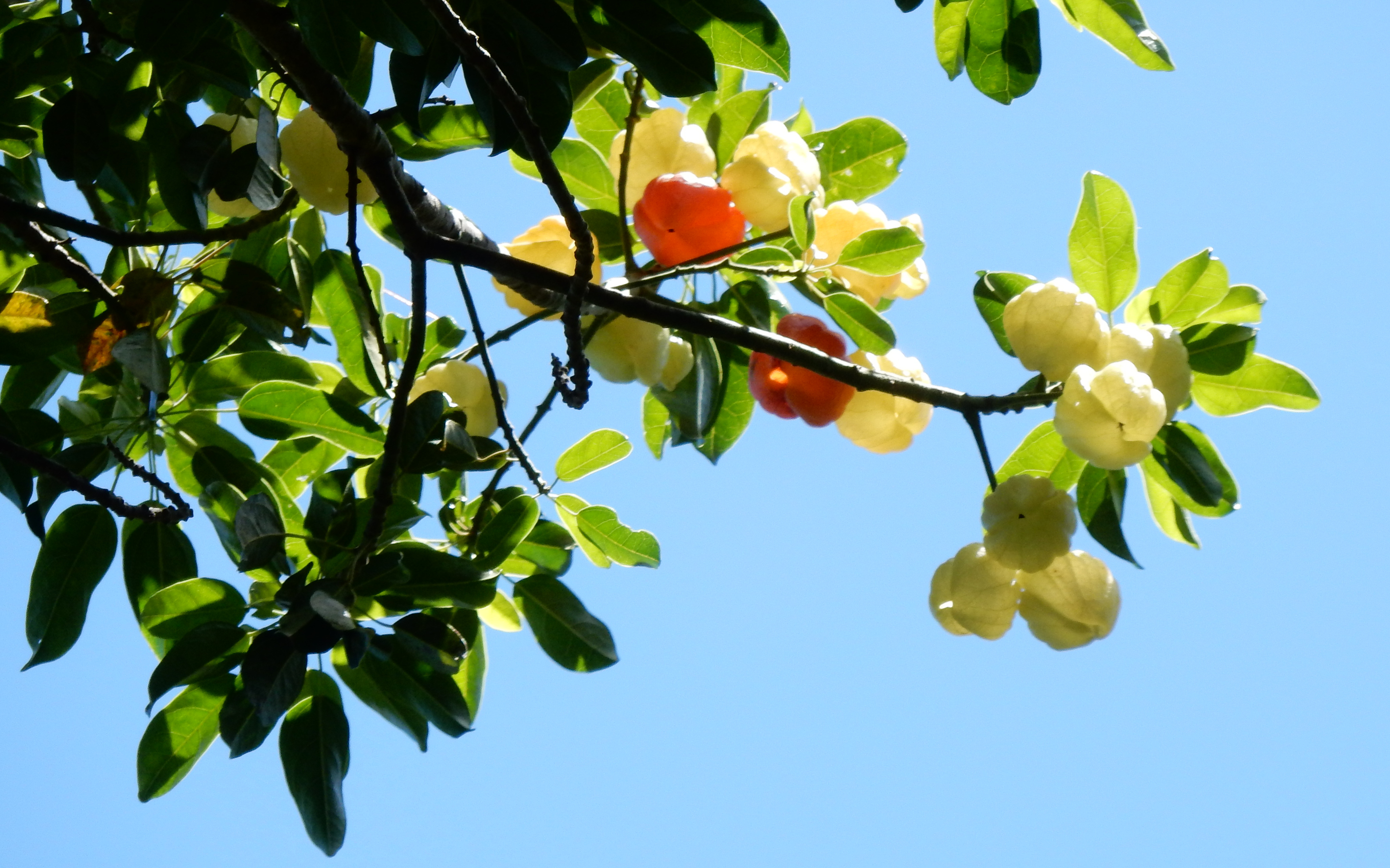
Hernandia

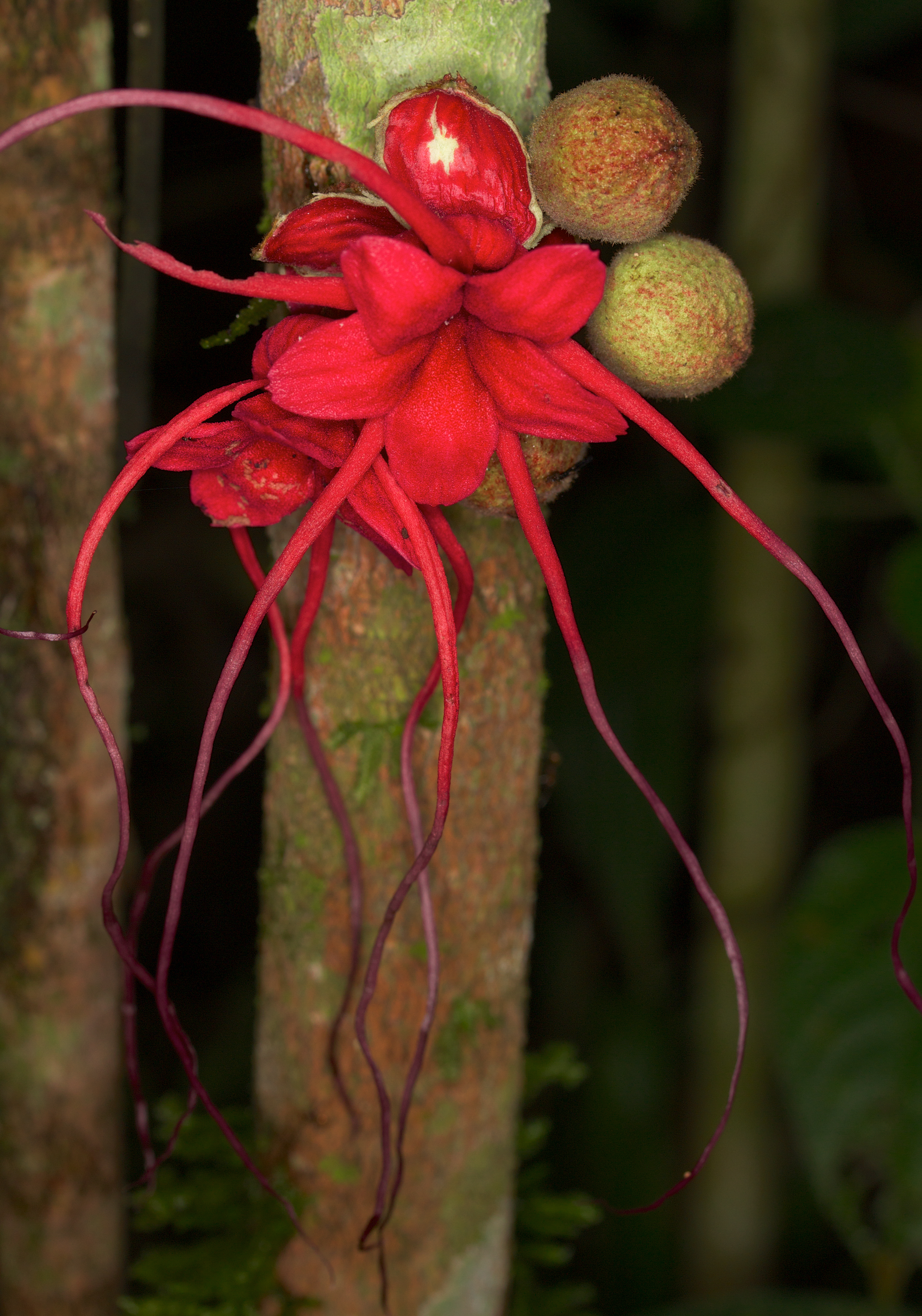
Herrania

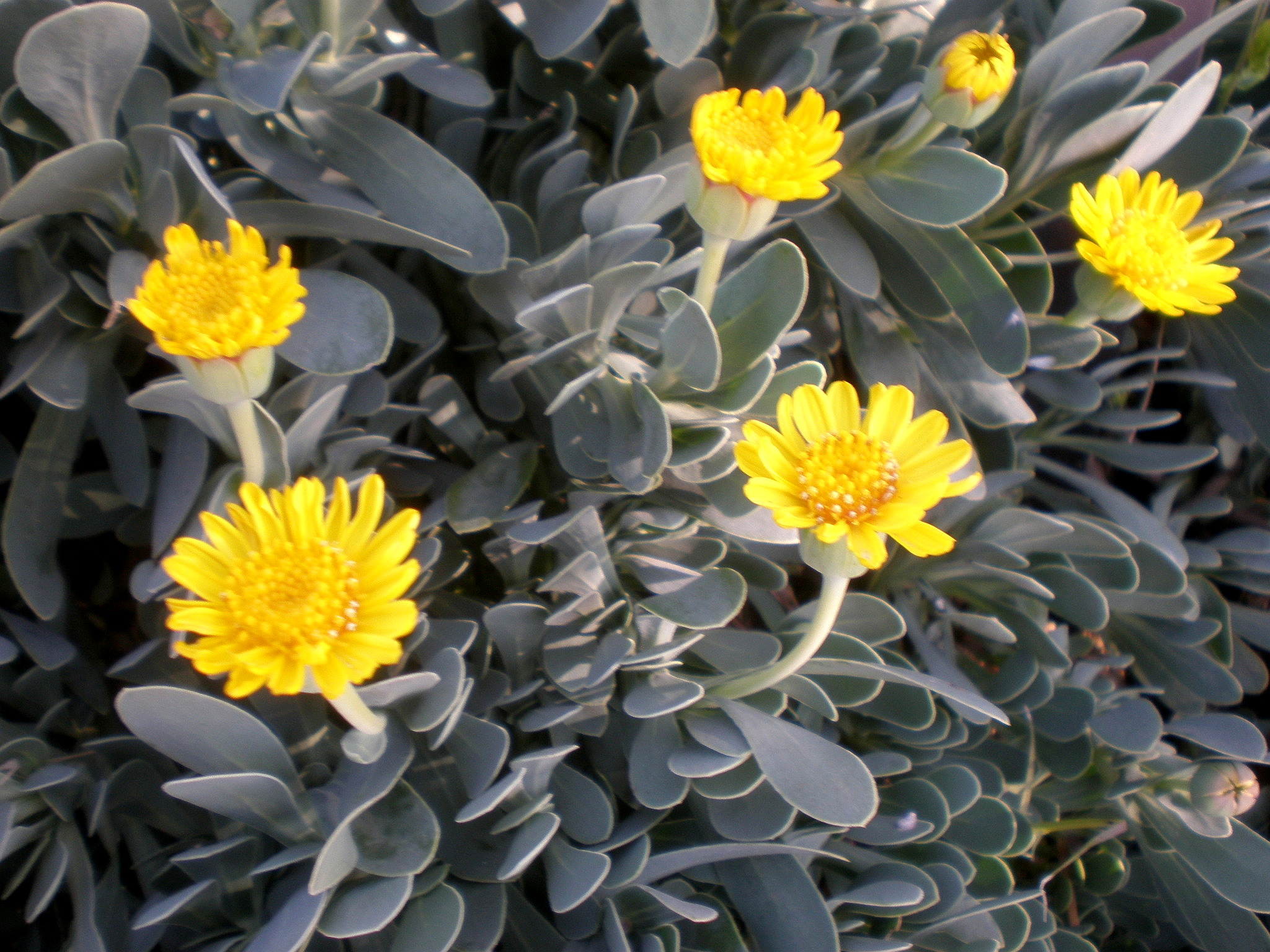
Hertia

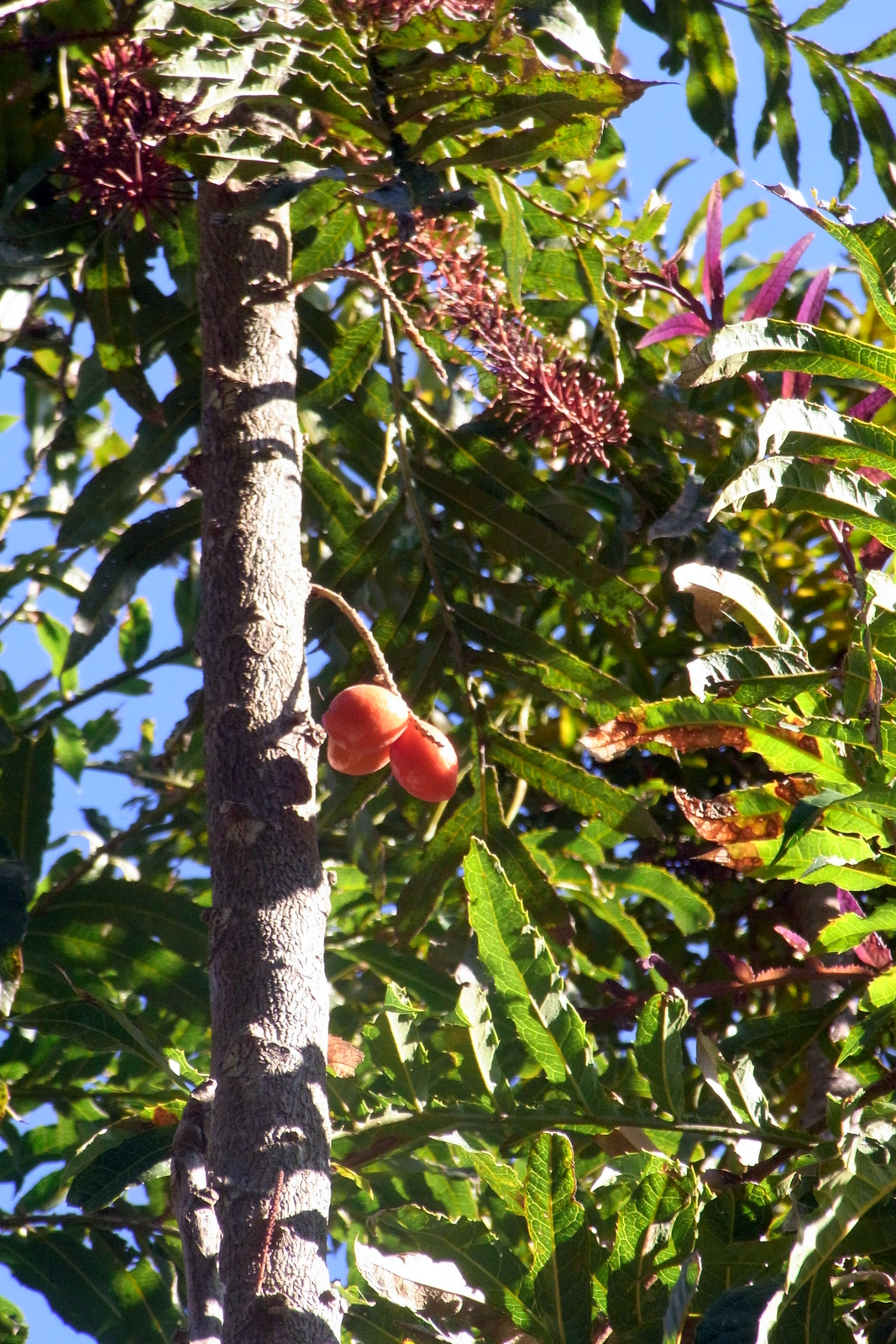
Hicksbeachia

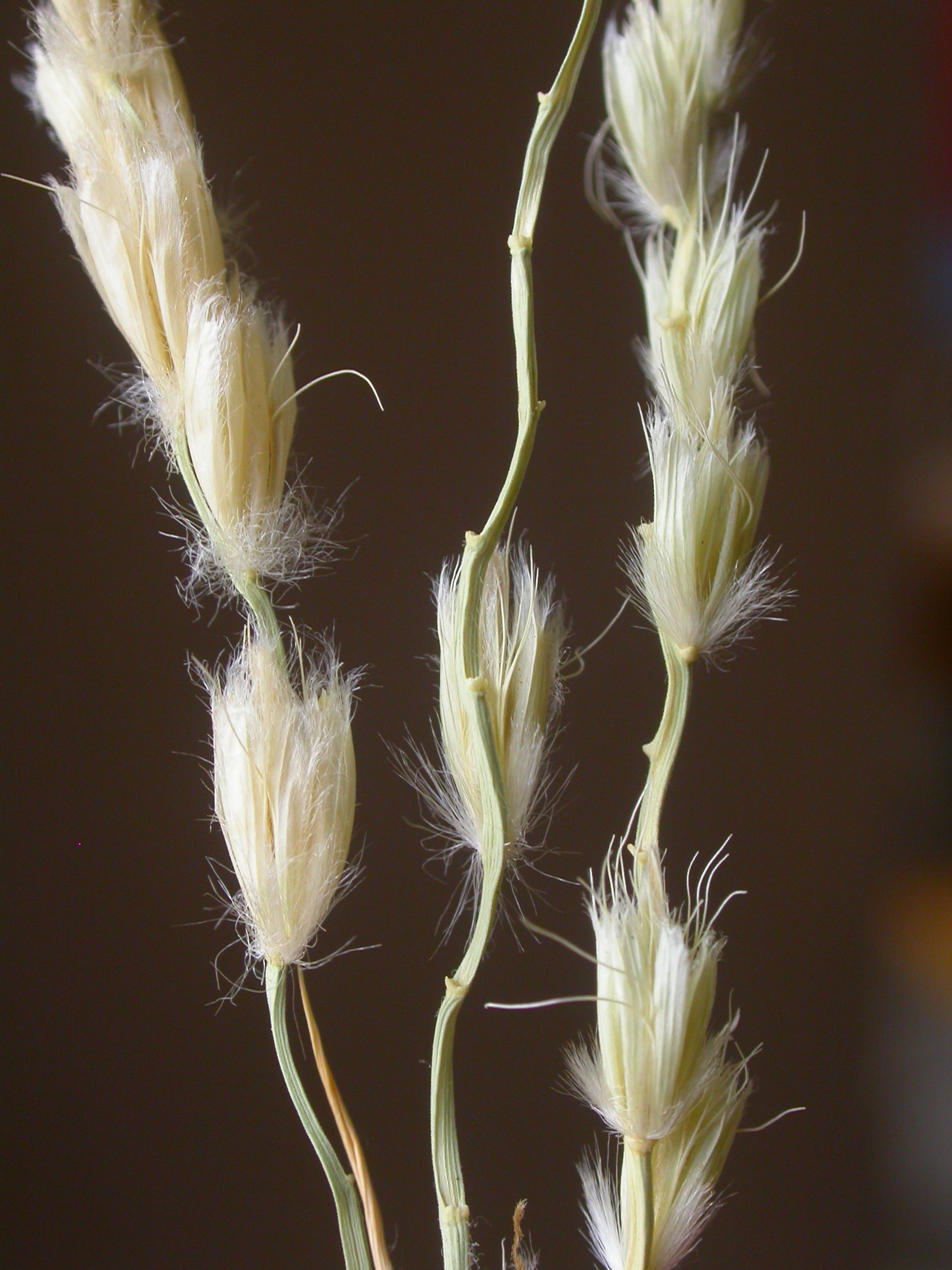
Hilaria

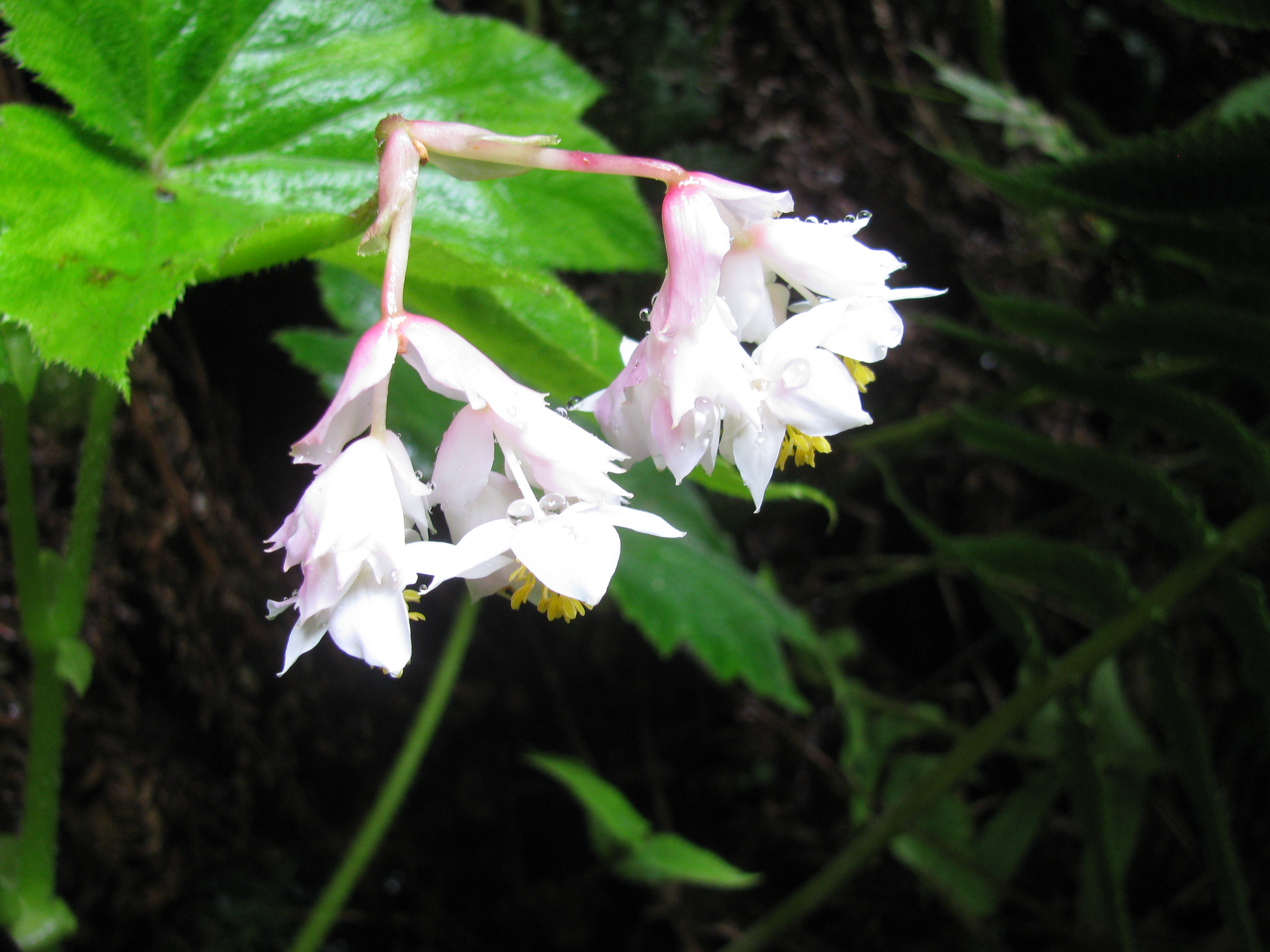
Hillebrandia

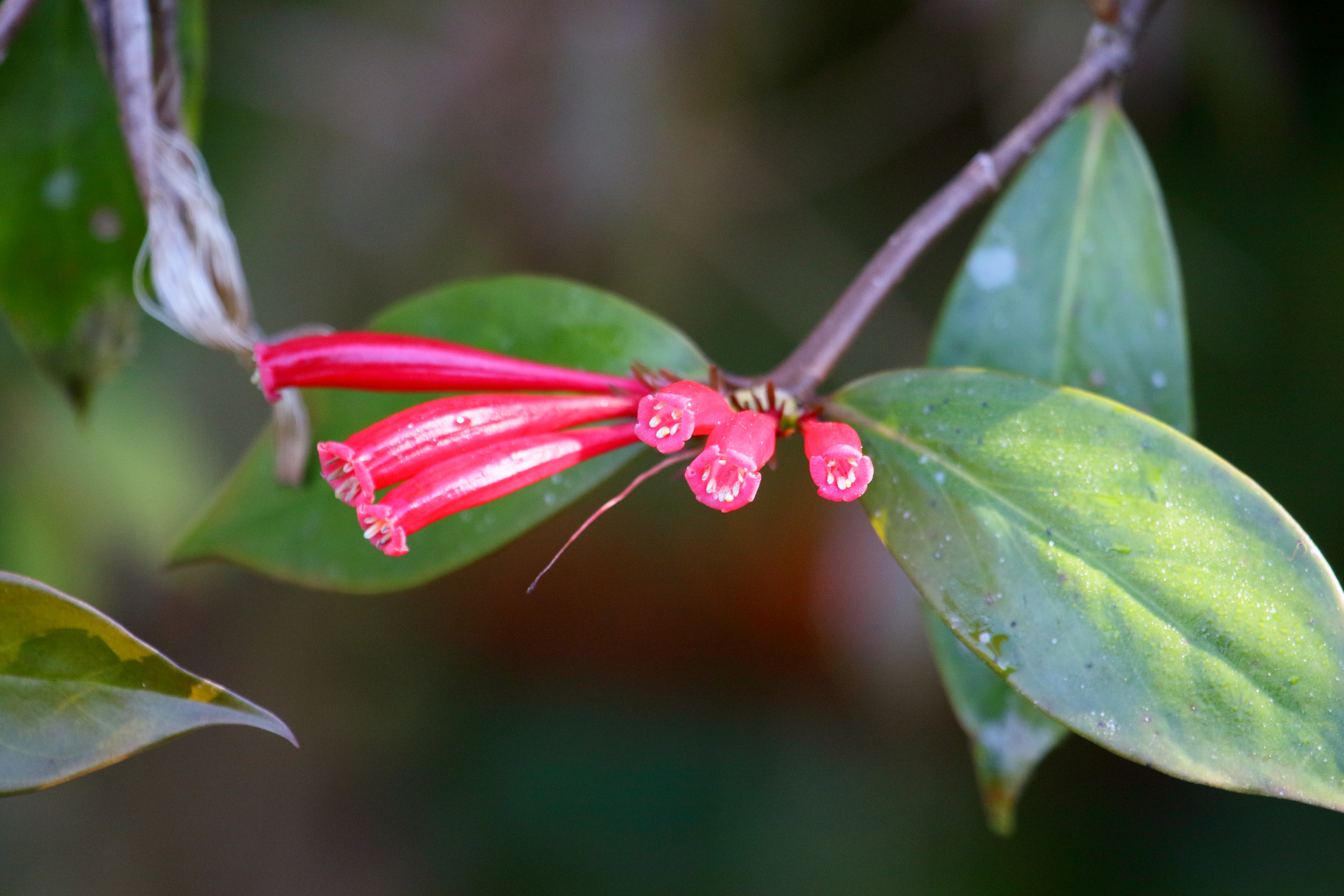
Hillia

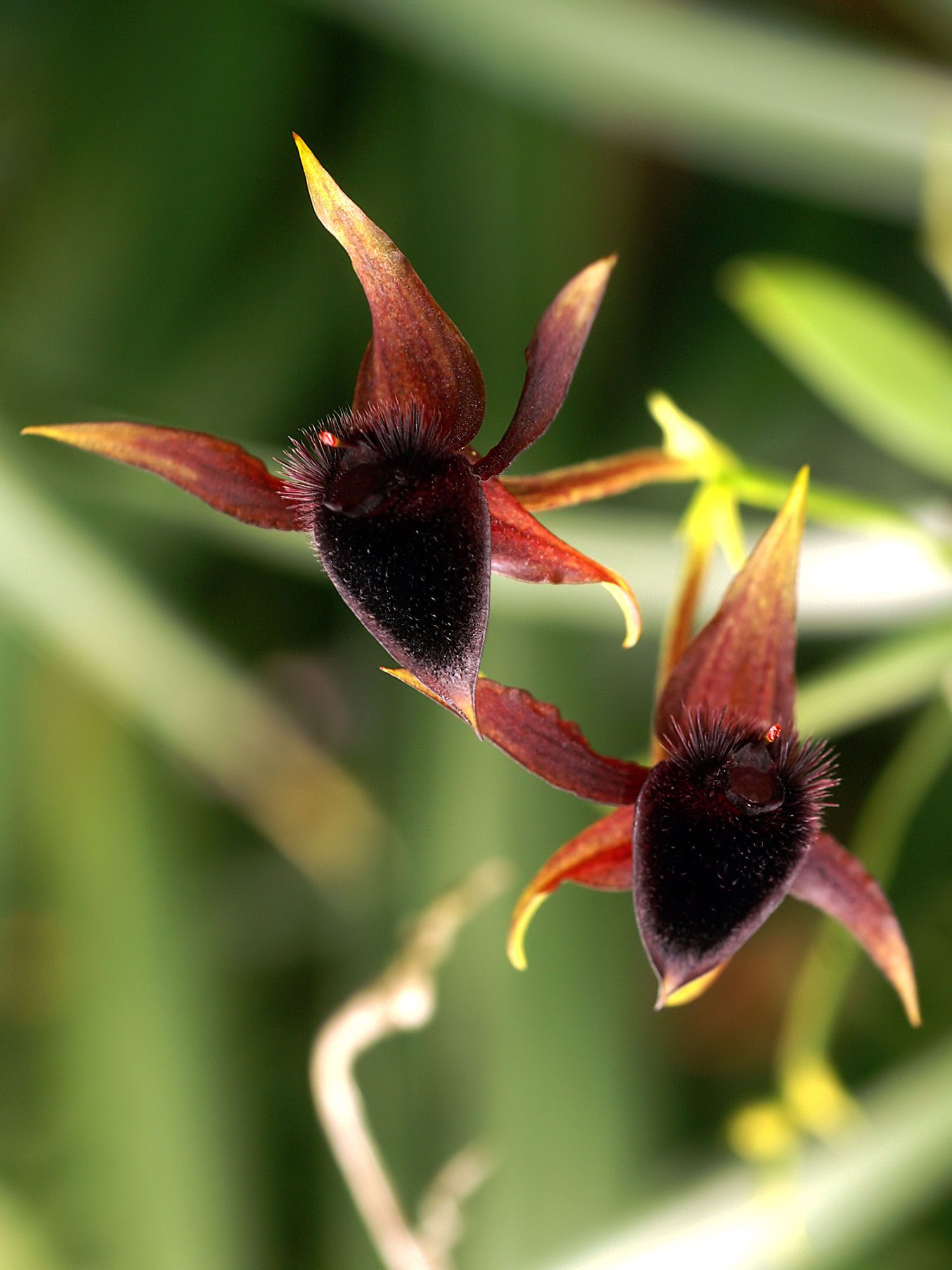
Hofmeisterella

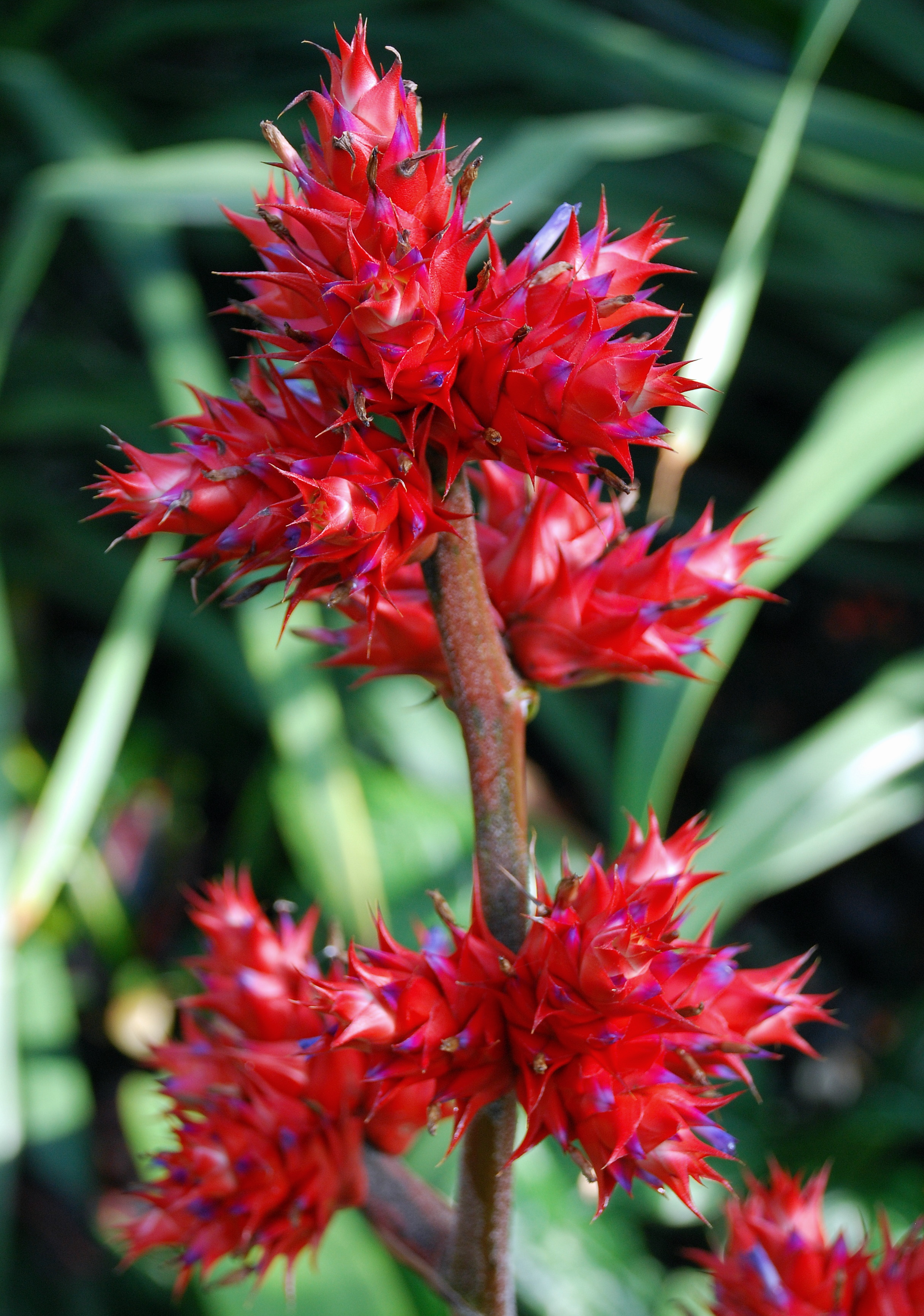
Hohenbergia

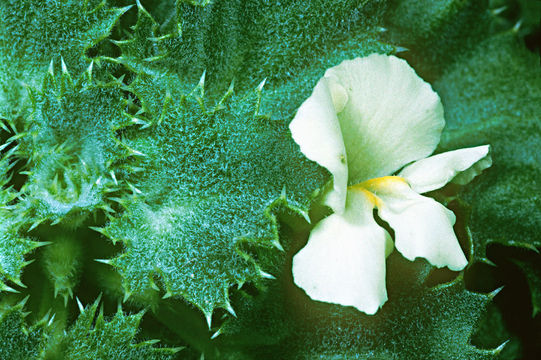
Holmgrenanthe

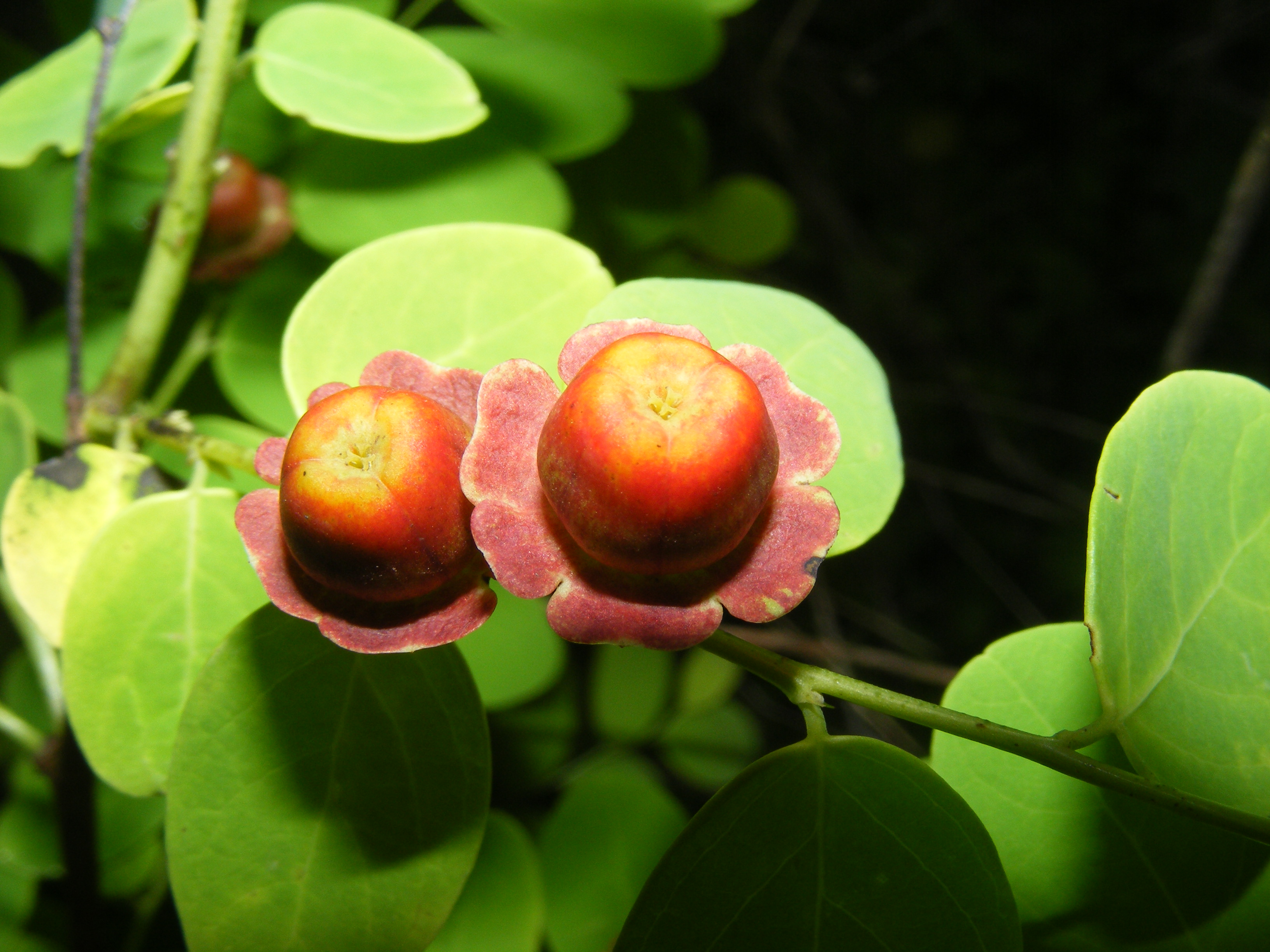
Holmskioldia

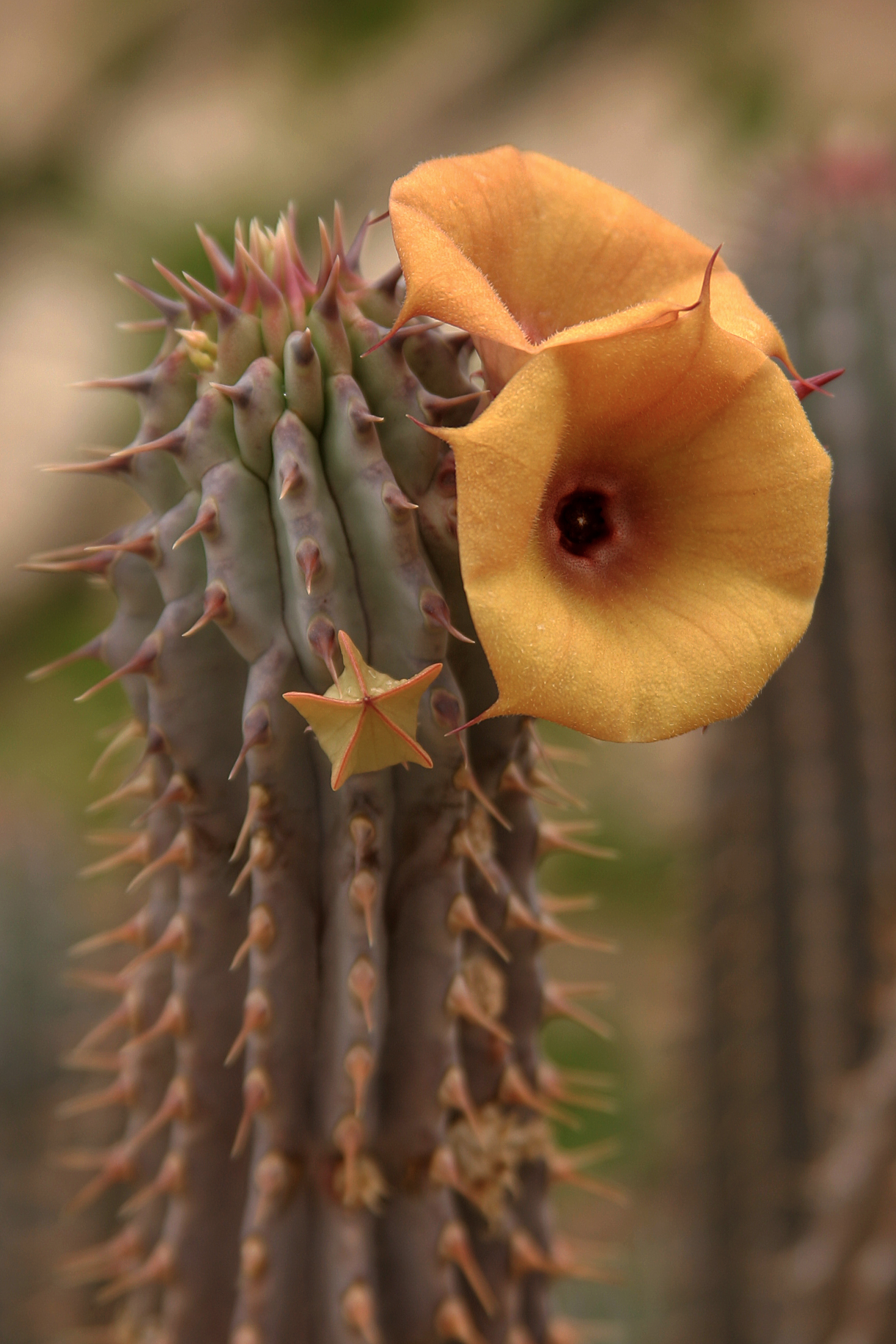
Hoodia

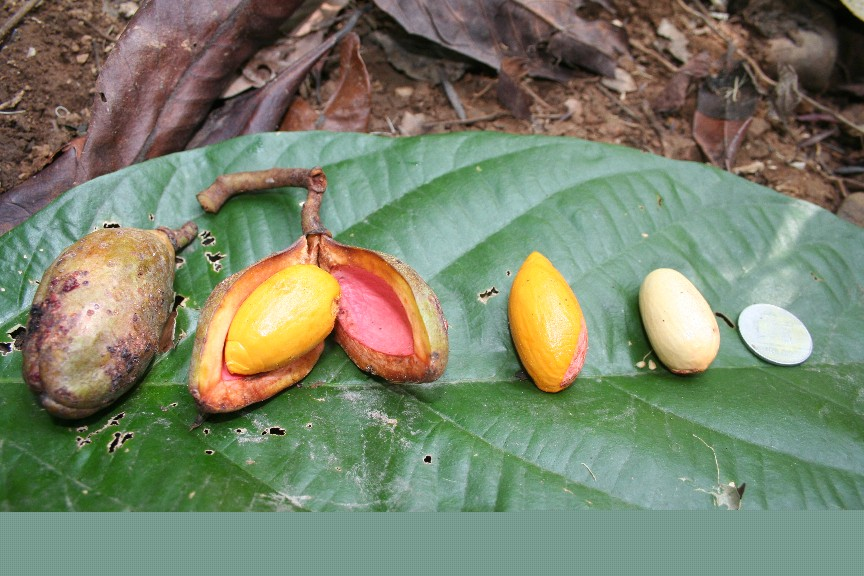
Horsfieldia

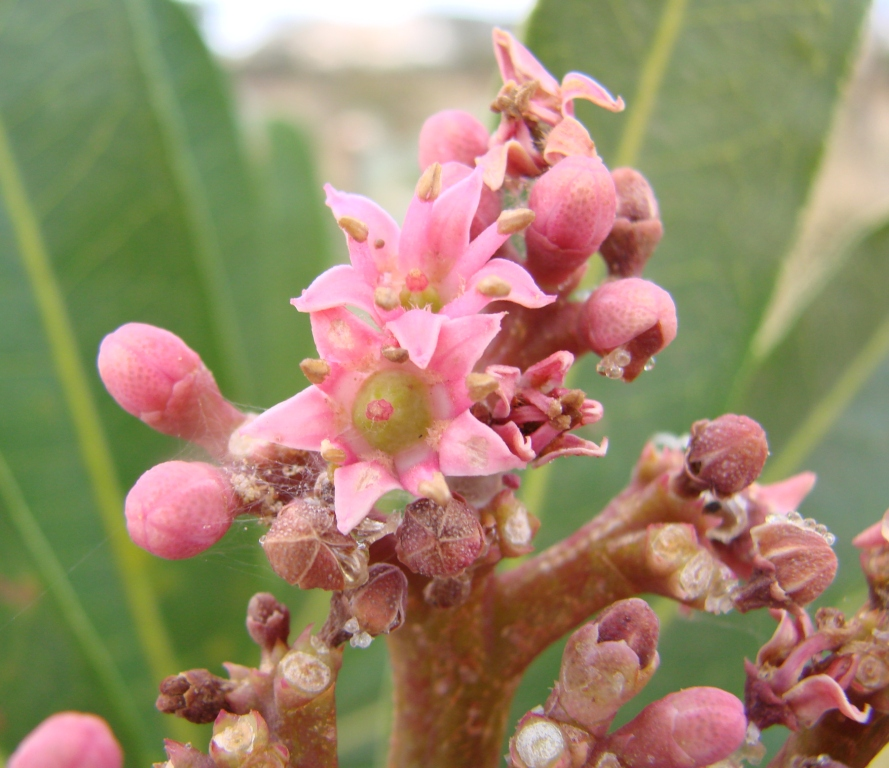
Hortia

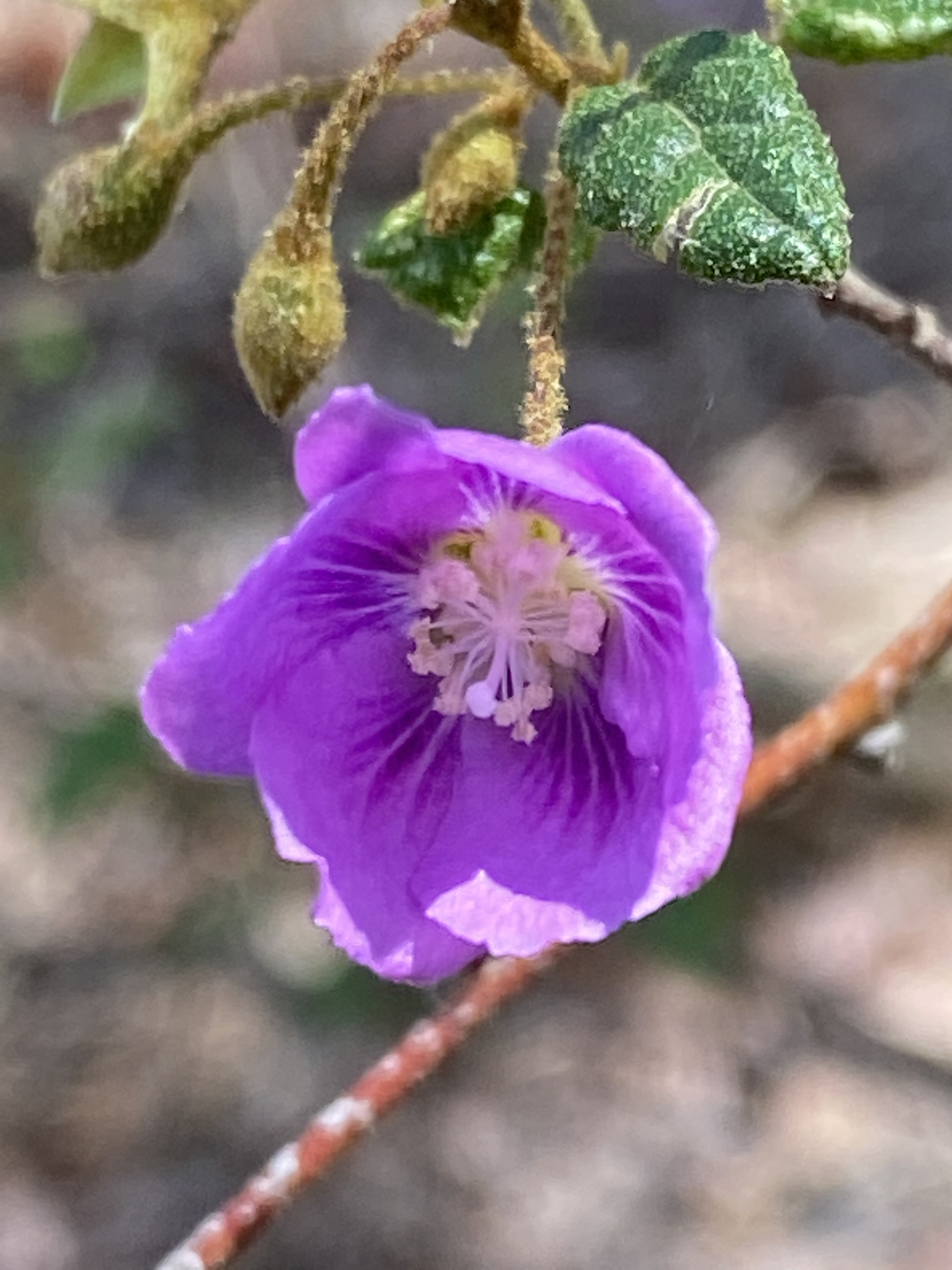
Howittia

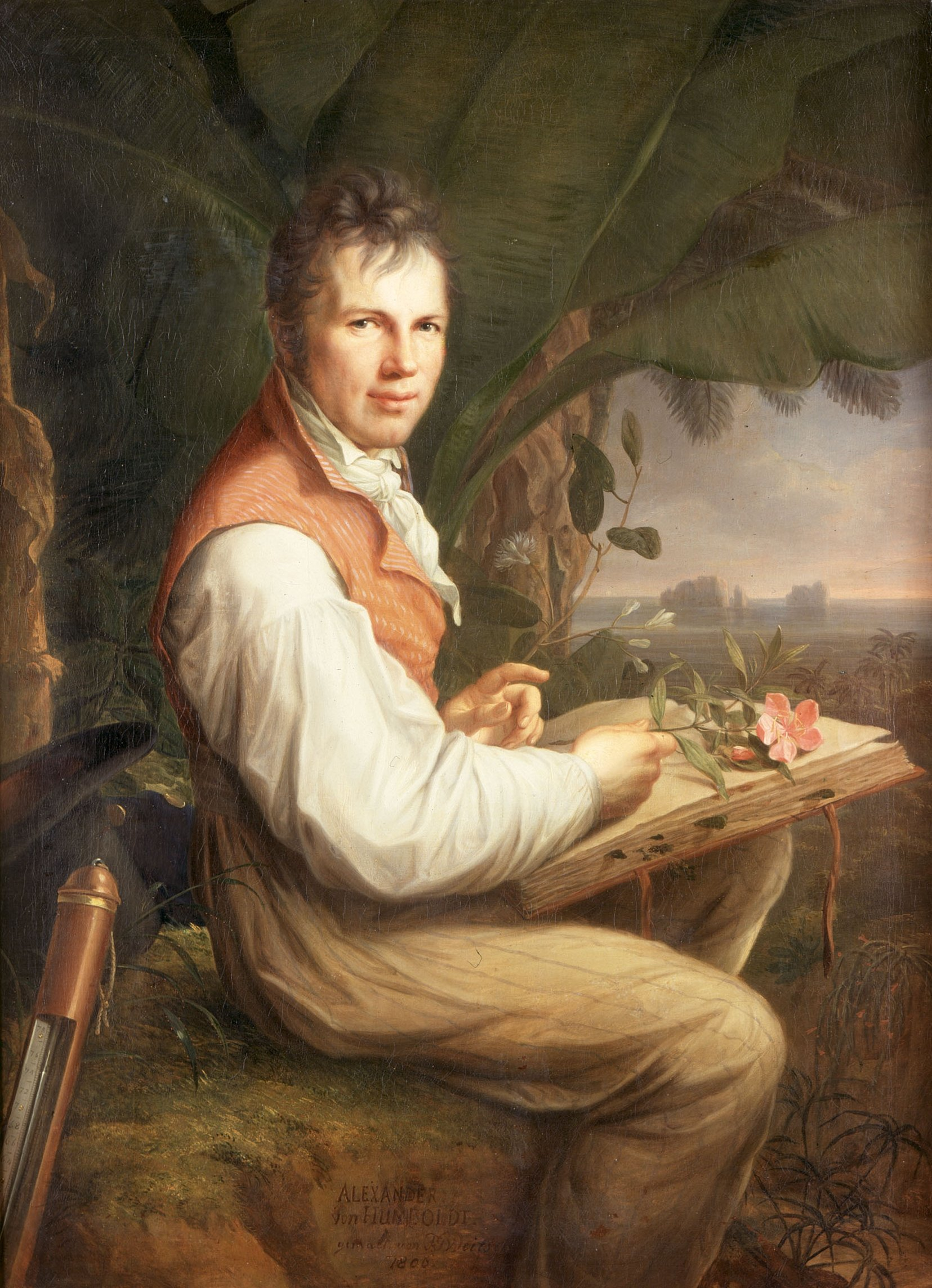
Portrait of Alexander von Humboldt by Friedrich Georg Weitsch

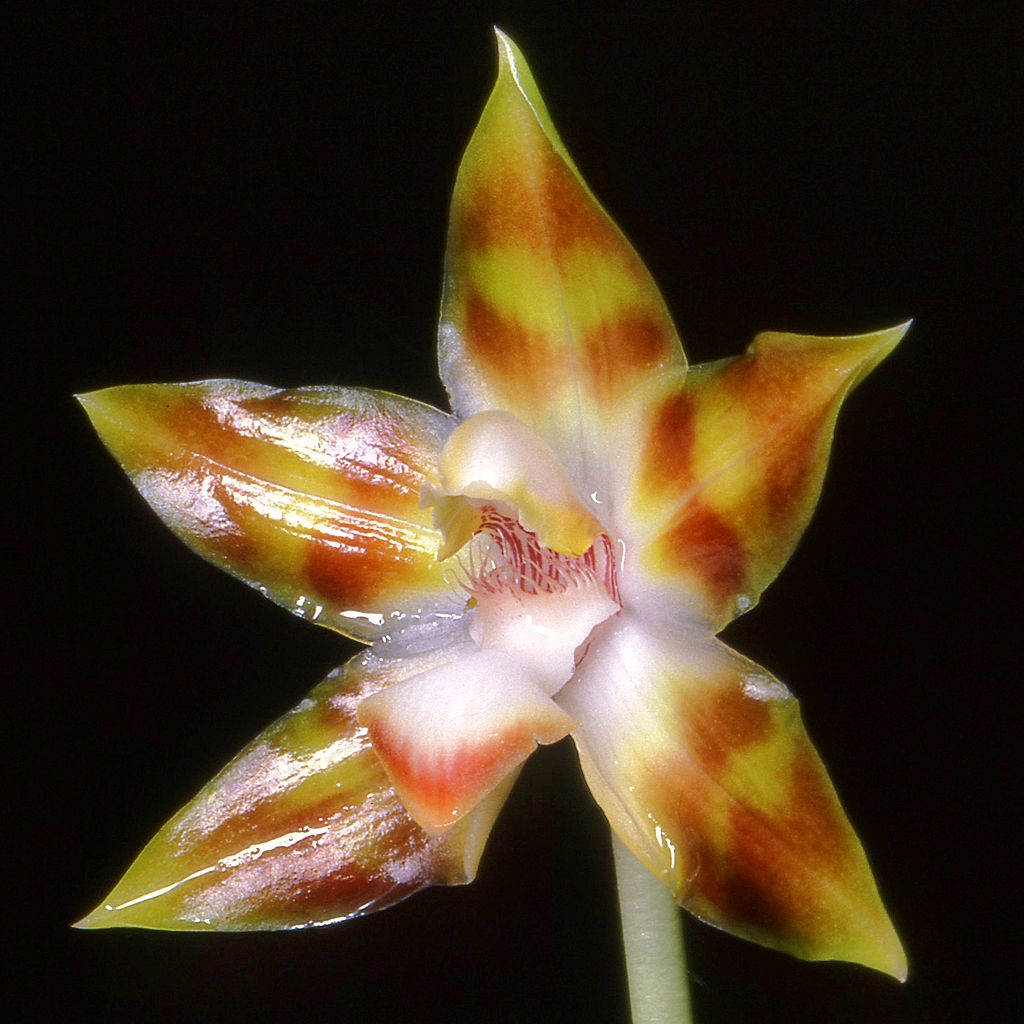
Huntleya

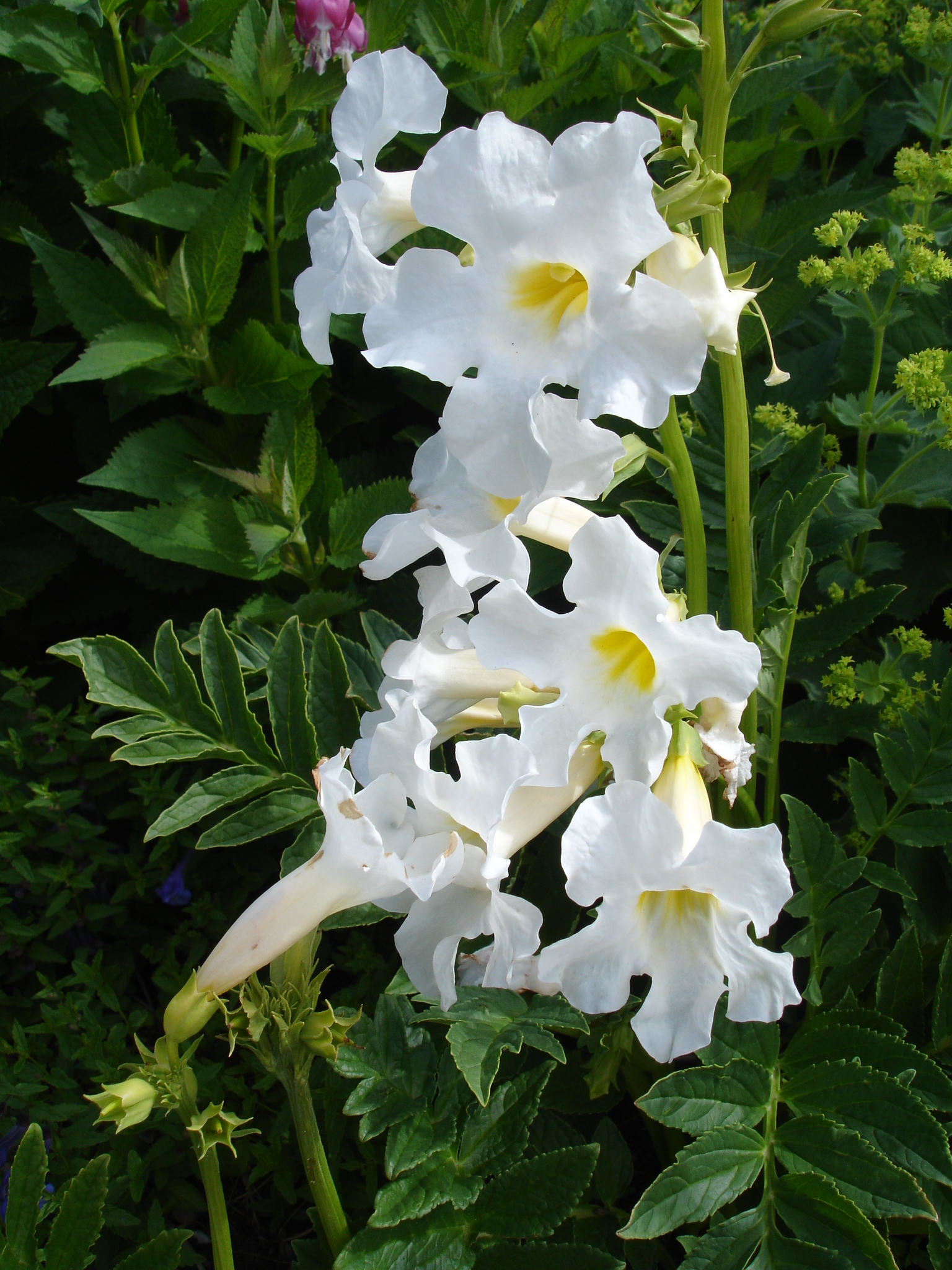
Incarvillea

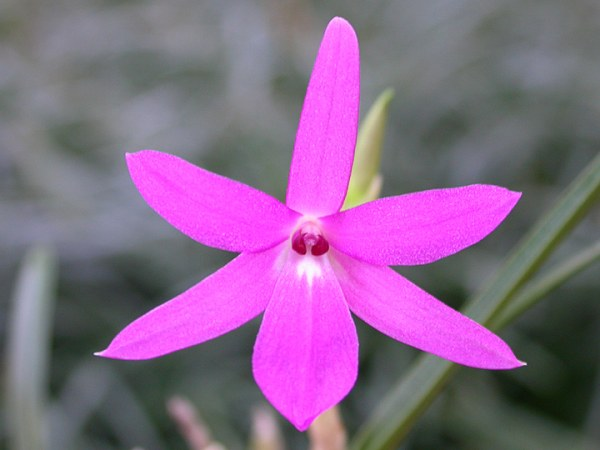
Isabelia

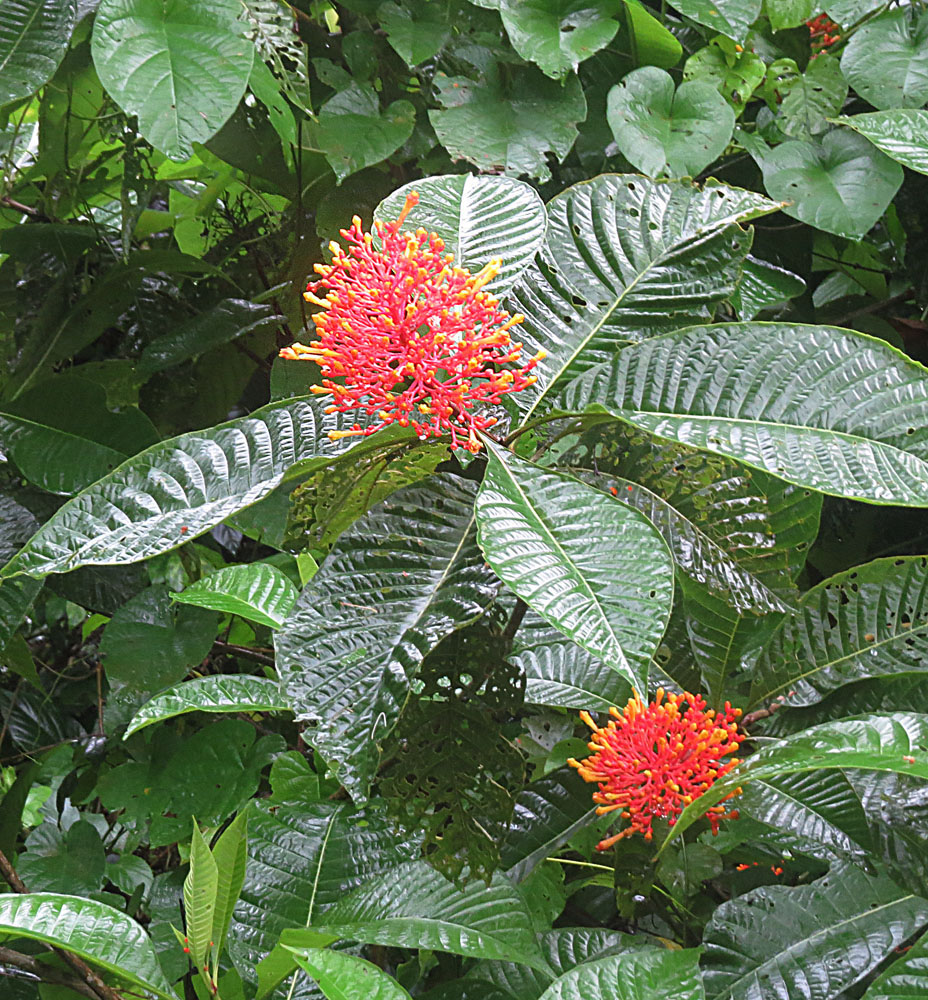
Isertia

Genera
| Genus (Note: Page numbers for references are omitted, since all the references list genera alphabetically except for Plants of the World, which is mainly cited for genera that match their family names.) | Person honored (Note: Except for the people with an indication in their name or description that they were known for something else, all are remembered for their work as naturalists, including amateur and professional botanists, mycologists, zoologists, apothecaries, geologists, geographers and meteorologists.) | Plant family | Ref |
|---|---|---|---|
| Daboecia | Saint Dabheog (5th century) | Ericaceae | Co |
| Daenikera | Albert Ulrich Daeniker (1894–1957), Swiss professor at ETH Zurich and director of the city's botanical museum and garden | Santalaceae | Bu |
| Dahlia | Anders Dahl (1751–1789) | Asteraceae | Co |
| Dahliaphyllum | Anders Dahl (1751–1789) | Apiaceae | Bu |
| Dahlstedtia | Gustav Adolf Hugo Dahlstedt (1856–1934) | Fabaceae | Qu |
| Dalbergia | Nils Dalberg (1736–1820) and his brother Carl Gustav Dahlberg (1721–1781) | Fabaceae | St |
| Dalbergiella | Nils Dalberg (1736–1820) and his brother Carl Gustav Dahlberg (1721–1781) | Fabaceae | Qu |
| Dalea | Samuel Dale (1659–1739) | Fabaceae | Co |
| Dalechampia | Jacques Daléchamps (1513–1588) | Euphorbiaceae | St |
| Dalembertia | Jean le Rond d'Alembert (1717–1783), scientist | Euphorbiaceae | Bu |
| Dalhousiea | Christian Ramsay (1786–1839) and/or her husband George Ramsay, 9th Earl of Dalhousie (1770–1838) | Fabaceae | Bu |
| Dalibarda | Thomas-François Dalibard (1709–1778), physicist | Rosaceae | Bu |
| Dalrympelea | Alexander Dalrymple (1737–1808) | Staphyleaceae | Bu |
| Dalzellia | Nicol Alexander Dalzell (1817–1878) | Podostemaceae | Qu |
| Damburneya | Louis Auguste Damburney (1722–1795), French merchant who researched plants used in dyes | Lauraceae | Bu |
| Dampiera | William Dampier (1651–1715) | Goodeniaceae | Ba |
| Damrongia | Damrong Rajanubhab (1862–1943), educator | Gesneriaceae | Bu |
| Dandya | James Edgar Dandy (1903–1976) | Asparagaceae | Qu |
| Danhatchia | Edwin Daniel Hatch (1919–2008), New Zealand botanist; specialist in native orchids | Orchidaceae | Bu |
| Daniellia | William Freeman Daniell (1818–1865) | Fabaceae | Qu |
| Dansiea | Samuel Justin Dansie (1927–2012), Australian forester and plant collector | Combretaceae | Qu |
| Danthonia | Etienne Danthoine (1739–1794), French botanist and agronomist from Manosque; specialist in grasses and herbs | Poaceae | Ba |
| Danthoniastrum | Etienne Danthoine (1739–1794), French botanist and agronomist from Manosque; specialist in grasses and herbs | Poaceae | Qu |
| Danthonidium | Etienne Danthoine (1739–1794), French botanist and agronomist from Manosque; specialist in grasses and herbs | Poaceae | Qu |
| Danthoniopsis | Etienne Danthoine (1739–1794), French botanist and agronomist from Manosque; specialist in grasses and herbs | Poaceae | Qu |
| Daprainia | David Prain (1857–1944) | Fabaceae | Bt |
| Darcya | William Gerald D'Arcy (1931–1999), Canadian-born American botanist at the Missouri Botanical Garden | Plantaginaceae | Bu |
| Darcyanthus | William Gerald D'Arcy (1931–1999), Canadian-born American botanist at the Missouri Botanical Garden | Solanaceae | Bu |
| Darlingia | Charles Henry Darling (1809–1870), colonial administrator | Proteaceae | Qu |
| Darlingtonia | William Darlington (1782–1863) | Sarraceniaceae | St |
| Darmera | Karl Darmer (1843–1918), German botanist | Saxifragaceae | Co |
| Darwinia | Erasmus Darwin (1731–1802) | Myrtaceae | St |
| Daubenya | Charles Daubeny (1795–1867) | Asparagaceae | Qu |
| Daustinia | Daniel Frank Austin (1943–2015), American botanist from the University of Arizona | Convolvulaceae | Bt |
| Daveaua | Jules Alexandre Daveau (1852–1929) | Asteraceae | Bu |
| Davidia | Armand David (1826–1900) | Nyssaceae | Co |
| Davidsea | Gerrit Davidse (b. 1940), Dutch-born American botanist; professor at Washington University in St. Louis and curator at the Missouri Botanical Garden | Poaceae | Bu |
| Davidsonia | John Ewen Davidson (1841–1923) | Cunoniaceae | Qu |
| Daviesia | Hugh Davies (c. 1793 – 1821) | Fabaceae | St |
| Davilla | Pedro Franco Dávila (1711–1786), Peruvian and Spanish naturalist and collector | Dilleniaceae | Bu |
| Davilanthus | Patricia Dávila Aranda (b.1955), Mexican botanist and specialist of the flora of the Tehuacán | Asteraceae | Bt |
| Dayia | Alva Day Grant (1920–2014), American botanist and professor at the University of Texas at Austin | Polemoniaceae | Bu |
| Deamia | Charles C. Deam (1865–1953) | Cactaceae | Qu |
| Debregeasia | Prosper Justin de Brégeas (b. 1807), French captain of the La Bonite expedition | Urticaceae | St |
| Decaisnea | Joseph Decaisne (1807–1882) | Lardizabalaceae | Co |
| Decaisnina | Joseph Decaisne (1807–1882) | Loranthaceae | Qu |
| Decarya | Raymond Decary (1891–1973), French botanist, ethnologist and colonial administrator who conducted research in Madagascar and collected for the National Museum of Natural History | Didiereaceae | Ba |
| Decarydendron | Raymond Decary (1891–1973), French botanist, ethnologist and colonial administrator who conducted research in Madagascar and collected for the National Museum of Natural History | Monimiaceae | Qu |
| Decaryella | Raymond Decary (1891–1973), French botanist, ethnologist and colonial administrator who conducted research in Madagascar and collected for the National Museum of Natural History | Poaceae | Qu |
| Decaryochloa | Raymond Decary (1891–1973), French botanist, ethnologist and colonial administrator who conducted research in Madagascar and collected for the National Museum of Natural History | Poaceae | Qu |
| Decazesia | Louis, duc Decazes (1819–1886) | Asteraceae | Qu |
| Deckenia | Karl Klaus von der Decken (1833–1865) | Arecaceae | Qu |
| Declieuxia | Gabriel de Clieu (1687–1774) | Rubiaceae | Bu |
| Decorsea | Gaston-Jules Decorse (1873–1907), French military doctor and botanist | Fabaceae | Bu |
| Decorsella | Gaston-Jules Decorse (1873–1907), French military doctor and botanist | Violaceae | Bu |
| Dedeckera | Mary DeDecker (1909–2000) | Polygonaceae | Qu |
| Deeringia | George Charles Deering (c. 1695 – 1749) | Amaranthaceae | St |
| Deeringothamnus | Charles Deering (1852–1927), agricultural industrialist, patron | Annonaceae | Bu |
| Degeneria | Otto Degener (1899–1988) | Degeneriaceae | Bu |
| Degenia | Árpád von Degen (1866–1934) | Brassicaceae | Qu |
| Degranvillea | Jean-Jacques de Granville (b. 1943), French director of the herbarium in Cayenne in French Guiana | Orchidaceae | Bu |
| Dehaasia | Dirk de Haas (d. 1702), Governor of Ambon (1687–1691) | Lauraceae | Qu |
| Deherainia | Pierre Paul Dehérain (1830–1902) | Primulaceae | Qu |
| Deinbollia | Peter Vogelius Deinboll (1783–1874) | Sapindaceae | Qu |
| Delairea | Eugène Delaire (1810–1856), French botanist and head gardener at the botanical gardens in Orléans | Asteraceae | Bu |
| Delamerea | Hugh Cholmondeley, 3rd Baron Delamere (1870–1931) | Asteraceae | Bu |
| Delarbrea | Jules Charles Auguste Delarbre (1821–1903), French colonial administrator | Myodocarpaceae | Bu |
| Delavaya | Père Jean Marie Delavay (1834–1895) | Sapindaceae | Qu |
| Delilia | Alire Raffeneau Delile (1778–1850) | Asteraceae | Qu |
| Delissea | Jacques Delisse (1773–1856) | Campanulaceae | Qu |
| Delpinophytum | Federico Delpino (1833–1905) | Brassicaceae | Qu |
| Delwiensia | Delbert Wiens (b. 1932), American plant taxonomist; worked at the University of Dar es Salaam and University of Nairobi | Asteraceae | Bu |
| Demosthenesia | Demosthenes (384–322 BC), politician | Ericaceae | Bu |
| Dendrobangia | Miguel Bang (1853–1895), Danish gardener at Kew Gardens | Metteniusaceae | Bu |
| Dendrocousinsia | Herbert Henry Cousins (1869–1949), British agricultural chemist; director of agriculture in Jamaica | Euphorbiaceae | Bu |
| Dendrokingstonia | John Filmore Kingston (1795–1860), English botanist; wrote about the flora of Devon in 1829 | Annonaceae | Bu |
| Dendroviguiera | Louis Guillaume Alexandre Viguier (1790–1867), French doctor and botanist | Asteraceae | Bt |
| Denekia | Carl Heinrich Deneke (1735–1803), Swedish doctor and botanist | Asteraceae | Bu |
| Denhamia | Dixon Denham (1786–1828), colonial administrator | Celastraceae | Qu |
| Denisophytum | Marcel Denis (1897–1929), French botanist, from Clermont-Ferrand | Fabaceae | Bt |
| Deplanchea | Émile Deplanche (1824–1874) | Bignoniaceae | Qu |
| Deppea | Ferdinand Deppe (1794–1861) | Rubiaceae | Bu |
| Deprea | Alexandre-Armand Desprez (1747–1829), French doctor and botanist | Solanaceae | Bu |
| Desbordesia | Gustave Borgnis-Desbordes (1839–1900), military officer | Irvingiaceae | Qu |
| Deschampsia | Louis Auguste Deschamps (1765–1842) | Poaceae | Co |
| Descurainia | François Descourain (1658–1740), French pharmacist | Brassicaceae | St |
| Desfontainia | René Louiche Desfontaines (1750–1833) | Columelliaceae | Co |
| Desmazeria | John Baptiste Henri Joseph Desmazières (1786–1862) | Poaceae | Qu |
| Desplatsia | Desplats, possibly Victor Desplats (1819–1888) | Malvaceae | Bu |
| Deuterocohnia | Ferdinand Cohn (1828–1898) | Bromeliaceae | Ba |
| Deutzia | Jean Deutz (1743–1784), Dutch merchant and lawyer, patron of Carl Peter Thunberg | Hydrangeaceae | Co |
| Deutzianthus | Jean Deutz (1743–1784), Dutch merchant and lawyer, patron of Carl Peter Thunberg | Euphorbiaceae | Bu |
| Devia | Miriam Phoebe de Vos (1912–2005) | Iridaceae | Bu |
| Devogelia | Eduard Ferdinand de Vogel (b. 1942), Dutch botanist at the national herbarium at Leiden University | Orchidaceae | Bu |
| Dewevrea | Alfred Dewèvre (1866–1897), Belgian pharmacist and mycologist | Fabaceae | Bu |
| Dewevrella | Alfred Dewèvre (1866–1897), Belgian pharmacist and mycologist | Apocynaceae | Bu |
| Dewildemania | Émile Auguste Joseph De Wildeman (1866–1947) | Asteraceae | Qu |
| Dewinteria | Bernard de Winter (b. 1924) | Pedaliaceae | Bu |
| Diabelia | Clarke Abel (1789–1826), surgeon and naturalist | Caprifoliaceae | Bt |
| Dickasonia | Frederick Garrett Dickason (1904–1990), American clergyman and botanist | Orchidaceae | Qu |
| Dickinsia | Frederick Dickins (1838–1915), British scholar and amateur botanist | Apiaceae | Bu |
| Didelotia | Octave François Charles Didelot (1812–1886), French admiral | Fabaceae | Bu |
| Didierea | Alfred Grandidier (1836–1921) | Didiereaceae | Ba |
| Dieffenbachia | Joseph Dieffenbach (1790–1863), head gardener of the Imperial Gardens at Schönbrunn Palace in Vienna | Araceae | Co |
| Diegodendron | Diego Suárez 16th-century, Portuguese navigator and explorer | Bixaceae | Bt |
| Dielitzia | Ludwig Diels (1874–1945) and Ernst Georg Pritzel (1875–1946) | Asteraceae | Bu |
| Dielsantha | Ludwig Diels (1874–1945) | Campanulaceae | Qu |
| Dielsia | Ludwig Diels (1874–1945) | Restionaceae | Qu |
| Dielsiocharis | Ludwig Diels (1874–1945) | Brassicaceae | Qu |
| Dielsiodoxa | Ludwig Diels (1874–1945) | Ericaceae | Bt |
| Dielsiothamnus | Ludwig Diels (1874–1945) | Annonaceae | Qu |
| Diervilla | N. Diereville (b. 1670) | Caprifoliaceae | Co |
| Dilkea | Wentworth Dilke, 1st Baronet (1810–1869) | Passifloraceae | Bu |
| Dillandia | Michael O. Dillon (b. 1947) | Asteraceae | Bu |
| Dillenia | Johann Jacob Dillenius (1684–1747) | Dilleniaceae | Ch |
| Dillwynia | Lewis Weston Dillwyn (1778–1855) | Fabaceae | St |
| Dinizia | José Antonio Picanço Diniz (1870–1934), lawyer and amateur entomologist; friend of Adolpho Ducke, the author of the genus | Fabaceae | Bu |
| Dinklageella | Max Julius Dinklage (1864–1935), German merchant who collected plants in West Africa | Orchidaceae | Qu |
| Dinklageodoxa | Max Julius Dinklage (1864–1935), German merchant who collected plants in West Africa | Bignoniaceae | Qu |
| Dintera | Kurt Dinter (1868–1945) | Plantaginaceae | Qu |
| Dinteracanthus | Kurt Dinter (1868–1945) | Acanthaceae | Qu |
| Dinteranthus | Kurt Dinter (1868–1945) | Aizoaceae | St |
| Dioclea | Diocles of Carystus (c. 375 BC – c. 295 BC) | Fabaceae | Qu |
| Diogenesia | Diogenes (c. 410 BC – c. 320 BC), philosopher, or Diogenes Laërtius (3rd century), biographer | Ericaceae | Bu |
| Diogoa | Diogo Cão (c. 1450 – c. 1486), Portuguese explorer | Olacaceae | Qu |
| Dioscorea | Pedanius Dioscorides (c. 40 – c. 90) | Dioscoreaceae | Ch |
| Dioscoreophyllum | Pedanius Dioscorides (c. 40 – c. 90) | Menispermaceae | Bu |
| Dirichletia | Peter Gustav Lejeune Dirichlet (1805–1859), mathematician | Rubiaceae | Bu |
| Dittrichia | Manfred Dittrich (born 1934), German botanist and previous director of the herbarium at the Botanical Garden in Berlin. | Asteraceae | Bt |
| Dodartia | Denis Dodart (1634–1707) | Mazaceae | Qu |
| Dodonaea | Rembert Dodoens (1517–1585) | Sapindaceae | Co |
| Doellingeria | Ignaz Döllinger (1770–1841) | Asteraceae | Ba |
| Doerpfeldia | Wilhelm Dörpfeld (1853–1940), archeologist | Rhamnaceae | Bu |
| Dolomiaea | Déodat Gratet de Dolomieu (1750–1801) | Asteraceae | Qu |
| Dombeya | Joseph Dombey (1742–1794) | Malvaceae | St |
| Domeykoa | Ignacy Domeyko (1802–1889) | Apiaceae | Qu |
| Donatia | Vitaliano Donati (1717–1762) | Stylidiaceae | Qu |
| Donella | George Don (1798–1856) | Sapotaceae | Bu |
| Doniophyton | David Don (1799–1841) | Asteraceae | Bu |
| Donnellsmithia | John Donnell Smith (1829–1928) | Apiaceae | Qu |
| Donnellyanthus | John Donnell Smith (1829–1928), biologist, and Nelly Diego Pérez (fl. 2001), director of a botanical lab at the National Autonomous University of Mexico | Rubiaceae | Bu |
| Dorstenia | Theodor Dorsten (1492–1552) | Moraceae | St |
| Dossinia | Pierre-Etienne Dossin (1777–1852), Belgian botanist from Liège | Orchidaceae | Qu |
| Douepea | Herman van Donep, government secretary in Kochi | Brassicaceae | Bu |
| Downingia | Andrew Jackson Downing (1815–1852) | Campanulaceae | St |
| Doyerea | Louis Michel François Doyère (1811–1863) | Cucurbitaceae | Bu |
| Doyleanthus | James A. Doyle (b. 1943), American botanist and paleontologist at the University of California, Davis | Myristicaceae | Bu |
| Drakaea | Sarah Drake (1803–1857) | Orchidaceae | Qu |
| Dransfieldia | John Dransfield (b. 1945) | Arecaceae | Bu |
| Draperia | John William Draper (1811–1882), scientist | Boraginaceae | Qu |
| Dregea (syn. of Stephanotis) | Johann Franz Drège (1794–1881) | Apocynaceae | Ba |
| Dregeochloa | Johann Franz Drège (1794–1881) | Poaceae | Bu |
| Dresslerella | Robert Louis Dressler (b. 1927) | Orchidaceae | Qu |
| Dressleria | Robert Louis Dressler (b. 1927) | Orchidaceae | Qu |
| Dresslerothamnus | Robert Louis Dressler (b. 1927) | Asteraceae | Bu |
| Driessenia | Peter van Driessen (1753–1828), Dutch doctor, pharmacist, chemist and botanist | Melastomataceae | Bu |
| Droguetia | Marc Julien Droguet (1769–1836), French naval doctor | Urticaceae | Bu |
| Droogmansia | Frans André Hubert Droogmans (1858–1938), Belgian politician | Fabaceae | Bu |
| Drummondita | Thomas Drummond (1780–1835) and his brother James Drummond (1787–1863) | Rutaceae | Qu |
| Drusa | André Pierre Ledru (1761–1825), French clergyman and botanist | Apiaceae | Bu |
| Dubautia | Joseph Eugène Dubaut (1796–1832), French naval officer | Asteraceae | Qu |
| Duboisia | Charles Dubois (1656–1740) | Solanaceae | St |
| Dubouzetia | Eugène du Bouzet (1805–1867), French counter-admiral and governor of New Caledonia | Elaeocarpaceae | Qu |
| Dubyaea | Jean Étienne Duby (1798–1885) | Asteraceae | Bu |
| Duckea | Adolpho Ducke (1876–1959) | Rapateaceae | Qu |
| Duckeanthus | Adolpho Ducke (1876–1959) | Annonaceae | Qu |
| Duckeella | Adolpho Ducke (1876–1959) | Orchidaceae | Qu |
| Duckeodendron | Adolpho Ducke (1876–1959) | Solanaceae | Qu |
| Duckesia | Adolpho Ducke (1876–1959) | Humiriaceae | Qu |
| Ducrosia | François-Barthélémy Ducros (1751–1822), Swiss clergyman, botanist in Nyon | Apiaceae | Bu |
| Dudleya | William Russel Dudley (1849–1911) | Crassulaceae | St |
| Dugesia | Alfredo Dugès (1826–1910) | Asteraceae | Qu |
| Duguetia | Jacques Joseph Duguet (1649–1733), French clergyman and professor of theology | Annonaceae | Bu |
| Duhaldea | Jean-Baptiste Du Halde (1674–1743), historian | Asteraceae | Bu |
| Dumasia | Jean-Baptiste Dumas (1800–1884), chemist | Fabaceae | Qu |
| Dunalia | Michel Félix Dunal (1789–1856) | Solanaceae | Qu |
| Dunbaria | George Dunbar (d. 1851), classicist | Fabaceae | Qu |
| Dunnia | Stephen Troyte Dunn (1868–1938) | Rubiaceae | Qu |
| Dunstervillea | Galfrid C. K. Dunsterville (1905–1988), English engineer, specialist in orchids | Orchidaceae | Qu |
| Duparquetia | Charles Duparquet (1830–1888), French clergyman, naturalist and plant collector | Fabaceae | Bu |
| Duperrea | Louis Isidore Duperrey (1786–1865), explorer | Rubiaceae | Bu |
| Duperreya | Louis Isidore Duperrey (1786–1865), explorer | Convolvulaceae | Qu |
| Dupineta | Antoine du Pinet (1515–1584), French writer in Lyon | Melastomataceae | Qu |
| Dupontia | J. D. Dupont, Parisian who wrote about Atriplex | Poaceae | Bu |
| Dupontiopsis | J. D. Dupont, Parisian who wrote about Atriplex | Poaceae | Bt |
| Dupuya | David J. Du Puy (b. 1958), English botanist, specialist in the plants of Madagascar | Fabaceae | Bu |
| Duranta | Castore Durante (c. 1529 – 1590) | Verbenaceae | St |
| Duroia | Johann Philipp Du Roi (1741–1785), German dendrologist and doctor in Helmstedt and Braunschweig | Rubiaceae | Qu |
| Durringtonia | Lorraine Rosebeth Durrington Tan (b. 1948), Australian botanist in Queensland; later a doctor | Rubiaceae | Bu |
| Duseniella | Per Karl Hjalmar Dusén (1855–1926) | Asteraceae | Qu |
| Dussia | Antoine Duss (1840–1924) | Fabaceae | Qu |
| Dutailliopsis | Gustave Dutailly (1846–1906) | Rutaceae | Bu |
| Dutaillyea | Gustave Dutailly (1846–1906) | Rutaceae | Bu |
| Duthiastrum | Augusta Vera Duthie (1881–1963) | Iridaceae | Bu |
| Duthiea | John Firminger Duthie (1845–1922) | Poaceae | Bu |
| Duvalia | Henri Auguste Duval (1777–1814), French doctor and botanist with a focus on succulents | Apocynaceae | St |
| Duvaliandra | Henri Auguste Duval (1777–1814), French doctor and botanist with a focus on succulents | Apocynaceae | Qu |
| Dyckia | Joseph zu Salm-Reifferscheidt-Dyck (1773–1861) | Bromeliaceae | St |
| Dyera | William Turner Thiselton-Dyer (1843–1928) | Apocynaceae | Qu |
| Dymondia | Margaret Elizabeth Dryden-Dymond (1909–1952), South African gardener at Kirstenbosch National Botanical Garden | Asteraceae | Bu |
| Eastwoodia | Alice Eastwood (1859–1953) | Asteraceae | Qu |
| Eatonella | Daniel Cady Eaton (1834–1895) | Asteraceae | Qu |
| Eberhardtia | Philippe Eberhardt (1874–1942), French professor of botany in Besançon | Sapotaceae | Bu |
| Eberlanzia | Friedrich Eberlanz, amateur naturalist of Lüderitz Bay in Namibia | Aizoaceae | St |
| Echeandia | Pedro Gregorio Echeandía y Jiménez (1746–1817), Spanish botanist and apothecary in Pamplona and Zaragoza | Asparagaceae | Qu |
| Echeveria | Atanasio Echeverría y Godoy (b. c. 1771) | Crassulaceae | Co |
| Edgeworthia | Michael Pakenham Edgeworth (1812–1881) and Maria Edgeworth (1768–1849), writer | Thymelaeaceae | Co |
| Edithcolea | Edith Cole (1859–1940), who collected plants in the 1890s in the Horn of Africa (Note: Present-day geographical names are used wherever possible.) | Apocynaceae | St |
| Edmondia | Pierre Edmond Boissier (1810–1885) | Asteraceae | Bu |
| Edmundoa | Edmundo Pereira (1914–1986), Brazilian botanist from the Botanical Garden in Rio de Janeiro | Bromeliaceae | Bt |
| Eduandrea | Édouard André (1840–1911) | Bromeliaceae | Bu |
| Eggelingia | William Julius Eggeling (1909–1994) | Orchidaceae | Qu |
| Ehrendorferia | Friedrich Ehrendorfer (b. 1927), Austrian professor of botany in Graz and Vienna; director of the botanical garden in Vienna | Papaveraceae | Bu |
| Ehretia | Georg Dionysius Ehret (1708–1770) | Boraginaceae | St |
| Ehrharta | Jakob Friedrich Ehrhart (1742–1795) | Poaceae | Qu |
| Eigia | Alexander Eig (1894–1938) | Brassicaceae | Bu |
| Eitenia | Liene Teixeira Eiten (1925–1979), Brazilian botanist, and her husband George Eiten (1923–2012), American-born Brazilian botanist at the University of Brasília | Asteraceae | Bu |
| Eizia | Eizi Matuda (1894–1978) | Rubiaceae | Bu |
| Ekebergia | Carl Gustaf Ekeberg (1716–1784) | Meliaceae | Qu |
| Ekmania | Erik Leonard Ekman (1883–1931) | Asteraceae | Qu |
| Ekmanianthe | Erik Leonard Ekman (1883–1931) | Bignoniaceae | Qu |
| Ekmaniopappus | Erik Leonard Ekman (1883–1931) | Asteraceae | Bu |
| Ekmanochloa | Erik Leonard Ekman (1883–1931) | Poaceae | Qu |
| Elekmania | Erik Leonard Ekman (1883–1931) | Asteraceae | Bu |
| Eliea | Jean-Baptiste Élie de Beaumont (1798–1874) | Hypericaceae | Bu |
| Ellenbergia | Heinz Ellenberg (1913–1997) | Asteraceae | Bu |
| Elliottia | Stephen Elliott (1771–1830) | Ericaceae | St |
| Ellisia | John Ellis (1710–1776) | Boraginaceae | Qu |
| Ellisiophyllum | John Ellis (1710–1776) | Plantaginaceae | Qu |
| Ellisochloa | Roger Pearson Ellis (b. 1944), South African botanist in Pretoria; specialist in grasses | Poaceae | Bu |
| Elmera | Adolph Daniel Edward Elmer (1870–1942) | Saxifragaceae | Qu |
| Eloyella | Juan Eloy Valenzuela y Mantilla (1756–1834), Colombian clergyman and botanist | Orchidaceae | Qu |
| Elsholtzia | Johann Sigismund Elsholtz (1623–1688) | Lamiaceae | St |
| Elvasia | Francisco Manoel de Elvas, Portuguese writer of a history of Brazil | Ochnaceae | Bu |
| Emarhendia | M. R. Henderson (1899–1982) | Gesneriaceae | Bu |
| Emblingia | Thomas Embling (1814–1893), doctor | Emblingiaceae | Qu |
| Embreea | Alvin Goodale Embree (1925–2001), American orchid enthusiast | Orchidaceae | Qu |
| Emiliella | Émilie du Châtelet (1706–1749), natural philosopher | Asteraceae | Bu |
| Eminia | Emin Pasha (1840–1892) | Fabaceae | Bu |
| Eminium | Emin Pasha (1840–1892) | Araceae | Bu |
| Enceliopsis | Christoph Entzelt (1517–1583), German clergyman and chronicler | Asteraceae | Bu |
| Endertia | Frederik Endert (1891–1953) | Fabaceae | Bu |
| Endlicheria | Stephan Endlicher (1804–1849) | Lauraceae | Qu |
| Endressia | Philipp Anton Christoph Endress (1806–1831), German botanist and plant collector | Apiaceae | Qu |
| Engelhardia | Nicolaus Engelhard (1761–1831), Dutch merchant and colonial administrator | Juglandaceae | Qu |
| Engelmannia | George Engelmann (1809–1884) | Asteraceae | Qu |
| Englerarum | Adolf Engler (1844–1930) | Araceae | Bu |
| Engleria | Adolf Engler (1844–1930) | Asteraceae | Qu |
| Englerina | Adolf Engler (1844–1930) | Loranthaceae | Qu |
| Englerocharis | Adolf Engler (1844–1930) | Brassicaceae | Qu |
| Englerodaphne | Adolf Engler (1844–1930) | Thymelaeaceae | Qu |
| Englerodendron | Adolf Engler (1844–1930) | Fabaceae | Qu |
| Englerophytum | Adolf Engler (1844–1930) | Sapotaceae | Qu |
| Enriquebeltrania | Enrique Beltrán (1903–1994) | Euphorbiaceae | Qu |
| Eokochia | Wilhelm Daniel Joseph Koch (1771–1849) | Amaranthaceae | Bu |
| Eplingiella | Carl Epling (1894–1968) | Lamiaceae | Bu |
| Erblichia | Ch. Erblich, German court garden-master in Hannover | Passifloraceae | Bu |
| Ercilla | Alonso de Ercilla (1533–1595) | Phytolaccaceae | St |
| Erichsenia | Frederick Ole Erichsen (1869–1917), engineer with Goldfields Water Supply Scheme in Australia | Fabaceae | Qu |
| Ernestia | Ernst Heinrich Friedrich Meyer (1791–1858) | Melastomataceae | Qu |
| Errazurizia | Federico Errázuriz Zañartu (1825–1877), president | Fabaceae | Bu |
| Ertela | Johann Gottlob Hertel (b. 1709), German scholar who wrote a dissertation in Leipzig on plant respiration | Rutaceae | Bu |
| Escallonia | Antonio José Escallón y Flórez (1739–1819), Spanish official and plant-hunter in South America | Escalloniaceae | Ch |
| Eschenbachia | Johann Friedrich Eschenbach (b. 1757), German doctor and botanist in Leipzig | Asteraceae | Bu |
| Eschscholzia | Johann Friedrich von Eschscholtz (1793–1831) | Papaveraceae | Co |
| Eschweilera | Franz Gerhard Eschweiler (1796–1831), German doctor, lichenologist and mycologist | Lecythidaceae | Qu |
| Escobaria | Rómulo Escobar Zerman (1872–1946) and his brother Numa Pompilio Escobar Zerman (1874–1949) | Cactaceae | Ba |
| Escobedia | Jorge Escobedo y Alarcón (1743–1805), Spanish lawyer and colonial administrator in Peru | Orobanchaceae | Bu |
| Escontria | Blas Escontría y Bustamante (1847–1906), Mexican politician and engineer | Cactaceae | St |
| Esenbeckia | Christian Gottfried Daniel Nees von Esenbeck (1776–1858) | Rutaceae | Qu |
| Espadaea | Juan José Díaz de Espada (1757–1832), Spanish bishop in Havana, Cuba | Solanaceae | Bu |
| Espejoa | Antonio de Espejo (c. 1540 – 1585) | Asteraceae | Bu |
| Espeletia | José Manuel de Ezpeleta, 1st Count of Ezpeleta de Beire (1739–1823) | Asteraceae | Bu |
| Espostoa | Nicolas E. Esposto (1877–1942), Peruvian botanist and doctor who taught at the agricultural school in Lima | Cactaceae | St |
| Espostoopsis | Nicolas E. Esposto (1877–1942), Peruvian botanist and doctor who taught at the agricultural school in Lima | Cactaceae | Qu |
| Esterhazya | Nikolaus II, Prince Esterházy (1765–1833) | Orobanchaceae | Bu |
| Esterhuysenia | Elsie Elizabeth Esterhuysen (1912–2006) | Aizoaceae | Qu |
| Etlingera | Andreas Ernst Etlinger (1756–1785), German botanist and doctor in Kulmbach | Zingiberaceae | Ba |
| Eudema | Eudemus of Rhodes (c. 370 BC – c. 300 BC), historian | Brassicaceae | Bu |
| Eugenia | Prince Eugene of Savoy (1663–1736) | Myrtaceae | St |
| Eulalia | Eulalie Delile (1796–1883), French botanical illustrator. Wife of Alire Raffeneau Delile and later of Jacques Cambessèdes | Poaceae | Qu |
| Eulaliopsis | Eulalie Delile (1796–1883), French botanical illustrator. Wife of Alire Raffeneau Delile and later of Jacques Cambessèdes | Poaceae | Qu |
| Eumachia | Eumachus, Greek herbalist mentioned by Theophrastus | Rubiaceae | Bu |
| Eupatorium | Mithridates VI Eupator (132–63 BC) | Asteraceae | Qu |
| Eupatoriastrum | Mithridates VI Eupator (132–63 BC) | Asteraceae | B2 |
| Eupatorina | Mithridates VI Eupator (132–63 BC) | Asteraceae | Qu |
| Eupatoriopsis | Mithridates VI Eupator (132–63 BC) | Asteraceae | Qu |
| Euphronia | Euphronis, ancient writer on cultivation | Euphroniaceae | Bu |
| Everardia | Everard im Thurn (1852–1932) | Cyperaceae | Qu |
| Everistia | Selwyn Lawrence Everist (1913–1981), Australian botanist at the Queensland herbarium | Rubiaceae | Bu |
| Eversmannia | Eduard Friedrich Eversmann (1794–1860) | Fabaceae | Qu |
| Ewartia | Alfred James Ewart (1872–1937) | Asteraceae | Qu |
| Ewartiothamnus | Alfred James Ewart (1872–1937) | Asteraceae | Qu |
| Exbucklandia | William Buckland (1784–1856) | Hamamelidaceae | Qu |
| Exellodendron | Arthur Wallis Exell (1901–1993) | Chrysobalanaceae | Qu |
| Eysenhardtia | Carl Wilhelm Eysenhardt (1794–1825), German doctor and naturalist; later a professor of botany in Königsberg | Fabaceae | Qu |
| Faberia | Ernst Faber (1839–1899), German clergyman, sinologist and naturalist | Asteraceae | Bu |
| Fabiana | Francisco Fabián y Fuero (1719–1801), clergyman; founded a botanical garden | Solanaceae | Co |
| Facchinia | Francesco Angelo Facchini (1788–1852) | Caryophyllaceae | Bu |
| Fadenia | Robert Bruce Faden (b. 1942), American botanist at the Smithsonian Institution | Amaranthaceae | Qu |
| Fagraea | Jonas Theodor Fagraeus (1729–1797), Swedish botanist and doctor in Gothenburg | Gentianaceae | Qu |
| Faguetia | Auguste Faguet (1841–1886) | Anacardiaceae | Bu |
| Faidherbia | Louis Faidherbe (1818–1889), army general | Fabaceae | Bu |
| Falconeria | Hugh Falconer (1808–1865) | Euphorbiaceae | Qu |
| Falkia | Johan Peter Falk (1732–1774) | Convolvulaceae | Qu |
| Fallopia | Gabriele Falloppio (1523–1562), professor of anatomy and pharmacy | Polygonaceae | Co |
| Fallugia | Virgilio Fallugi (1625–1707), Italian botanist | Rosaceae | St |
| Fanninia | George Fox Fannin (1832–1865), Irish botanist and plant collector in Natal in South Africa | Apocynaceae | Qu |
| Fargesia | Paul Guillaume Farges (1844–1912) | Poaceae | Ba |
| Farmeria | William Francis Gamul Farmer (1811–1860), English high sheriff in Surrey; orchid enthusiast | Podostemaceae | Bu |
| Faroa | João Cabral Pereira Lapa e Faro (c. 1820 – c. 1896), Portuguese doctor in western southern Africa | Gentianaceae | Bu |
| Farquharia | John Henry Joseph Farquhar (1879–1972), forester and plant collector in Nigeria | Apocynaceae | Qu |
| Farsetia | Filippo Farsetti (1703–1774), patron of botany and the arts | Brassicaceae | Bu |
| Fatoua | Jean Baptiste Ambroise Fatou (1786–1858), French naval apothecary | Moraceae | Bu |
| Faucherea | Ètienne Aimé Fauchère (1876–1950), French colonial administrator and general inspector in the agricultural service in Madagascar | Sapotaceae | Bu |
| Faujasia | Barthélemy Faujas de Saint-Fond (1741–1819) | Asteraceae | Qu |
| Faujasiopsis | Barthélemy Faujas de Saint-Fond (1741–1819) | Asteraceae | Qu |
| Faurea | William Caldwell Faure (1822–1844), South African soldier and botanist | Proteaceae | Qu |
| Favratia | Louis Favrat (1827–1893), Swiss teacher and botanist, conservator at the botanical museum in Lausanne | Campanulaceae | Bu |
| Faxonia | Charles Edward Faxon (1846–1918) | Asteraceae | Bu |
| Feddea | Friedrich Karl Georg Fedde (1873–1942) | Asteraceae | Bu |
| Feeria | Heinrich Feer (1857–1892), Swiss botanist in Geneva, and Carl Feer-Herzog (1820–1880), politician | Campanulaceae | Qu |
| Feijoa | João da Silva Feijó (1760–1824) | Myrtaceae | Qu |
| Feldstonia | Carl Hansen Ostenfeld (1873–1931) | Asteraceae | Bu |
| Feliciadamia | Henri Jacques-Félix (1907–2008), French naturalist at the National Museum of Natural History, and Jaques-George Adam (1909–1980), French botanist and plant collector in France and Africa | Melastomataceae | Qu |
| Fendlera | Augustus Fendler (1813–1883) | Hydrangeaceae | St |
| Fendlerella | Augustus Fendler (1813–1883) | Hydrangeaceae | Qu |
| Fenixia | Eugenio Fenix (1883–1939), forester; collected in the Philippines for the Arnold Arboretum at Harvard University | Asteraceae | Bu |
| Ferdinandusa | Ferdinand I of Austria (1793–1875) | Rubiaceae | Bu |
| Feretia | Pierre Victor Adolphe Ferret (1814–1882), French botanist and researcher with the military | Rubiaceae | Bu |
| Fergusonia | William Ferguson (1820–1887) | Rubiaceae | Qu |
| Fernandezia | Gregorio García Fernández (d. 1798), Spanish professor of medicine in Madrid | Orchidaceae | Qu |
| Fernandoa | Ferdinand II of Portugal (1816–1885) | Bignoniaceae | Bu |
| Fernelia | Jean Fernel (1497–1558), doctor | Rubiaceae | Qu |
| Fernseea | Heinrich Wawra von Fernsee (1831–1881) | Bromeliaceae | Bu |
| Ferraria | Giovanni Baptista Ferrari (1584–1655) | Iridaceae | St |
| Ferreyranthus | Ramón Ferreyra (1910–2005), Peruvian botanist; curator of the herbarium and professor of natural history in Lima | Asteraceae | Qu |
| Ferreyrella | Ramón Ferreyra (1910–2005), Peruvian botanist; curator of the herbarium and professor of natural history in Lima | Asteraceae | Qu |
| Fessia | Bernhard Heindl (b. 1947), Austrian philosopher, anthropologist, psychologist, writer and agricultural scientist | Asparagaceae | Bu |
| Fevillea | Louis Feuillée (1660–1732) | Cucurbitaceae | Qu |
| Fibigia | Johann Fibig (1758–1792), German doctor and naturalist; professor in Mainz; built up the botanical garden there | Brassicaceae | Qu |
| Ficalhoa | Francisco Manuel de Melo Breyner, 4th Count of Ficalho (1837–1903) | Sladeniaceae | Bu |
| Ficinia | Heinrich David August Ficinus (1782–1857), German doctor, apothecary, naturalist and professor in Dresden | Cyperaceae | Qu |
| Fiebrigiella | Karl August Gustav Fiebrig (1869–1951) | Fabaceae | Bu |
| Fieldia | Barron Justice Field (1786–1846), English-born Australian lawyer, poet and writer; a judge on the Supreme Court of New South Wales | Gesneriaceae | Qu |
| Filetia | Gerrit Jan Filet (1825–1891), Dutch military doctor | Acanthaceae | Qu |
| Filgueirasia | Tarciso S. Filgueiras (b. 1950), Brazilian botanist; specialist in grasses | Poaceae | Bu |
| Fillaeopsis | Edmé Jean Filleau de Saint-Hilaire (1779–1845), French economist, journalist and colonial administrator | Fabaceae | Bu |
| Fingerhuthia | Carl Anton Fingerhuth (c. 1800 – 1876), German doctor and mycologist | Poaceae | Qu |
| Finlaysonia | George Finlayson (1790–1823) | Apocynaceae | Qu |
| Finschia | Otto Finsch (1839–1917) | Proteaceae | Bu |
| Firmiana | Karl Joseph von Firmian (1716–1782), nobleman | Malvaceae | St |
| Fischeria | Friedrich Ernst Ludwig von Fischer (1782–1854) | Apocynaceae | Qu |
| Fitchia | Walter Hood Fitch (1817–1892) | Asteraceae | Qu |
| Fittingia | Hans Fitting (1877–1970) | Primulaceae | Bu |
| Fittonia | Sarah Mary Fitton (c. 1796 – 1874) and her sister Elizabeth Fitton | Acanthaceae | Co |
| Fitzroya | Robert FitzRoy (1805–1865) | Cupressaceae | St |
| Fitzwillia | William Vincent Fitzgerald (1867–1929) | Asteraceae | Bu |
| Flacourtia | Étienne de Flacourt (1607–1660) | Salicaceae | St |
| Fleischmannia | Gottfried Fleischmann (1777–1850), German professor of anatomy in Erlangen | Asteraceae | Qu |
| Fleischmanniopsis | Gottfried Fleischmann (1777–1850), German professor of anatomy in Erlangen | Asteraceae | Qu |
| Flemingia | John Fleming (1747–1829) | Fabaceae | St |
| Fleurydora | Francis Fleury (1882–1919), French plant collector, including in Africa and Asia | Ochnaceae | Qu |
| Flindersia | Matthew Flinders (1774–1814), navigator | Rutaceae | Qu |
| Floerkea | Heinrich Gustav Flörke (1764–1835) | Limnanthaceae | Qu |
| Floscaldasia | Francisco José de Caldas (1768–1816) | Asteraceae | Qu |
| Flosmutisia | José Celestino Mutis (1732–1808) | Asteraceae | Qu |
| Flourensia | Jean Pierre Flourens (1794–1867), doctor | Asteraceae | Bu |
| Floydia | Alexander Floyd (b. 1926) | Proteaceae | Bu |
| Flueggea | Johannes Flüggé (1775–1816) | Phyllanthaceae | Qu |
| Flyriella | Lowell David Flyr (1937–1971) | Asteraceae | Bu |
| Fockea | Gustav Woldemar Focke (1810–1877) | Apocynaceae | Qu |
| Foleyola | Henri Foley (1871–1956), French doctor at the Pasteur Institute of Algeria | Brassicaceae | Bu |
| Fonkia | Francisco Fonk (1830–1912), Chilean doctor in Puerto Montt | Plantaginaceae | Bu |
| Fontainea | Constant Aristide Fontaine (1818–1900), French professor of chemistry and toxicology at the school of naval medicine in Toulon | Euphorbiaceae | Bu |
| Fontanesia | René Louiche Desfontaines (1750–1833) | Oleaceae | St |
| Forchhammeria | Johan Georg Forchhammer (1794–1865) | Resedaceae | Qu |
| Fordia | Charles Ford (1844–1927), British botanist who founded the botanical garden in Hong Kong | Fabaceae | Qu |
| Fordiophyton | Charles Ford (1844–1927), British botanist who founded the botanical garden in Hong Kong | Melastomataceae | Bu |
| Forestiera | Robert André Forestier (1742–1812), French doctor | Oleaceae | St |
| Forgesia | Antoine Marie Desforges-Boucher (1715 – c. 1790), French governor in Réunion | Escalloniaceae | Bu |
| Formania | Adam Forman (1876–1976), Scottish clergyman who promoted the use of Sphagnum dressings for wounds in World War I | Asteraceae | Bu |
| Forsskaolea | Peter Forsskål (1732–1763) | Urticaceae | Qu |
| Forstera | Johann Reinhold Forster (1729–1798) and Georg Forster (1754–1794) | Stylidiaceae | Qu |
| Forsteronia | Thomas Furly Forster (1761–1825) | Apocynaceae | Qu |
| Forsythia | William Forsyth (1737–1804) | Oleaceae | Co |
| Fortunearia | Robert Fortune (1812–1880) | Hamamelidaceae | Qu |
| Fortuynia | Fortuyne, unknown person from present-day Jakarta, Indonesia | Brassicaceae | Bu |
| Forzzaea | Rafaela Campostrini Forzza (b.1972), Brazilian botanist and curator of the Herbarium of the Rio de Janeiro Botanical Garden | Bromeliaceae | Bt |
| Fosbergia | Francis Raymond Fosberg (1908–1993) | Rubiaceae | Bu |
| Fosterella | Mulford B. Foster (1888–1978) | Bromeliaceae | Bu |
| Fothergilla | John Fothergill (1712–1780) | Hamamelidaceae | Co |
| Fouquieria | Pierre Fouquier (1776–1850), doctor | Fouquieriaceae | Ch |
| Frailea | Manuel Fraile (1850–1944), gardener with the U.S. Department of Agriculture | Cactaceae | St |
| Franciscodendron | William Douglas Francis (1889–1959) | Malvaceae | Bu |
| Francoa | Francisco Franco (c. 1515 – c. 1569), Spanish doctor | Francoaceae | Ch |
| Frankenia | Johann Francke (1590–1661), Swedish botanist | Frankeniaceae | Ch |
| Franklandia | Thomas Frankland, 6th Baronet (1750–1831) | Proteaceae | Qu |
| Franklinia | Benjamin Franklin (1706–1790), polymath | Theaceae | Co |
| Frasera | John Fraser (1750–1811) | Gentianaceae | St |
| Fraunhofera | Joseph von Fraunhofer (1787–1826), physicist | Celastraceae | Bu |
| Freesia | Friedrich Freese (1795–1876), German botanist | Iridaceae | Co |
| Fremontodendron | John C. Frémont (1813–1890), explorer and politician | Malvaceae | Co |
| Freycinetia | Louis de Freycinet (1779–1842), naval officer and naturalist | Pandanaceae | St |
| Freylinia | Lorenzo Freylino (1754–1820), Italian nobleman and naturalist; maintained a garden with 6000 exotic plants in Buttigliera d'Asti | Scrophulariaceae | Bu |
| Freziera | Amédée-François Frézier (1682–1773) | Pentaphylacaceae | Qu |
| Fridericia | Frederick William III of Prussia (1770–1840) | Bignoniaceae | Bu |
| Friesodielsia | Robert Elias Fries (1876–1966) and Ludwig Diels (1874–1945) | Annonaceae | Bu |
| Frithia | Frank Frith (1872–1954), English and South African gardener with the South African Railways and Harbours Administration; collected succulents in South Africa and Namibia | Aizoaceae | Qu |
| Fritzschia | Carl Julius Fritzsche (1808–1871) | Melastomataceae | Bu |
| Froelichia | Josef Aloys Frölich (1766–1841) | Amaranthaceae | St |
| Froelichiella | Josef Aloys Frölich (1766–1841) | Amaranthaceae | Qu |
| Froesia | Richardo de Lemos Fróes (1891–1960), Brazilian plant collector | Ochnaceae | Bu |
| Froesiochloa | Richardo de Lemos Fróes (1891–1960), Brazilian plant collector | Poaceae | Bu |
| Froesiodendron | Richardo de Lemos Fróes (1891–1960), Brazilian plant collector | Annonaceae | Bu |
| Frolovia | Pjotr Kosmitsch von Frolow (1775–1839), Russian governor in Barnaul; built up a botanical garden with Siberian plants | Asteraceae | Bu |
| Frommia | Paul Ludwig Theodor Johannis Fromm (1864–1940), German military officer, cartographer, naturalist and collector in eastern southern Africa | Apiaceae | Bu |
| Froriepia | Ludwig Friedrich von Froriep (1779–1847), German doctor, professor of medicine and anatomy in Jena and Halle | Apiaceae | Bu |
| Fryxellia | Paul Fryxell (1927–2011) | Malvaceae | Qu |
| Fuchsia | Leonhart Fuchs (1501–1566) | Onagraceae | Co |
| Fuernrohria | August Emanuel Fürnrohr (1804–1861), German botanist and professor at a school in Regensburg | Apiaceae | Qu |
| Fuerstia | Carl Magnus Fürst (1854–1935), Swedish doctor, professor of anatomy and histology at Lund University | Lamiaceae | Bu |
| Fuertesia | Miguel Domingo Fuertes Lorén (1871–1926), Spanish clergyman, plant collector on Hispaniola and Cuba | Loasaceae | Bu |
| Fuertesiella | Miguel Domingo Fuertes Lorén (1871–1926), Spanish clergyman, plant collector on Hispaniola and Cuba | Orchidaceae | Bu |
| Fuertesimalva | Javier Fuertes (b. 1960), Spanish botanist; specialist in Malvaceae | Malvaceae | Bu |
| Fuirena | Joergen Fuiren (1581–1628), Danish doctor and botanist from Copenhagen | Cyperaceae | Qu |
| Fulcaldea | Emmanuel Louis, Vicomte de Foucault (1764-1823), French botanist; wrote on preservation of woodlands | Asteraceae | Bu |
| Funkiella | Nicolas Funck (1816–1896), Luxembourg architect, zoologist, botanist and explorer; director of the zoos in Brussels and Cologne | Orchidaceae | Qu |
| Furcraea | Antoine François, comte de Fourcroy (1755–1809) | Asparagaceae | St |
| Furtadoa | Caetano Xavier dos Remedios Furtado (1897–1980), Indian botanist at the botanical garden in Singapore | Araceae | Qu |
| Gaertnera | Joseph Gaertner (1732–1791) | Rubiaceae | Qu |
| Gagea | Thomas Gage (1761–1820) | Liliaceae | St |
| Gagnebina | Abraham Gagnebin (1707–1800), Swiss military doctor and botanist with a surgical practice near Bern | Fabaceae | Qu |
| Gagnepainia | François Gagnepain (1866–1952) | Zingiberaceae | Qu |
| Gahnia | Henrik Gahn (1747–1816), Swedish naval doctor and botanist; student of Carl Linnaeus | Cyperaceae | Qu |
| Gaillardia | Antoine René Gaillard de Charentonneau (d. 1791), French magistrate and botanist | Asteraceae | Co |
| Gaimardia | Joseph Paul Gaimard (1793–1858) | Restionaceae | Qu |
| Galeana | Hermenegildo Galeana (1762–1814), independence fighter | Asteraceae | Bu |
| Galeottia | Henri Guillaume Galeotti (1814–1858) | Orchidaceae | Qu |
| Galeottiella | Henri Guillaume Galeotti (1814–1858) | Orchidaceae | Qu |
| Galiniera | Joseph Germain Galinier (1814–1888), French military officer, explorer and cartographer | Rubiaceae | Bu |
| Galinsoga | Ignacio Mariano Martinez de Galinsoga (1766–1797) | Asteraceae | Qu |
| Galitzkya | Nikolai Petrovic Ikonnikov-Galitzky (1892–1942) | Brassicaceae | Bu |
| Gallardoa | Ángel Gallardo (1867–1934) | Malpighiaceae | Bu |
| Gallesia | Giorgio Gallesio (1772–1839) | Petiveriaceae | Qu |
| Gallienia | Joseph Gallieni (1849–1916), army general | Rubiaceae | Bu |
| Galopina | Jean-François de Galaup, comte de Lapérouse (1741–1788) | Rubiaceae | Bu |
| Galpinia | Ernest Edward Galpin (1858–1941) | Lythraceae | Qu |
| Galvezia | José de Gálvez, 1st Marquess of Sonora (1720–1787) | Plantaginaceae | Qu |
| Gambelia | William Gambel (1823–1849) | Plantaginaceae | Qu |
| Gambeya | Henri Gambey (1787–1847), French mechanic and entrepreneur who made precision instruments (sextants, compasses, etc.) for many scientists | Sapotaceae | Bu |
| Gamblea | James Sykes Gamble (1847–1925) | Araliaceae | Qu |
| Garberia | Abram Paschal Garber (1838–1881), American doctor and botanist from Pennsylvania who discovered or rediscovered this genus in southern Florida | Asteraceae | Bu |
| Garcia | Basilio Garcia Perez Caballero, paymaster for the Spanish king in Santa Marta in present-day Colombia | Euphorbiaceae | Bu |
| Garciadelia | Ricardo Guarionex García (b. 1960), Dominican professor of botany at the Universidad Autónoma de Santo Domingo and director of the botanical garden | Euphorbiaceae | Bu |
| Garcibarrigoa | Hernando García-Barriga (1913–2005), Colombian professor at the National University of Colombia in Bogotá; founded the botanical garden there | Asteraceae | Bu |
| Garcinia | Laurent Garcin (1683–1751), French botanist and fellow of the Royal Society | Clusiaceae | St |
| Gardenia | Alexander Garden (1730–1791) | Rubiaceae | Co |
| Gardeniopsis | Alexander Garden (1730–1791) | Rubiaceae | Qu |
| Gardneria | Edward Gardner (1784–1861), English colonial administrator at the court of the raja of Nepal | Loganiaceae | Qu |
| Gardnerina | George Gardner (1810–1849) | Asteraceae | Bu |
| Garnieria | Jules Garnier (1839–1904) | Proteaceae | Bu |
| Garnotia | Prosper Garnot (1794–1838) | Poaceae | Qu |
| Garrettia | Henry Burton Guest Garrett (1871–1959), forester and plant collector, conservator with the Forestry Department in Chiang Mai, Thailand | Lamiaceae | Qu |
| Garrya | Nicholas Garry (c. 1782 – 1856), merchant and trader | Garryaceae | Ch |
| Gastoniella | Gerald Joseph Gastony (b.1940), American botanist working at the University of Michigan | Pteridaceae | Bt |
| Gaudichaudia | Charles Gaudichaud-Beaupré (1789–1854) | Malpighiaceae | Bu |
| Gaudinia | Jean François Aimé Théophile Philippe Gaudin (1766–1833) | Poaceae | Qu |
| Gaultheria | Jean François Gaultier (1708–1756) | Ericaceae | Co |
| Gaussia | Carl Friedrich Gauss (1777–1855), mathematician | Arecaceae | Qu |
| Gaya | Jaques Étienne Gay (1786–1864) | Malvaceae | Bu |
| Gaylussacia | Joseph Louis Gay-Lussac (1778–1850), chemist | Ericaceae | St |
| Gayophytum | Claude Gay (1800–1873) | Onagraceae | Qu |
| Gazania | Theodorus Gaza (1398–1478), classicist | Asteraceae | Co |
| Geesinkorchis | Robert Geesink (1945–1992), Dutch botanist at the herbarium in Leiden | Orchidaceae | Bu |
| Geigeria | Philipp Lorenz Geiger (1785–1836) | Asteraceae | Bu |
| Geijera | J. D. Geijer (fl. 1686), Swedish botanist | Rutaceae | Qu |
| Geleznowia | Nikolái Zheleznov (1816–1877), Russian professor of agronomy at Moscow State University | Rutaceae | Qu |
| Genlisea | Stéphanie Félicité, comtesse de Genlis (1746–1830) | Lentibulariaceae | Qu |
| Gennaria | Patrizio Gennari (1820–1897) | Orchidaceae | Qu |
| Gentiana | Gentius (d. 168 BC), king | Gentianaceae | Ch |
| Gentianella | Gentius (d. 168 BC), king | Gentianaceae | St |
| Gentianopsis | Gentius (d. 168 BC), king | Gentianaceae | Bu |
| Gentianothamnus | Gentius (d. 168 BC), king | Gentianaceae | Bu |
| Geoffroea | Claude Joseph Geoffroy (1685–1752) | Fabaceae | Bu |
| Geohintonia | George S. Hinton (b. 1949), Mexican rancher from Nuevo León who discovered this genus | Cactaceae | Bu |
| Georgeantha | Alex George (b. 1939) | Ecdeiocoleaceae | Bu |
| Gerardiina | John Gerard (1545–1612) | Orobanchaceae | Bu |
| Gerbera | Traugott Gerber (1710–1743), German doctor and botanist | Asteraceae | Co |
| Gereaua | Roy Emile Gereau (b. 1947) | Sapindaceae | Bu |
| Germainia | Rodolphe Germain (1827–1917), French doctor and veterinarian in the colonial forces in Vietnam | Poaceae | Bu |
| Gerrardanthus | William Tyrer Gerrard (c. 1831 – 1866) | Cucurbitaceae | Qu |
| Gerrardina | William Tyrer Gerrard (c. 1831 – 1866) | Gerrardinaceae | Qu |
| Gerritea | Gerrit Davidse (b. 1940), Dutch-born American professor at Washington University in St. Louis and curator at the Missouri Botanical Garden | Poaceae | Bu |
| Gesneria | Conrad Gessner (1516–1565) | Gesneriaceae | St |
| Gesnouinia | François Gesnouin (1750–1814), French naval apothecary; taught chemistry in Brest | Urticaceae | Bu |
| Ghikaea | Dimitrie Ghica-Comănești (1839–1923) and Nicholas Dimitri Ghika (1875–1921), plant collector | Orobanchaceae | Bu |
| Gibbsia | Lilian Gibbs (1870–1925) | Urticaceae | Bu |
| Gibsoniothamnus | Dorothy L. Nash Gibson (1921–2012), American botanist who studied the flora of Veracruz and Guatemala | Schlegeliaceae | Qu |
| Gilberta | John Gilbert (1812–1845) | Asteraceae | Qu |
| Gilbertiodendron | Georges Charles Clément Gilbert (1908–1983), Belgian plant collector and professor of botany in Leuven | Fabaceae | Bu |
| Gilesia | Christopher Giles (c. 1840 – 1917), surveyor, and Ernest Giles (1835–1897) | Malvaceae | Bu |
| Gilgiochloa | Ernest Friedrich Gilg (1867–1933) | Poaceae | Qu |
| Gilia | Filippo Luigi Gilii (1756–1821), Italian clergyman, naturalist and astronomer who worked in part in the Vatican City | Polemoniaceae | Co |
| Giliastrum | Filippo Luigi Gilii (1756–1821), Italian clergyman, naturalist and astronomer who worked in part in the Vatican City | Polemoniaceae | Qu |
| Gillbeea | William Gillbee (1825–1885), Australian surgeon in Melbourne; supported botanical expeditions | Cunoniaceae | Bu |
| Gillenia | Arnold Gille (1586–1633), German doctor | Rosaceae | Co |
| Gillespiea | John Wynn Gillespie (1901–1932), American botanist who collected in Fiji; specialist in Rubiaceae | Rubiaceae | Bu |
| Gilletiodendron | Justin Gillet (1866–1943), Belgian clergyman and plant collector | Fabaceae | Qu |
| Gilliesia | John Gillies (1792–1834) | Amaryllidaceae | Qu |
| Gilmania | Marshall French Gilman (1871–1944), American botanist from California with a focus on the flora of Death Valley | Polygonaceae | Qu |
| Gilruthia | John A. Gilruth (1871–1937) | Asteraceae | Qu |
| Ginoria | Carlo Ginori (1702–1757), manufacturer | Lythraceae | Bu |
| Girardinia | Jean Pierre Louis Girardin (1803–1884), French agricultural chemist; professor in Rouen and Lille | Urticaceae | Bu |
| Girgensohnia | Gustav Karl Girgensohn (1786–1872), Estonian botanist; court counselor in Tartu | Amaranthaceae | Qu |
| Gironniera | Paul de la Gironière (1797–1862) | Cannabaceae | Qu |
| Gisekia | Paul Dietrich Giseke (1741–1796) | Gisekiaceae | Qu |
| Givotia | anagram derived from Joachim Otto Voigt (1798–1843) | Euphorbiaceae | Bu |
| Gjellerupia | Knud Gjellerup (1876–1954), Danish doctor in Dutch service who participated in a German and Dutch expedition to New Guinea in 1909 and 1910 | Opiliaceae | Bu |
| Glaziophyton | Auguste François Marie Glaziou (1828–1906) | Poaceae | Qu |
| Gleadovia | Frank Gleadow (1856–1930), English forester and plant collector in India who discovered this plant | Orobanchaceae | Bu |
| Gleasonia | Henry A. Gleason (1882–1975) | Rubiaceae | Qu |
| Gleditsia | Johann Gottlieb Gleditsch (1714–1786) | Fabaceae | Co |
| Glehnia | Peter von Glehn (1835–1876) | Apiaceae | Qu |
| Gleichenia | Wilhelm Friedrich von Gleichen (1717–1783) | Gleicheniaceae | Bt |
| Gleichenella | Wilhelm Friedrich von Gleichen (1717–1783) | Gleicheniaceae | Bt |
| Glekia | Georg Ludwig Engelhard Krebs (1792–1844) | Scrophulariaceae | Qu |
| Glionnetia | Guy Lionnet (1922–2007) | Rubiaceae | Bu |
| Gloxinella | Benjamin Peter Gloxin (1765–1794) | Gesneriaceae | Bu |
| Gloxinia | Benjamin Peter Gloxin (1765–1794) | Gesneriaceae | Ba |
| Gmelina | Johann Georg Gmelin (1709–1755) | Lamiaceae | St |
| Gochnatia | Frédéric Charles Gochnat (1784–1816), French botanist in Strasbourg with a focus on chicory | Asteraceae | Bu |
| Godmania | Frederick DuCane Godman (1834–1919) | Bignoniaceae | Qu |
| Godoya | Manuel Godoy (1767–1851), statesman | Ochnaceae | Bu |
| Goeppertia | Heinrich Göppert (1800–1884) | Marantaceae | Bu |
| Goerkemia | Görkem Yıldırımlı (20th and 21st centuries), Turkish plant collector, son of the botanist Şinasi Yıldırımlı (b. 1949); they founded a herbarium | Brassicaceae | Bu |
| Goethalsia | George Washington Goethals (1858–1928), army officer and engineer | Malvaceae | Bu |
| Goetzea | Johann August Ephraim Goeze (1731–1823) | Solanaceae | Bu |
| Goldbachia | Carl Ludwig Goldbach (1793–1824), German-born Russian professor of botany in Moscow | Brassicaceae | Qu |
| Goldmanella | Edward Alphonso Goldman (1873–1946) | Asteraceae | Bu |
| Gomesa | Bernardino Gomez (1769–1823), Portuguese botanist and naval surgeon | Orchidaceae | St |
| Gomortega | Casimiro Gómez Ortega (1741–1818) | Gomortegaceae | Bu |
| Gongora | Antonio Caballero y Góngora (1740–1818), archbishop | Orchidaceae | St |
| Gontscharovia | Nikolái Gontscharow (1900–1942), Russian botanist and collector | Lamiaceae | Bu |
| Gonzalagunia | Francisco Gonzales Laguna (d. 1899), Spanish clergyman and botanist in Lima | Rubiaceae | Bu |
| Gonzalezia | María del Socorro González Elizondo (b. 1953), Mexican plant taxonomist with a focus on Cyperaceae | Asteraceae | Bu |
| Goodallia | Edward Angelo Goodall (1819–1908), painter and illustrator | Thymelaeaceae | Bu |
| Goodenia | Samuel Goodenough (1743–1827) | Goodeniaceae | Ch |
| Goodia | Peter Good (d. 1803) | Fabaceae | St |
| Goodmania | George Jones Goodman (1904–1999), American professor of botany at the University of Oklahoma and curator of the herbarium there | Polygonaceae | Qu |
| Goodyera | John Goodyer (1592–1664) | Orchidaceae | St |
| Gorceixia | Claude-Henri Gorceix (1842–1919) | Asteraceae | Bu |
| Gordonia | James Gordon (c. 1708 – 1780), London horticulturalist | Theaceae | Ba |
| Gorteria | David de Gorter (1717–1783) | Asteraceae | Qu |
| Gossia | Wayne Goss (1951–2014), politician | Myrtaceae | Bu |
| Gossweilera | John Gossweiler (1873–1952) | Asteraceae | Qu |
| Gouania | Antoine Gouan (1733–1821) | Rhamnaceae | Qu |
| Goudaea | Eric Gouda (b. 1957), Dutch botanist; specialist in Bromeliaceae | Bromeliaceae | Bu |
| Gouinia | François Marie Gabriel Gouin (1818–1873), French military doctor; collected grasses in Veracruz in Mexico | Poaceae | Bu |
| Govenia | James Robert Gowen (1783–1862), English horticulturist from the village of Highclere in Hampshire, England; experimented with rhododendrons; secretary of the Royal Horticultural Society | Orchidaceae | Qu |
| Graderia | anagram derived from John Gerard (1545–1612) | Orobanchaceae | Bu |
| Graellsia | Mariano de la Paz Graells y de la Agüera (1809–1898) | Brassicaceae | Qu |
| Graffenrieda | Franz Ludwig von Graffenried (1600–1661), Swiss nobleman; published Johann Bauhin's Historia plantarum universalis | Melastomataceae | Bu |
| Grafia | Žiga Graf (1801–1838), German doctor and botanist in Ljubljana | Apiaceae | Bu |
| Grahamia | Maria Graham (1785–1842), writer and illustrator, and/or Robert Graham (1786–1845) | Anacampserotaceae | Qu |
| Grandidiera | Alfred Grandidier (1836–1921) | Achariaceae | Qu |
| Grangea | Joseph-Louis Lagrange (1736–1813), mathematician | Asteraceae | Bu |
| Grangeopsis | Joseph-Louis Lagrange (1736–1813), mathematician | Asteraceae | Bu |
| Grangeria | Claude Granger (c. 1680 – 1737), French doctor who traveled and collected seeds in Judah and Egypt | Chrysobalanaceae | Bu |
| Grauanthus | Jürke Grau (b. 1937), German botanist who worked in systematic botany at LMU Munich | Asteraceae | Bu |
| Grausa | Jürke Grau (b. 1937), German botanist who worked in systematic botany at LMU Munich | Loasaceae | Bt |
| Gravesia | Louis Graves (1791–1857), French botanist, geologist and archeologist; director of waterways and forests in Oise in France | Melastomataceae | Qu |
| Grayia | Asa Gray (1810–1888) | Amaranthaceae | Qu |
| Grazielanthus | Graziela Maciel Barroso (1912–2003) | Monimiaceae | Bu |
| Grazielia | Graziela Maciel Barroso (1912–2003) | Asteraceae | Bu |
| Grazielodendron | Graziela Maciel Barroso (1912–2003) | Fabaceae | Bu |
| Greenea | Benjamin Daniel Greene (1793–1862) | Rubiaceae | Qu |
| Greeneocharis | Edward Lee Greene (1843–1915) | Boraginaceae | Qu |
| Greeniopsis | Benjamin Daniel Greene (1793–1862) | Rubiaceae | Bu |
| Greenmaniella | Jesse More Greenman (1867–1951) | Asteraceae | Qu |
| Greenwayodendron | Percy James Greenway (1897–1980), South African botanist at the agricultural research station and herbarium in Nairobi, Kenya | Annonaceae Greenwoodiella | Qu |
| Greenwoodiella | Edward Warren Greenwood (1918–2002), Canadian botanist who explored Mexico | Orchidaceae | Bt |
| Gregbrownia | Gregory K. Brown (b. 1951), American botanist; specialist in Bromeliaceae | Bromeliaceae | Bu |
| Greigia | Samuel Greig (1827–1887), president of the Russian Horticultural Society | Bromeliaceae | St |
| Greslania | Ivenor de Greslan (1839–1900), French agronomist; born in Réunion | Poaceae | Bu |
| Greuteria | Werner Rodolfo Greuter, (b.1938) Swiss botanist and chair of the Editorial Committee for the (ICBN) | Fabaceae | Bt |
| Grevea | Grevé (d. 1895), French naturalist and rancher on Madagascar; collected plants and fossils | Montiniaceae | Bu |
| Grevillea | Charles Francis Greville (1749–1809), antiquarian | Proteaceae | Co |
| Grewia | Nehemiah Grew (1641–1712) | Malvaceae | St |
| Greyia | George Grey (1812–1898), explorer | Melianthaceae | St |
| Griffinia | William Griffin (d. 1827), London horticulturalist | Amaryllidaceae | St |
| Griffonia | Marie-Théophile Griffon du Bellay (1829–1908) | Fabaceae | Bu |
| Grimmeodendron | Friedrich Wilhelm Grimme (1827–1887), writer and botanist | Euphorbiaceae | Bu |
| Grindelia | David Hieronymus Grindel (1776–1836), Latvian botanist | Asteraceae | St |
| Grisebachianthus | August Grisebach (1814–1879) | Asteraceae | Qu |
| Griselinia | Francesco Griselini (1717–1783), Italian botanist | Griseliniaceae | Ch |
| Grisollea | Augustin Grisolle (1811–1869), doctor | Stemonuraceae | Bu |
| Grobya | George Grey, 8th Baron Grey of Groby (1802–1835) | Orchidaceae | Qu |
| Groenlandia | Johannes Groenland (1824–1891) | Potamogetonaceae | Qu |
| Gronovia | Jan Frederik Gronovius (1686–1762) | Loasaceae | Qu |
| Grosourdya | René de Grosourdy (1807–1864), French doctor, chemist and botanist; plant collector in Cuba, Puerto Rico and South America | Orchidaceae | Qu |
| Grossera | Wilhelm Carl Heinrich Grosser (1869–1942), German botanist, director of a research institute in Wrocław | Euphorbiaceae | Qu |
| Grosvenoria | American journalists Gilbert Hovey Grosvenor (1875–1966) and his son Melville Bell Grosvenor (1901–1982) and grandson Gilbert M. Grosvenor (b. 1931) | Asteraceae | Bu |
| Grubbia | Michael Grubb (1728–1808), Swedish botanist, plant collector and mineralogist | Grubbiaceae | Qu |
| Grubovia | Valeri Grúbov (1917–2009), Russian botanist with a focus on central Asia | Amaranthaceae | Bu |
| Grusonia | Hermann Gruson (1821–1885), industrialist | Cactaceae | Ba |
| Guanchezia | Francisco J. Guánchez (b. 1953), Venezuelan plant collector who organized botanical excursions | Orchidaceae | Bu |
| Guardiola | José Antonio Fernández de Ceballos González-Calderón, Marquès de Guardiola (1767–1824), Mexican naturalist, student of Vicente Cervantes | Asteraceae | Bu |
| Guatteria | Giambattista Guatteri (1739–1793), Italian professor of botany in Parma | Annonaceae | Bu |
| Gueldenstaedtia | Johann Anton Güldenstädt (1745–1781) | Fabaceae | Qu |
| Guettarda | Jean-Étienne Guettard (1715–1786) | Rubiaceae | Qu |
| Guevaria | Alvaro E. Guevara, an American from Austin, Texas; assisted the author of the genus, Robert Merrill King | Asteraceae | Bu |
| Guibourtia | Nicolas-Jean-Baptiste-Gaston Guibourt (1790–1867) | Fabaceae | Qu |
| Guichenotia | Antoine Guichenot (1783–1867) | Malvaceae | Qu |
| Guilfoylia | William Guilfoyle (1840–1912) | Surianaceae | Qu |
| Guilleminea | Jean Baptiste Antoine Guillemin (1796–1842) | Amaranthaceae | Qu |
| Guioa | José Guio y Sánchez (fl. 1794), Spanish plant illustrator, including for Luis Née | Sapindaceae | Qu |
| Guiraoa | Ángel Guirao y Navarro (1817–1890), Spanish doctor, naturalist and politician from Murcia who discovered this plant | Brassicaceae | Bu |
| Guizotia | François Guizot (1787–1874), historian | Asteraceae | St |
| Gundelia | Andreas von Gundelsheimer (1668–1715) | Asteraceae | Qu |
| Gundlachia | Juan Gundlach (1810–1896) | Asteraceae | Bu |
| Gunillaea | Gunilla Thulin, wife of the Swedish botanist (and author of this genus) Mats Thulin (b. 1948) | Campanulaceae | Bu |
| Gunnarella | Gunnar Seidenfaden (1908–2001) | Orchidaceae | Qu |
| Gunnera | Johan Ernst Gunnerus (1718–1773) | Gunneraceae | Ch |
| Gunnessia | Ann Gunness (20th century), collector of this plant and others in the vicinity of Weipa, Queensland, in Australia | Apocynaceae | Bu |
| Gunniopsis | Ronald Campbell Gunn (1808–1881) | Aizoaceae | Qu |
| Gustavia | Gustav III (1746–1792) | Lecythidaceae | Bu |
| Gutenbergia | Johannes Gutenberg (1400–1468), printer | Asteraceae | Bu |
| Guthriea | Francis Guthrie (1831–1899) | Achariaceae | Qu |
| Gutierrezia | Pedro Gutierrez (fl. 1802), Spanish botanist in El Puerto de Santa María | Asteraceae | Bu |
| Guynesomia | Guy L. Nesom (b. 1945) | Asteraceae | Bu |
| Guyonia | Jean Guyon (1794–1870), French military doctor; chief military surgeon in Algeria | Melastomataceae | Bu |
| Guzmania | Anastasio Guzman (d. 1807), Spanish apothecary and naturalist | Bromeliaceae | Ba |
| Gyminda | Franz Mygind (1710–1789), Danish and Austrian court official; collected plants in Barbados | Celastraceae | Bu |
| Haageocereus | Walther Max Haage (1899–1992), German gardener and nonfiction author; inherited a cactus nursery, and supported many cactus-collecting expeditions | Cactaceae | Ba |
| Haastia | Julius von Haast (1824–1887) | Asteraceae | Ba |
| Haberlea | Carl Constantin Haberle (1764–1832), professor of botany in Hungary | Gesneriaceae | St |
| Hablitzia | Carl Ludwig Hablitz (1752–1821) | Amaranthaceae | St |
| Hackelia | Josef Hackel (1783–1869), Bohemian clergyman; professor of agriculture at a school in Litoměřice | Boraginaceae | Qu |
| Hackelochloa | Eduard Hackel (1850–1926) | Poaceae | Qu |
| Hacquetia | Belsazar Hacquet (1739–1815) | Apiaceae | Co |
| Haeckeria | Gottfried Renatus Haecker (1789–1864), German apothecary, botanist and conservator in Lübeck | Asteraceae | Qu |
| Haegiela | Laurence Haegi (b. 1952), Australian botanist at the botanical garden in Adelaide, Australia | Asteraceae | Bu |
| Hagenbachia | Karl Friedrich Hagenbach (1771–1849), Swiss doctor and professor of botany and anatomy at the University of Basel | Asparagaceae | Qu |
| Hagenia | Karl Gottfried Hagen (1749–1829) | Rosaceae | Qu |
| Hagsatera | Eric Hágsater (b. 1945), Mexican botanist and herbarium director; specialist in orchids | Orchidaceae | Qu |
| Hainardia | Pierre Hainard (1936-2019), Swiss botanist and ecologist from Geneva | Poaceae | Bu |
| Hakea | Christian Ludwig von Hake (1745–1818), German botanical patron | Proteaceae | St |
| Halacsya | Eugen von Halácsy (1842–1913) | Boraginaceae | Qu |
| Halenia | Jonas Petri Halenius (1727–1810), Swedish doctor and student of Carl Linnaeus | Gentianaceae | Bu |
| Halesia | Stephen Hales (1677–1761) | Styracaceae | Co |
| Halfordia | George Britton Halford (1824–1910), physiologist | Rutaceae | Qu |
| Halgania | Emmanuel Halgan (1771–1852), naval officer | Boraginaceae | Qu |
| Halleorchis | Nicolas Hallé (b. 1927), French botanist at the National Museum of Natural History | Orchidaceae | Bu |
| Halleria | Albrecht von Haller (1708–1777) | Stilbaceae | Qu |
| Hallianthus | Harry Hall (1906–1986) | Aizoaceae | Qu |
| Hamelia | Henri-Louis Duhamel du Monceau (1700–1781) | Rubiaceae | St |
| Hamilcoa | Hamilcar I of Carthage (5th century BC) | Euphorbiaceae | Bu |
| Hammarbya | Carl Linnaeus | Orchidaceae | Qu |
| Hammeria | Steven A. Hammer (b. 1951), American botanist, horticulturist and plant collector | Aizoaceae | Bu |
| Hampea | Georg Ernst Ludwig Hampe (1795–1880) | Malvaceae | Qu |
| Hanabusaya | Hanabusa Yoshitada (1842–1917), Japanese diplomat | Campanulaceae | Bu |
| Hanburia | Daniel Hanbury (1825–1875) | Cucurbitaceae | Bu |
| Hancea | Henry Fletcher Hance (1827–1886) | Euphorbiaceae | Qu |
| Hanceola | Henry Fletcher Hance (1827–1886) | Lamiaceae | Qu |
| Hancockia | William Hancock (1847–1914), Irish botanist who collected for Kew Gardens in Asia | Orchidaceae | Qu |
| Hancornia | Phillip Hancorn (c.1757-1804), English seafarer, in the service of the Portuguese navy for many years | Apocynaceae | Qu |
| Handelia | Heinrich von Handel-Mazzetti (1882–1940) | Asteraceae | Qu |
| Handeliodendron | Heinrich von Handel-Mazzetti (1882–1940) | Sapindaceae | Qu |
| Handroanthus | Oswaldo Handro (1908–1986) | Bignoniaceae | Bu |
| Haniffia | Mohamed Haniff (d. 1930), plant collector who oversaw botanical gardens in present-day Malaysia | Zingiberaceae | Qu |
| Hannafordia | Samuel Hannaford (1828–1874), English and Australian journalist who wrote about botany and agriculture | Malvaceae | Qu |
| Hannonia | Hanno the Navigator (c. 480 BC – 440 BC) | Amaryllidaceae | Bu |
| Hanseniella | Bertel Hansen (1932–2005) Danish botanist and lecturer | Podostemaceae | Bt |
| Hanslia | Johanna "Hansli" Cnefelius, née Hegner, a friend of the author of the genus, Anton Karl Schindler | Fabaceae | Bu |
| Harashuteria | Hiroshi Hara (1911–1986) | Fabaceae | Bu |
| Harbouria | Jared Patterson Harbour (1831–1917), collector in the Rocky Mountains of North America | Apiaceae | St |
| Hardenbergia | Franziska, Countess von Hardenberg (1794–1870) | Fabaceae | Co |
| Hardwickia | Thomas Hardwicke (1756–1835) | Fabaceae | Qu |
| Harfordia | William George Willoughby Harford (1825–1911), American botanist and taxonomist; curator at the California Academy of Sciences | Polygonaceae | Bu |
| Harleya | Harley Harris Bartlett (1886–1960) | Asteraceae | Bu |
| Harleyodendron | Raymond Mervyn Harley (b. 1936), English botanist at Kew Gardens; collected in England, Brazil, Mexico and Paraguay | Fabaceae | Bu |
| Harmandia | Jules Harmand (1845–1921), French naval doctor and naturalist; collected in Southeast Asia, Japan and present-day Sri Lanka | Olacaceae | Bu |
| Harmonia | Harvey Monroe Hall (1874–1932) | Asteraceae | Bu |
| Harmsia | Hermann Harms (1870–1942) | Malvaceae | Qu |
| Harmsiodoxa | Hermann Harms (1870–1942) | Brassicaceae | Qu |
| Harmsiopanax | Hermann Harms (1870–1942) | Araliaceae | Qu |
| Harnackia | Adolf von Harnack (1851–1930), historian | Asteraceae | Bu |
| Haroldia | Harold E. Robinson (b. 1932) | Asteraceae | Bt |
| Haroldiella | Harold St. John (1892–1991) | Urticaceae | Bu |
| Harperella | Roland McMillan Harper (1878–1966) | Apiaceae | Bu |
| Harperocallis | Roland McMillan Harper (1878–1966) | Tofieldiaceae | Qu |
| Harrisia | William Harris (1860–1920), Superintendent of the Public Gardens in Jamaica | Cactaceae | St |
| Harrysmithia | Karl August Harald Smith (1889–1971), Swedish and American botanist, curator at the botanical museum in Uppsala | Apiaceae | Qu |
| Hartleya | Thomas Gordon Hartley (1931–2016) | Stemonuraceae | Bu |
| Hartliella | Dimitri Hartl (1926–2015), German botanist, professor at the University of Mainz; worked on Scrophulariaceae | Linderniaceae | Bu |
| Hartmanthus | Heidrun Hartmann (1942–2016), German botanist, professor at the University of Hamburg | Aizoaceae | Bt |
| Hartogiopsis | Johannes Hartog (c. 1663 – 1722), German gardener and plant collector in Dutch service in present-day Sri Lanka and South Africa | Celastraceae | Qu |
| Hartwrightia | Samuel Hart Wright (1825–1905) | Asteraceae | Bu |
| Harveya | William Henry Harvey (1811–1866) | Orobanchaceae | Qu |
| Hasseltia | Johan Conrad van Hasselt (1797–1823) | Salicaceae | Qu |
| Hasseltiopsis | Johan Conrad van Hasselt (1797–1823) | Salicaceae | Qu |
| Hastingsia | Serranus Clinton Hastings (1813–1893), lawyer | Asparagaceae | Bu |
| Hatiora | anagram of Hariota, after Thomas Harriot (1560–1621), scientist | Cactaceae | Co |
| Hatschbachiella | Gerdt Guenther Hatschbach (1923–2013), Brazilian botanist and taxonomist who founded the botanical museum in Curitiba | Asteraceae | Bu |
| Haumania | Lucien Leon Hauman (1880–1965) | Marantaceae | Qu |
| Haumaniastrum | Lucien Leon Hauman (1880–1965) | Lamiaceae | Qu |
| Haussknechtia | Heinrich Carl Haussknecht (1838–1903) | Apiaceae | Qu |
| Hauya | René Just Haüy (1743–1822) | Onagraceae | Bu |
| Havardia | Valery Havard (1846–1927) | Fabaceae | Qu |
| Havetiopsis | Armand Havet (1795–1820) | Clusiaceae | Bu |
| Hawkesiophyton | Jack Hawkes (1915–2007) | Solanaceae | Bu |
| Haworthia | Adrian Hardy Haworth (1768–1833) | Asphodelaceae | St |
| Haworthiopsis | Adrian Hardy Haworth (1768–1833) | Asphodelaceae | Bt |
| Haya | George William Robertson Hay (1845–1915), British doctor and naturalist | Caryophyllaceae | Bu |
| Hazardia | Barclay Hazard (1852–1938), American amateur botanist in Santa Barbara, California | Asteraceae | Qu |
| Hebenstretia | Johann Ernst Hebenstreit (1702–1757) | Scrophulariaceae | St |
| Heberdenia | Thomas Heberden (1703–1769), William Heberden (1710–1801), or William Heberden the Younger (1767–1845), possibly | Primulaceae | Bu |
| Hechtia | Julius Gottfried Konrad Hecht (1771–1837), Prussian counsellor | Bromeliaceae | St |
| Heckeldora | Édouard Marie Heckel (1843–1916) | Meliaceae | Qu |
| Hectorella | James Hector (1834–1907) | Montiaceae | Qu |
| Hedbergia | Karl Olov Hedberg (1923–2007) | Orobanchaceae | Bu |
| Hedinia | Sven Hedin (1865–1952) | Brassicaceae | Qu |
| Hedlundia | Johan Teodor Hedlund (1861–1953), Swedish botanist | Rosaceae | Bt |
| Hedstromia | John Maynard Hedstrom (1872–1951), politician | Rubiaceae | Bu |
| Heeria | Oswald Heer (1809–1883) | Anacardiaceae | Qu |
| Hegnera | Johanna "Hansli" Cnefelius, née Hegner, a friend of the author of the genus, Anton Karl Schindler | Fabaceae | Bu |
| Heimia | Ernst Ludwig Heim (d. 1834) | Lythraceae | St |
| Heinsenia | Ernst Heinsen (fl. 1894), German botanist from Glücksburg who collected this plant | Rubiaceae | Qu |
| Heinsia | Daniël Heinsius (1580–1655), classicist | Rubiaceae | Qu |
| Heiseria | Charles Bixler Heiser (1920–2010) | Asteraceae | Bu |
| Heisteria | Lorenz Heister (1683–1758) | Olacaceae | Qu |
| Heldreichia | Theodor von Heldreich (1822–1902) | Brassicaceae | Qu |
| Helietta | Louis Théodore Hélie (1804–1867), French doctor and teacher; wrote about Ruta | Rutaceae | Bu |
| Hellenia | Carl Niclas von Hellens (1745–1820) | Costaceae | Qu |
| Helleriella | Alfonse Henry Heller (1894–1973), American mining engineer and botanist; specialist in orchids | Orchidaceae | Bu |
| Hellmuthia | Hellmuth Steudel (1816–1886), German doctor in Esslingen; son of Ernst Gottlieb von Steudel | Cyperaceae | Bu |
| Helmholtzia | Hermann von Helmholtz (1821–1894), scientist | Philydraceae | Qu |
| Helmiopsiella | C. Helm, German clergyman in Berlin; amateur botanist | Malvaceae | Bu |
| Helmiopsis | C. Helm, German clergyman in Berlin; amateur botanist | Malvaceae | Bu |
| Helmontia | Jan Baptist van Helmont (1580–1644), chemist | Cucurbitaceae | Bu |
| Helwingia | Georg Andreas Helwing (1666–1748) | Helwingiaceae | Ch |
| Hemiboea | François Beau (1723–1804), clergyman | Gesneriaceae | Bu |
| Hemsleya | William Hemsley (1843–1924) | Cucurbitaceae | Qu |
| Henckelia | Leo Victor Felix Henckel von Donnersmarck (1785–1861), German administrator; amateur botanist and member of a society of naturalists in Halle | Gesneriaceae | Qu |
| Henleophytum | Friedrich Gustav Jakob Henle (1809–1885), doctor | Malpighiaceae | Qu |
| Hennecartia | Jules-François Hennecart (1797–1888), French politician and banker who acquired Victor Jacquemont's herbarium | Monimiaceae | Qu |
| Henonia | Jacques-Louis Hénon (1802–1872), politician | Amaranthaceae | Qu |
| Henoonia | possibly Jacques-Louis Hénon (1802–1872), politician | Solanaceae | Bu |
| Henophyton | Jean Baptiste Adrien Hénon (1821–1896), French military language interpreter; teacher of Arabic in Algeria; plant collector | Brassicaceae | Bu |
| Henrardia | Johannes Theodoor Henrard (1881–1974), Dutch pharmacist and botanist; curator at the university herbarium in Leiden | Poaceae | Qu |
| Henricksonia | James Solberg Henrickson (b. 1940) | Asteraceae | Bu |
| Henrya | Aimé Constant Fidèle Henry (1801–1875), French-born German bookseller in Bonn; member of the German National Academy of Sciences Leopoldina | Acanthaceae | Qu |
| Henslowia | John Stevens Henslow (1796–1861) | Santalaceae | Qu |
| Hensmania | Alfred Hensman (1834–1902), politician | Asphodelaceae | Bu |
| Heppiella | Johann Adam Philipp Hepp (1797–1867) | Gesneriaceae | Qu |
| Herbertia | William Herbert (1778–1847) | Iridaceae | Ba |
| Herbstia | Derral Raymon Herbst (b. 1934), American botanist in Hawaii | Amaranthaceae | Bu |
| Herderia | Johann Gottfried Herder (1744–1803), philosopher | Asteraceae | Bu |
| Herissantia | Louis-Antoine-Prosper Hérissant (1745–1769), French doctor, naturalist and poet | Malvaceae | Qu |
| Heritiera | Charles Louis L'Héritier de Brutelle (1746–1800) | Malvaceae | Qu |
| Hermannia | Paul Hermann (1646–1695) | Malvaceae | St |
| Hermbstaedtia | Sigismund Friedrich Hermbstädt (1760–1833) | Amaranthaceae | Qu |
| Hernandia | Francisco Hernández de Toledo (1514–1587) | Hernandiaceae | Qu |
| Herodotia | Herodotus (c. 485 BC – c. 424 BC), historian | Asteraceae | Qu |
| Herrania | Pedro Alcántara Herrán (1800–1872), army general and diplomat | Malvaceae | Qu |
| Herreranthus | Pedro Pablo Herrera Oliver (20th and 21st centuries), Cuban biologist who worked at the ministry of science in Havana; specialist in native Asteraceae | Asteraceae | Bu |
| Herreria | Gabriel Alonso de Herrera (c. 1470 – 1539) | Asparagaceae | Bu |
| Herreriopsis | Gabriel Alonso de Herrera (c. 1470 – 1539) | Asparagaceae | Qu |
| Hertia | Johann Casimir Hertius (1679–1748), German doctor and botanist; wrote a dissertation on Pimpinella | Asteraceae | Qu |
| Hesperomannia | Horace Mann Jr. (1844–1868) | Asteraceae | Qu |
| Hessea | Christian Heinrich Friedrich Hesse (1772–1832) | Amaryllidaceae | Bu |
| Heuchera | Johann Heinrich von Heucher (1677–1746) | Saxifragaceae | Co |
| Hewittia | Hewett Watson (1804–1881) | Convolvulaceae | Bu |
| Heynea | Benjamin Heyne (1770–1819) | Meliaceae | Qu |
| Heynella | Karel Heyne (1877–1947) | Apocynaceae | Qu |
| Heywoodia | Arthur William Heywood (1853–1918), was with the forest department in Cape Town, South Africa | Phyllanthaceae | Qu |
| Hibbertia | George Hibbert (1757–1837), merchant and slaver | Dilleniaceae | St |
| Hickelia | Paul Robert Hickel (1865–1935), French botanist and dendrologist, active in forest preservation; founded the Société dendrologique | Poaceae | Bu |
| Hicksbeachia | Michael Hicks Beach, 1st Earl St Aldwyn (1837–1916) | Proteaceae | Qu |
| Hidalgoa | Miguel Hidalgo y Costilla (1753–1811), priest and independence fighter | Asteraceae | Bu |
| Hiepia | Tiên Hiêp Nguyên (b. 1947), Vietnamese botanist; organized field research excursions in Southeast Asia | Apocynaceae | Bu |
| Hiernia | William Philip Hiern (1839–1925) | Orobanchaceae | Qu |
| Hieronyma | Joaquim Jerônimo Serpa (1773 – c. 1843), Brazilian doctor; professor of botany and director of the botanical garden in Olinda and Pernambuco | Phyllanthaceae | Bu |
| Hieronymiella | Georg Hans Emmo Wolfgang Hieronymus (1846–1921) | Amaryllidaceae | Bu |
| Hilaria | Augustin Augustin Saint-Hilaire (1779–1853), French botanist and entomologist; explored and collected in South America for many years | Poaceae | Qu |
| Hildebrandtia | Johann Maria Hildebrandt (1847–1881) | Convolvulaceae | Qu |
| Hildegardia | Hildegard of Bingen (1098–1179) | Malvaceae | Qu |
| Hillebrandia | William Hillebrand (1821–1886) | Begoniaceae | Qu |
| Hilleria | Matthaeus Hiller (1646–1725), German clergyman, professor and linguist in Tübingen | Petiveriaceae | Qu |
| Hillia | John Hill (1716–1775) | Rubiaceae | Qu |
| Hilliardia | Olive Mary Hilliard (b. 1925) | Asteraceae | Bu |
| Hilliardiella | Olive Mary Hilliard (b. 1925) | Asteraceae | Bu |
| Hindsia | Richard Brinsley Hinds (1811–1846) | Rubiaceae | Qu |
| Hinterhubera | Rudolph Hinterhuber (1802–1892), Austrian botanist and apothecary in Bolzano and Mondsee | Asteraceae | Bu |
| Hintonella | George Hinton (1882–1943), English-born Mexican mining engineer and plant collector | Orchidaceae | Qu |
| Hintonia | George Hinton (1882–1943), English-born Mexican mining engineer and plant collector | Rubiaceae | Qu |
| Hippia | Hippias (c. 443 BC – c. 393 BC), philosopher | Asteraceae | Bu |
| Hippocratea | Hippocrates (c. 460 BC – c. 377 BC), doctor | Celastraceae | Qu |
| Hippolytia | Ippolit Krashenínnikov (1884–1947), Russian botanist and geographer; specialist in Asteraceae | Asteraceae | Bu |
| Hiraea | Jean-Nicolas de La Hire (1685–1727), French doctor and botanist | Malpighiaceae | Qu |
| Hirschfeldia | Christian Cay Lorenz Hirschfeld (1742–1794) | Brassicaceae | Qu |
| Hitchcockella | A. S. Hitchcock (1865–1935) | Poaceae | Qu |
| Hladnikia | Franz Hladnik (1773–1844) | Apiaceae | Qu |
| Hochreutinera | Bénédict Pierre Georges Hochreutiner (1873–1959) | Malvaceae | Qu |
| Hockinia | George Curnow Hockin (1812–1890), friend of the author of the genus in Rio de Janeiro, Brazil, and his brother John Hockin (1810–1893), an amateur botanist in Dominica | Gentianaceae | Bu |
| Hodgkinsonia | Clement Hodgkinson (1818–1893) | Rubiaceae | Qu |
| Hodgsonia | Brian Houghton Hodgson (1800–1894) | Cucurbitaceae | Qu |
| Hodgsoniola | John Hodgson (1799–1860), politician | Asphodelaceae | Qu |
| Hoehnea | Frederico Carlos Hoehne (1882–1959) | Lamiaceae | Qu |
| Hoehneella | Frederico Carlos Hoehne (1882–1959) | Orchidaceae | Qu |
| Hoehnephytum | Frederico Carlos Hoehne (1882–1959) | Asteraceae | Qu |
| Hoffmannanthus | Karl August Otto Hoffmann (1853–1909) | Asteraceae | Bu |
| Hoffmannia | Georg Franz Hoffmann (1761–1826) | Lamiaceae | St |
| Hoffmanniella | Karl August Otto Hoffmann (1853–1909) | Asteraceae | Qu |
| Hoffmannseggia | Johann Centurius Hoffmannsegg (1766–1849) | Fabaceae | Qu |
| Hofmeisterella | Wilhelm Hofmeister (1824–1877) | Orchidaceae | Qu |
| Hofmeisteria | Friedrich Hofmeister (1782–1864), German publisher and plant collector who built up a botanical garden and herbarium | Asteraceae | Qu |
| Hohenackeria | Rudolph Friedrich Hohenacker (1798–1874) | Apiaceae | Qu |
| Hohenbergia | Duke Paul Wilhelm of Württemberg (1797–1860) | Bromeliaceae | Ba |
| Hohenbergiopsis | Duke Paul Wilhelm of Württemberg (1797–1860) | Bromeliaceae | Bu |
| Hollandaea | Henry Holland, 1st Viscount Knutsford (1825–1914) | Proteaceae | Bu |
| Hollermayera | Athanasius Hollermayer (1860–1945), German clergyman and plant collector in Chile | Brassicaceae | Bu |
| Hollisteria | William Welles Hollister, American rancher; this plant was found on his property in Santa Barbara, California | Polygonaceae | Qu |
| Holmbergia | Eduardo Ladislao Holmberg (1852–1937) | Amaranthaceae | Qu |
| Holmgrenanthe | Patricia Kern Holmgren (b. 1940), Noel Herman Holmgren (b. 1937), and Arthur Herman Holmgren (1912–1992) | Plantaginaceae | Bu |
| Holmskioldia | Johan Theodor Holmskjold (1732–1794) | Lamiaceae | St |
| Holstianthus | Bruce K. Holst (b. 1957), American botanist who worked at the Missouri Botanical Garden and the Marie Selby Botanical Gardens in Florida | Rubiaceae | Bu |
| Holttumochloa | Richard Eric Holttum (1895–1990) | Poaceae | Bu |
| Holubia | Emil Holub (1847–1902) | Pedaliaceae | Bu |
| Holzneria | Wolfgang Holzner (1942–2014), Austrian botanist, Japanologist, and professor in Vienna | Plantaginaceae | Bu |
| Homollea | Anne-Marie Homolle (1905–1988) | Rubiaceae | Qu |
| Honckenya | Gerhard August Honckeny (1724–1805) | Caryophyllaceae | Qu |
| Hoodia | William Chamberlain Hood (1790–1879), British doctor in Lambeth and collector of succulents | Apocynaceae | Bu |
| Hooglandia | Ruurd Dirk Hoogland (1922–1994) | Cunoniaceae | Bu |
| Hookerochloa | Joseph Dalton Hooker (1817–1911) | Poaceae | Bu |
| Hopea | John Hope (1725–1786) | Dipterocarpaceae | Qu |
| Hopkinsia | John Marquis Hopkins (1870–1912), politician | Restionaceae | Qu |
| Hoppea | David Heinrich Hoppe (1760–1846) | Gentianaceae | Qu |
| Horaninovia | Pavel Gorianinov (1796–1866), Russian botanist with a focus on fungus and ferns; professor at the medical academy in Saint Petersburg | Amaranthaceae | Qu |
| Horichia | Clarence Klaus Horich (1921–1994), German botanist who collected in Canada and Central and South America; specialist in cactus | Orchidaceae | Qu |
| Hornea | John Horne (1835–1905) | Sapindaceae | Qu |
| Hornschuchia | Christian Friedrich Hornschuch (1793–1850) | Annonaceae | Bu |
| Hornstedtia | Claës Fredrik Hornstedt (1758–1809) | Zingiberaceae | Qu |
| Hornungia | Ernst Gottfried Hornung (1795–1862), Germany apothecary in Aschersleben; collected plants and bugs in the Harz | Brassicaceae | Qu |
| Horovitzia | Salomón Horovitz (1897–1978), Argentinian agricultural engineer; professor of genetics at the National University of La Plata | Caricaceae | Bu |
| Horsfieldia | Thomas Horsfield (1773–1859) | Myristicaceae | Qu |
| Horsfordia | Eben Norton Horsford (1818–1893) and Frederick Hinsdale Horsford (1855–1923), American rancher and gardener | Malvaceae | Bu |
| Horstrissea | Horst Risse (1948–1989), German botanist at the botanical garden in Dahlem in Berlin | Apiaceae | Bu |
| Hortia | Garcia de Orta (c. 1500 – c. 1570) | Rutaceae | Bu |
| Hortonia | Anne Wilmot-Horton (1787–1871), amateur botanist with knowledge of the plants of present-day Sri Lanka | Monimiaceae | Bu |
| Horvatia | Adolf Olivér Horvát (1907–1997), Hungarian botanist; teacher of the author of this genus, Leslie Andrew Garay | Orchidaceae | Qu |
| Horwoodia | Arthur Reginald Horwood (1879–1937), British paleobotanist and lichenologist at the city museum in Leicester and the Kew Herbarium | Brassicaceae | Qu |
| Hosackia | David Hosack (1769–1835) | Fabaceae | St |
| Hosea | George Hose (1838–1922), clergyman and plant collector | Lamiaceae | Bu |
| Hosiea | Alexander Hosie (1853–1925), English diplomat, researcher and plant collector in China | Icacinaceae | Qu |
| Hoslundia | Ole Haaslund-Schmidt (d. 1802), Danish botanist and plant collector in Ghana | Lamiaceae | Qu |
| Hosta | Nicolaus Thomas Host (1771–1834) | Asparagaceae | Co |
| Hottarum | Mitsuru Hotta (1935–2015) | Araceae | Bu |
| Hottonia | Petrus Houttuyn (1648–1709) | Primulaceae | Co |
| Houlletia | Romain Jean Baptiste Houllet (1815–1890), French horticulturalist | Orchidaceae | St |
| Houstonia | William Houstoun (1695–1733) | Rubiaceae | Co |
| Houttuynia | Martinus Houttuyn (1720–1798) | Saururaceae | Co |
| Hovea | Anton Pantaleon Hove (d. 1830), Polish-born botanist | Fabaceae | St |
| Hovenia | David ten Hove (1724–1787), Dutch senator | Rhamnaceae | St |
| Hoverdenia | Adrian Josef Graf von Hoverden-Plencken (1798–1875), Silesian administrator and collector; president of the former museum in Wrocław | Acanthaceae | Bu |
| Howellia | Thomas J. Howell (1842–1912) and his brother Joseph Howell (1830–1912) | Campanulaceae | Qu |
| Howelliella | John Thomas Howell (1903–1994) | Plantaginaceae | Qu |
| Howittia | Godfrey Howitt (1800–1873) | Malvaceae | Qu |
| Hoya | Thomas Hoy (c. 1750 – 1822) | Apocynaceae | Co |
| Hua | Henri Hua (1861–1919), French botanist, curator at the National Museum of Natural History | Huaceae | Bu |
| Huangtcia | Tseng-Chieng Huang (b.1931) Taiwanese/Chinese botanist | Fabaceae | Bt |
| Hubbardia | Charles Edward Hubbard (1900–1980) | Poaceae | Qu |
| Hubbardochloa | Charles Edward Hubbard (1900–1980) | Poaceae | Qu |
| Huberantha | Herbert Franz Josef Huber (1931–2005) | Annonaceae | Bt |
| Huberia | François Huber (1750–1831) and his son Jean Pierre Huber | Melastomataceae | Bu |
| Huberodendron | Jacques Huber (1867–1914) | Malvaceae | Bu |
| Huberopappus | Otto Huber (b. 1944) | Asteraceae | Bu |
| Hubertia | Joseph Hubert (1747–1826), French farmer on Réunion; wrote on the horticulture of exotic plants | Asteraceae | Bu |
| Hudsonia | William Hudson (1730–1793) | Cistaceae | St |
| Huernia | Justus Heurnius (b. 1587), Dutch missionary and plant collector | Apocynaceae | St |
| Huertea | Jerónimo Gómez de la Huerta (1573–1643), Spanish personal physician, naturalist, poet and humanist | Tapisciaceae | Qu |
| Hughesia | Regina Olson Hughes (1895–1993) | Asteraceae | Bu |
| Hugonia | August Johann von Hugo (1686–1760), German personal physician at the court in Hannover; maintained a large herbarium | Linaceae | Bu |
| Hugueninia | Auguste Huguenin (1780–1860), French teacher of natural history; curator of the museum in Chambéry | Brassicaceae | Bu |
| Huidobria | Francisco García de Huidobro Aldunate (1791–1852), Chilean politician and director of the national library; conservator at the natural history museum | Loasaceae | Bu |
| Hullettia | Richmond William Hullett (1843–1914) | Moraceae | Qu |
| Hullsia | Charles Stephen Hulls (c. 1835–1923), accompanied John McKinlay on expeditions | Asteraceae | Bu |
| Hulsea | Gilbert White Hulse (1807–1883), American military doctor, botanist and plant collector | Asteraceae | Qu |
| Humbertacalia | Jean-Henri Humbert (1887–1967) | Asteraceae | Qu |
| Humbertia | Philibert Commerson (1727–1773) | Convolvulaceae | Bu |
| Humbertiella | Jean-Henri Humbert (1887–1967) | Malvaceae | Qu |
| Humbertiodendron | Jean-Henri Humbert (1887–1967) | Trigoniaceae | Qu |
| Humbertioturraea | Jean-Henri Humbert (1887–1967) | Meliaceae | Qu |
| Humbertochloa | Jean-Henri Humbert (1887–1967) | Poaceae | Qu |
| Humboldtia | Alexander von Humboldt (1769–1859) | Fabaceae | Qu |
| Humeocline | Amelia Egerton, Lady Hume (1751–1809) | Asteraceae | Bu |
| Hunnemannia | John Hunneman (d. 1839), English bookseller | Papaveraceae | St |
| Hunteria | William Hunter (1755–1812), colonial administrator and botanist | Apocynaceae | Qu |
| Huntleya | John Thomas Huntley (1792?–1881?), a reverend and orchid grower | Orchidaceae | Qu |
| Hunzikeria | Armando Theodoro Hunziker (1919–2001) | Solanaceae | Bu |
| Huodendron | Hu Xiansu (1894–1968) | Styracaceae | Bu |
| Hutchinsonia | John Hutchinson (1884–1972) | Rubiaceae | Qu |
| Huttonaea | Caroline Hutton (1826–1908), English plant collector in South Africa with a focus on orchids; discovered this plant | Orchidaceae | Qu |
| Huynhia | Kim-Lang Huynh (b.1935) Swiss botanist working at the University of Neuchâtel | Boraginaceae | Bt |
| Hylandia | Bernard Hyland (b. 1937) | Euphorbiaceae | Qu |
| Ianhedgea | Ian Charleson Hedge (b. 1928) | Brassicaceae | Bu |
| Ibervillea | Pierre Le Moyne d'Iberville (1661–1706), explorer | Cucurbitaceae | Bu |
| Idesia | Eberhard Isbrand Ides (1657–1708), diplomat | Salicaceae | Co |
| Ignurbia | Ignatz Urban (1848–1931) | Asteraceae | Bt |
| Ikonnikovia | Nikolai Petrovic Ikonnikov-Galitzky (1892–1942), Russian botanist who traveled extensively in Mongolia | Plumbaginaceae | Bu |
| Ildefonsia | Antonio Ildefonso Gomes de Freitas (1794–1859), Brazilian botanist; doctor in Rio de Janeiro | Plantaginaceae | Bu |
| Iljinia | Modest Ilín (1889–1967), Russian botanist and naturalist; taught at the university and botanical garden in Saint Petersburg; specialist in Chenopodiaceae and Asteraceae | Amaranthaceae | Bu |
| Illigera | Johann Karl Wilhelm Illiger (1775–1813) | Hernandiaceae | Qu |
| Imperata | Ferrante Imperato (1550–1625) | Poaceae | Co |
| Incarvillea | Pierre Nicolas d'Incarville (1706–1757) | Bignoniaceae | Co |
| Indofevillea | Louis Feuillée (1660–1732) | Cucurbitaceae | Bu |
| Indorouchera | Jean-Antoine Roucher (1745–1794), nature poet | Linaceae | Qu |
| Inezia | Inez Clare Verdoorn (1896–1989) | Asteraceae | Qu |
| Iriartea | Bernardo de Iriarte (1735–1814), diplomat | Arecaceae | Qu |
| Iriartella | Bernardo de Iriarte (1735–1814), diplomat | Arecaceae | Qu |
| Irlbachia | Franz Gabriel von Bray (1765–1832), Bavarian diplomat and naturalist; president of the botanical society in Regensburg | Gentianaceae | Bu |
| Irvingbaileya | Irving Widmer Bailey (1884–1967) | Stemonuraceae | Qu |
| Irvingia | Edward Irving (1816–1855) | Irvingiaceae | Qu |
| Isabelia | Isabel, Princess Imperial of Brazil (1846–1921) | Orchidaceae | Qu |
| Isertia | Paul Erdmann Isert (1757–1789) | Rubiaceae | St |
| Isidodendron | Isidoro Cabrera-Rodriguez (b. 1922), Colombian dendrologist and plant collector at the herbarium of the University of Valle | Trigoniaceae | Bu |
| Isidorea | Isidore Geoffroy Saint-Hilaire (1805–1861) | Rubiaceae | Bu |
| Isidroa | Isidro E. Méndez (b. 1958), Cuban botanist; specialist in Verbenaceae, especially Lantana | Verbenaceae | Bu |
| Itoa | Keisuke Itō (1803–1901) and his grandson Tokutarō Itō (1868–1941) | Salicaceae | Qu |
| Ivania | Ivan Murray Johnston (1898–1960) | Brassicaceae | Bu |
| Ivanjohnstonia | Ivan Murray Johnston (1898–1960) | Boraginaceae | Qu |
| Jablonskia | Eugene Jablonszky (1892–1975), German and Hungarian paleobotanist and plant taxonomist; also a geologist | Phyllanthaceae | Bu |
| Jackiopsis | William Jack (1795–1822) | Rubiaceae | Bu |
| Jacksonia | George Jackson (1780–1811) | Fabaceae | Bu |
| Jacobsenia | Hermann Jacobsen (1898–1978), German gardener and botanist; curator and supervisor at a botanical garden in Kiel; specialist in succulents | Aizoaceae | Bu |
| Jacquemontia | Victor Jacquemont (1801–1832) | Convolvulaceae | St |
| Jacqueshuberia | Jacques Huber (1867–1914) | Fabaceae | Bu |
| Jacquinia | Nikolaus Joseph von Jacquin (1727–1817) | Primulaceae | Bu |
| Jacquiniella | Nikolaus Joseph von Jacquin (1727–1817) | Orchidaceae | Bu |
| Jaegeria | Georg Friedrich von Jäger (1785–1866), German doctor, naturalist and paleontologist in Stuttgart; taught natural science | Asteraceae | Bu |
| Jaeschkea | Heinrich August Jäschke (1817–1883), linguist and missionary | Gentianaceae | Bu |
| Jaeschkea | Heinrich August Jäschke (1817–1883), linguist and missionary | Gentianaceae | Bu |
| Jaffrea | Tanguy Jaffré, French botanist working for the IRD in New Caledonia | Rhamnaceae | Bt |
| Jagrantia | Jason Randall Grant (b. 1969), American botanist in Neuchâtel, Switzerland; specialist in Bromeliaceae | Bromeliaceae | Bu |
| Jaimehintonia | Jaime or James Hinton (1915–2006), American businessman, writer and plant collector; also a farmer in Mexico for many years | Asparagaceae | Bu |
| Jamesbrittenia | James Britten (1846–1924) | Scrophulariaceae | Bu |
| Jamesia | Edwin James (1797–1861) | Hydrangeaceae | St |
| Jamesianthus | Robert Leslie James (1897–1977), American teacher, botanist and historian who discovered this plant | Asteraceae | Bu |
| Jamesonia | William Jameson (1796–1873) | Pteridaceae | Bt |
| Janotia | Maurice-Marie Janot (1903–1978), French doctor, biochemist, biologist and pharmacologist at the Institut de Chimie des Substances Naturelles | Rubiaceae | Bu |
| Jansenella | Pieter Jansen (1882–1955), Dutch botanist and teacher in Rotterdam and Amsterdam with a focus on grasses | Poaceae | Bu |
| Jaramilloa | Roberto Jaramillo Mejía (1919–2006), Colombian botanist at the Instituto de Ciencias Naturales | Asteraceae | Bu |
| Jarandersonia | James Aidan Robb Anderson (1922–2004), English forester, botanist and plant collector with the Forestry Service in Sarawak (now in Malaysia) | Malvaceae | Bu |
| Jasarum | Julian Alfred Steyermark (1909–1988) | Araceae | Bu |
| Jaumea | Jean Henri Jaume Saint-Hilaire (1772–1845) | Asteraceae | Bu |
| Jefea | Billie Lee Turner (1925–2020) | Asteraceae | Bu |
| Jeffersonia | Thomas Jefferson (1743–1826), president | Berberidaceae | Co |
| Jeffreya | Charles Jeffrey (b. 1934), English botanist at Kew Gardens with a focus on Chinese flora; specialist in Asteraceae and Cucurbitaceae | Asteraceae | Bu |
| Jeffreycia | Charles Jeffrey (b. 1934), English botanist at Kew Gardens with a focus on Chinese flora; specialist in Asteraceae and Cucurbitaceae | Asteraceae | Bu |
| Jejewoodia | Jeffrey James Wood (b. 1952), English botanist at Kew Gardens; specialist in orchids | Orchidaceae | Bu |
| Jensenobotrya | Emil Jensen (1889–1963), German-Namibian rancher near the bay at Lüderitz; amateur botanist with a focus on desert flora, including Welwitschia | Aizoaceae | Bu |
| Jensia | Jens Clausen (1891–1969) | Asteraceae | Bu |
| Jepsonia | Willis Linn Jepson (1867–1946) | Saxifragaceae | Bu |
| Jerdonia | Thomas C. Jerdon (1811–1872) | Gesneriaceae | Bu |
| Jessea | Jesse More Greenman (1867–1951) | Asteraceae | Bu |
| Joannesia | John VI of Portugal (1767–1826) | Euphorbiaceae | Bu |
| Jobinia | Jobin, a French plant illustrator, including for Flora Brasiliensis | Apocynaceae | Bu |
| Johanneshowellia | John Thomas Howell (1903–1994) | Polygonaceae | Bu |
| Johannesteijsmannia | Johannes Elias Teijsmann (1808–1882) | Arecaceae | Bu |
| Johnsonia | Thomas Johnson (c. 1600 – 1644) | Asphodelaceae | Bu |
| Johnstonalia | Marshall Conring Johnston (b. 1930) | Rhamnaceae | Bu |
| Johnstonella | Ivan Murray Johnston (1898–1960) | Boraginaceae | Bu |
| Johrenia | Martin Daniel Johren (d. 1718), German doctor and botanist; professor of medicine in Frankfurt (Oder) | Apiaceae | Bu |
| Joinvillea | François d'Orléans, Prince of Joinville (1818–1900) | Joinvilleaceae | Bu |
| Jollydora | Adrien Jolly (1854–1949), French gardener, specimen preparer and plant collector | Connaraceae | Bu |
| Joosia | Emil Joos (1826–1895) and Wilhelm Joos (1821–1900), doctors and naturalists | Rubiaceae | Bu |
| Jordaaniella | Pieter Gerhardus Jordaan (1913–1987), South African botanist, professor at Stellenbosch University | Aizoaceae | Bu |
| Joseanthus | José Cuatrecasas (1903–1996) | Asteraceae | Bu |
| Jouvea | Joseph Duval-Jouve (1810–1883) | Poaceae | Bu |
| Jovellana | Gaspar Melchor de Jovellanos (1744–1811), statesman | Calceolariaceae | Co |
| Jovetia | Paul Jovet (1896–1991), French botanist; specialist in bryophytes and the flora of west and southwest France | Rubiaceae | Bu |
| Juanulloa | Jorge Juan y Santacilia (1713–1773), scientist, and Antonio de Ulloa (1716–1795), admiral | Solanaceae | Bu |
| Jubaea | Juba II (c. 50 BC – 24) | Arecaceae | Bu |
| Jubaeopsis | Juba II (c. 50 BC – 24) | Arecaceae | St |
| Jubelina | Jean Jubelin (1787–1860), French colonial administrator and politician; provided support to François Mathias René Leprieur and other scientists | Malpighiaceae | Bu |
| Julbernardia | Marie Joseph Jules Pierre Bernard (1876–1950), French colonial administrator; governor in Gabon | Fabaceae | Bu |
| Jumellea | Henri Lucien Jumelle (1866–1935) | Orchidaceae | Bu |
| Jumelleanthus | Henri Lucien Jumelle (1866–1935) | Malvaceae | Bu |
| Junellia | Sven Albert Brynolt Junell (b. 1901), Swedish botanist with a focus on Verbenaceae and Lamiaceae | Verbenaceae | Bu |
| Jungia | Joachim Jungius (1587–1657), mathematician and natural scientist | Asteraceae | Bu |
| Jurinea | André Jurine (1780–1804), Swiss botanist | Asteraceae | St |
| Justicia | James Justice (1698–1763) | Acanthaceae | Co |
| Juttadinteria | Jutta Dinter (1871–1949), wife and colleague of the German botanist Kurt Dinter | Aizoaceae | St |

== See also ==
- List of plant genus names with etymologies: A–C, D–K, L–P, Q–Z
- List of plant family names with etymologies
