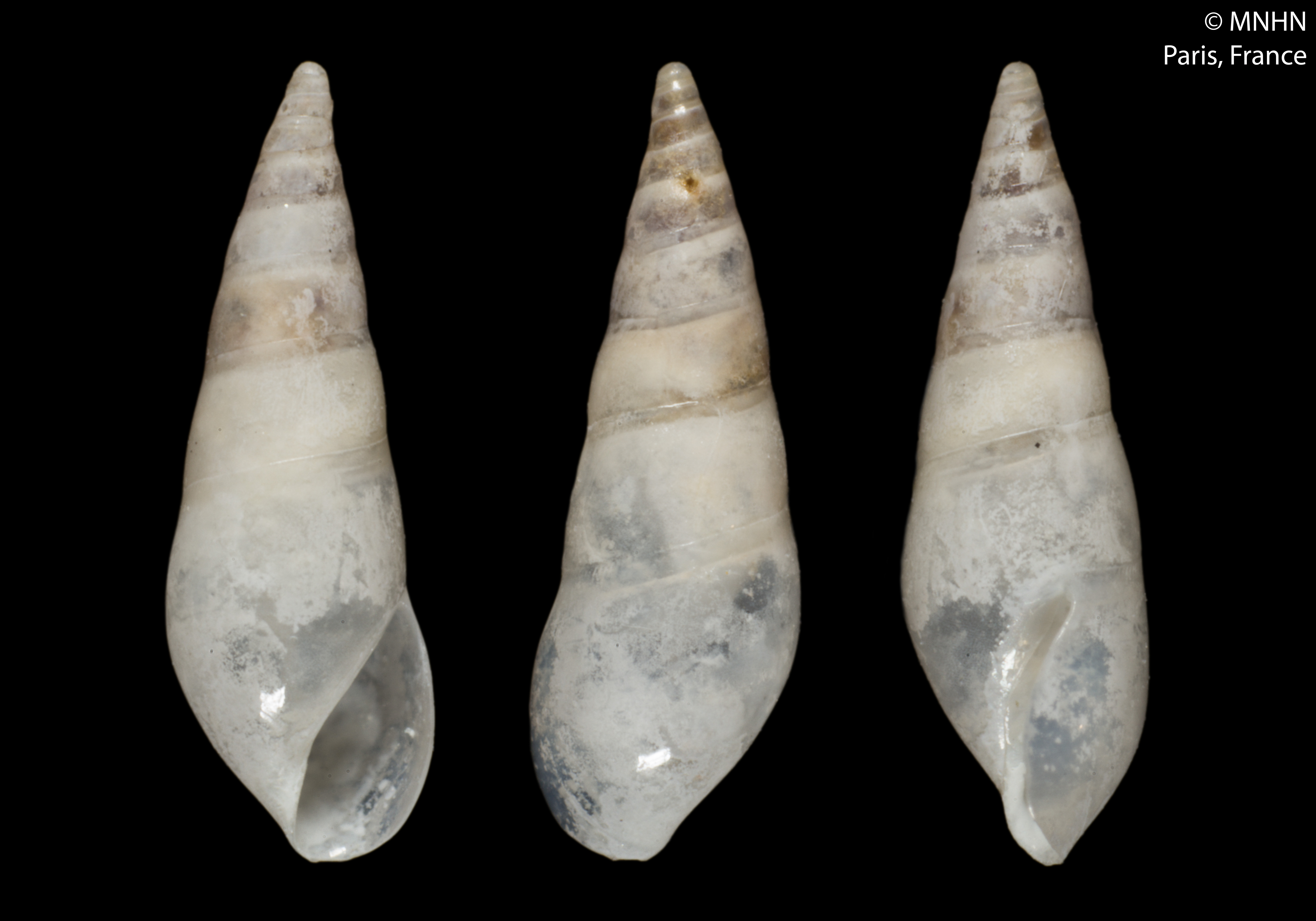
- Shell of Curveulima obliquistoma (holotype at MNHN, Paris)

Scientific classification
- Kingdom: Animalia
- Phylum: Mollusca
- Class: Gastropoda
- Subclass: Caenogastropoda
- Order: Littorinimorpha
- Family: Eulimidae
- Genus: Curveulima; Laseron, 1955

Type species
- Curveulima cornuta Laseron, 1955

= Curveulima =

Genus of gastropods

Curveulima is a major genus of medium-sized sea snails, marine gastropod mollusks in the family Eulimidae.

== Species ==
There are multiple known species to exist within the genus, Curveulima, these include the following:

- Curveulima abrupta (Laseron, 1955)
- Curveulima aupouria (Powell, 1937)
- Curveulima beneitoi (Peñas & Rolán, 2006)
- Curveulima bollonsi (Powell, 1937)
- Curveulima capensis (Thiele, 1915)
- Curveulima carifa (Bartsch, 1915)
- Curveulima cornuta (Laseron, 1955)
- Curveulima dautzenbergi (Pallary, 1900)
- Curveulima denscolubri (Melvill, 1896)
- Curveulima devians (Monterosato, 1884)
- Curveulima eschara (Bouchet & Warén, 1986)
- Curveulima icafra (Bartsch, 1915)
- Curveulima indiscreta (Tate, 1898)
- Curveulima komai (Habe, 1950)
- Curveulima litoris (Laseron, 1955)
- Curveulima macrophtalmica (Warén, 1972)
- Curveulima manifesta (Laseron, 1955)
- Curveulima marshalli (Bouchet & Warén, 1986)
- Curveulima obliquistoma (Bouchet & Warén, 1986)
- Curveulima otakauica (Dell, 1956)
- Curveulima pinguicula (A. Adams, 1861)
- Curveulima styla (Hoffman, van Heugten & Lavaleye, 2011)
- Curveulima titahica (Suter, 1908)

Species brought into synonymy

- Curveulima commensalis (Tate, 1898): synonym of Vitreolina commensalis (Tate, 1898)
- Curveulima echinocardiachila (Habe, 1976): synonym of Hypermastus exhinocardiachila (Habe, 1976)
- Curveulima flavipunctata (Habe, 1961): synonym of Amamibalcis flavipunctata (Habe, 1961)
- Curveulima lata (Laseron, 1955): synonym of Parvioris subobtusa (Laseron, 1955)
- Curveulima macrophthalmica (Warén, 1972): synonym of Curveulima macrophtalmica (Warén, 1972)
- Curveulima nishimurai (Habe, 1958): synonym of Eulitoma nishimurai (Habe, 1958)
- Curveulima obtusa (Laseron, 1955): synonym of Melanella obtusa (Laseron, 1955)
- Curveulima quantilla (Turton, 1932): synonym of Curveulima icafra (Bartsch, 1915)
- Curveulima subobtusa (Laseron, 1955): synonym of Parvioris subobtusa (Laseron, 1955)

Taxon inquirendum

- Curveulima kowiensis (Turton, 1932)
