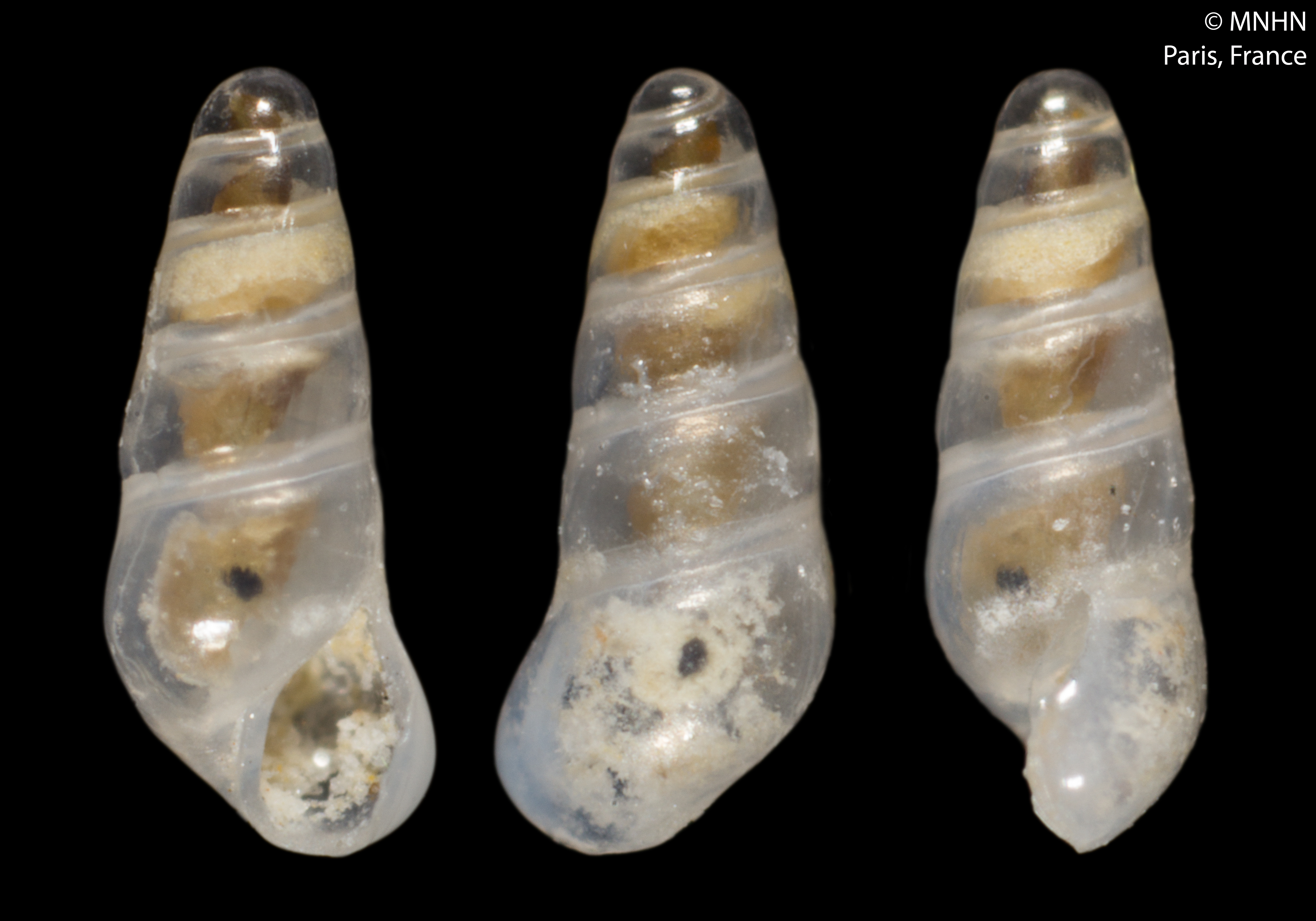
- Shell of Fusceulima projectilabrum

Scientific classification
- Kingdom: Animalia
- Phylum: Mollusca
- Class: Gastropoda
- Subclass: Caenogastropoda
- Order: Littorinimorpha
- Superfamily: Vanikoroidea
- Family: Eulimidae
- Genus: Fusceulima; Laseron, 1955

Type species
- Fusceulima jacksonensis Laseron, 1955

= Fusceulima =

Genus of gastropods

Fusceulima is a genus of sea snails, marine gastropod mollusks in the family Eulimidae.

== Species ==
Species within this genus include:

- Fusceulima asser (Bartsch, 1915)
- Fusceulima boscheineni (Engl, 1998)
- Fusceulima castanea (Laseron, 1955)
- Fusceulima coralensis Hoffman & Freiwald, 2017
- Fusceulima digitalis Hoffman & Engl, 2021
- Fusceulima flava Laseron, 1955
- Fusceulima fulva (Watson, 1897)
- Fusceulima goodingi (Warén, 1981)
- Fusceulima ignota (Thiele, 1925)
- Fusceulima immaculata (Dall, 1927)
- Fusceulima ingolfiana (Bouchet & Warén, 1986)
- Fusceulima innotabilis (Turton, 1932)
- Fusceulima inusta (Hedley, 1906)
- Fusceulima jacksonensis Laseron, 1955
- Fusceulima lineata (Monterosato, 1869)
- Fusceulima lutea (Turton, 1932)
- Fusceulima mangonuica (Powell, 1940)
- Fusceulima minuta (Jeffreys, 1884)
- Fusceulima murdochi (Hedley, 1904)
- Fusceulima projectilabrum (Bouchet & Warén, 1986)
- Fusceulima saturata Souza & Pimenta, 2014
- Fusceulima sordida (Watson, 1897)
- Fusceulima thalassae (Bouchet & Warén, 1986)
- Fusceulima toffee Souza & Pimenta, 2014
- Fusceulima victorhensenae Hoffman & Freiwald, 2017

Species brought into synonymy

- Fusceulima major (Bouchet & Warén, 1986): synonym of Fuscapex major (Bouchet & Warén, 1986)
- Fusceulima richteri (Engl, 1998): synonym of Sticteulima richteri Engl, 1997
- Fusceulima sucina (Laseron, 1955): synonym of Fusceulima jacksonensis Laseron, 1955
