= F. lutea =

F. lutea may refer to:

- Fernandoa lutea, a plant endemic to Tazmania
- Ficus lutea, an African tree
- Filobasidiella lutea, a parasitic fungus
- Fistulinella lutea, a bolete fungus
- Fringilla lutea, an African sparrow
- Fritillaria lutea, a bulbous plant
- Fusceulima lutea, a sea snail
