= Sticteulima =

Scientific classification
- Kingdom: Animalia
- Phylum: Mollusca
- Class: Gastropoda
- Subclass: Caenogastropoda
- Order: Littorinimorpha
- Family: Eulimidae
- Genus: Sticteulima; Laseron, 1955

Type species
- Sticteulima cameroni Laseron, 1955

Synonyms
- Lentigobalcis Habe, 1961

Genus of gastropods

Sticteulima is a genus of very small ectoparasitic sea snails, marine gastropod mollusks or micromollusks in the Eulimidae family.

== Species ==
Species within the genera Sticteulima include:

- Sticteulima australiensis (Thiele, 1930)
- Sticteulima badia (Watson, 1897)
- Sticteulima cameroni Laseron, 1955
- Sticteulima constellata (Melvill, 1898)
- Sticteulima fuscopunctata (E. A. Smith, 1890)
- Sticteulima incidenta (Laseron, 1955)
- Sticteulima jeffreysiana (Brusina, 1869)
- Sticteulima kawamurai (Habe, 1961)
- Sticteulima lata Bouchet & Warén, 1986
- Sticteulima lentiginosa (A. Adams, 1861)
- Sticteulima piperata (Sowerby, 1901)
- Sticteulima piperita (Hedley, 1909)
- Sticteulima plenicolora Raines, 2003
- Sticteulima portensis (Laseron, 1955)
- Sticteulima richteri Engl, 1997
- Sticteulima spreta (A. Adams, 1864)
- Sticteulima wareni Engl, 1997

Taxa inquirenda:

- Sticteulima amamiensis (Habe, 1961)
- Sticteulima ariel (A. Adams, 1861)
- Sticteulima interrupta (A. Adams, 1864)

Species brought into synonymy

- Sticteulima kermadecensis (Oliver, 1915): synonym of Melanella kermadecensis W. R. B. Oliver, 1915
