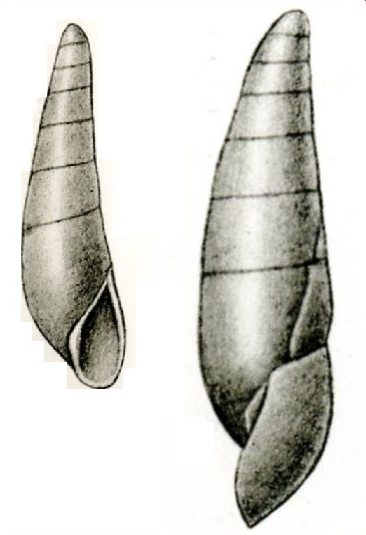
- Shell of Melanella gratiosa (original image)

Scientific classification
- Kingdom: Animalia
- Phylum: Mollusca
- Class: Gastropoda
- Subclass: Caenogastropoda
- Order: Littorinimorpha
- Family: Eulimidae
- Genus: Melanella
- Species: M. gratiosa

Binomial name
- Melanella gratiosa (Thiele, 1925)

Synonyms
- Eulima gratiosa Thiele, 1925

= Melanella gratiosa =

Species of gastropod

Melanella gratiosa is a species of sea snail, a marine gastropod mollusk in the family Eulimidae.

== Description ==
The shell measures 4.75 mm in height and 1.25 mm in diameter, while the height of the aperture is 1.5 mm.

(Original description in German) This species differs from Curveulima capensis (Thiele, 1915) in having a much blunter apex and is therefore less conical in outline.

The shell is moderately curved, slenderly conical, and rather thick, with a very glossy surface. Of the seven whorls, the first is fairly large, rounded, and pointed, while the succeeding whorls are scarcely convex and bear an oblique series of growth increments. The body whorl is convex below. The aperture is fairly long and narrow and is somewhat produced below the middle. The apertural margin is slightly thickened at the columella and is connected by a distinct callus.

== Distribution ==
This marine species occurs off the Agulhas Bank, South Africa.
