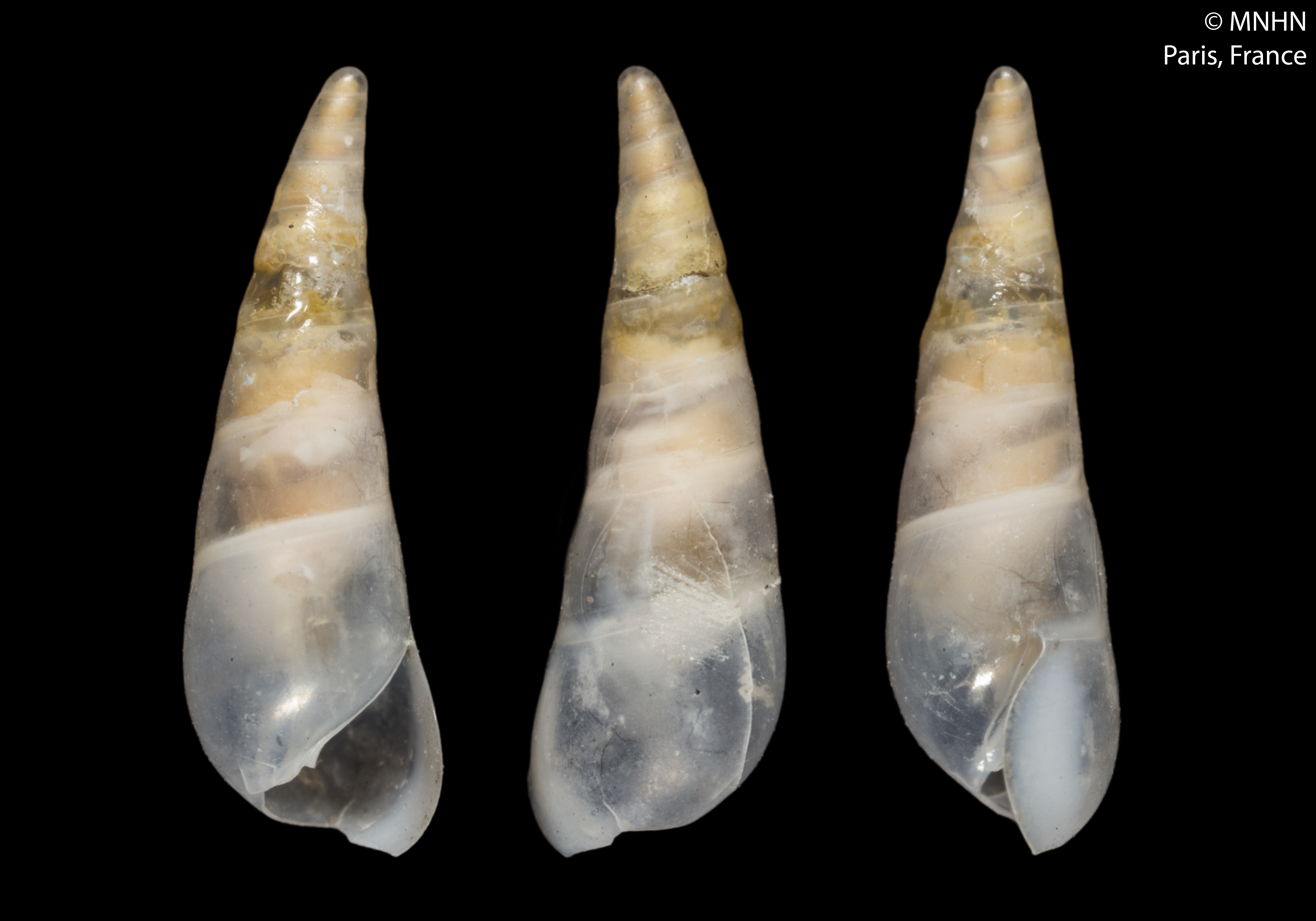
- Shell of Eulitoma arcus

Scientific classification
- Kingdom: Animalia
- Phylum: Mollusca
- Class: Gastropoda
- Subclass: Caenogastropoda
- Order: Littorinimorpha
- Superfamily: Vanikoroidea
- Family: Eulimidae
- Genus: Eulitoma; Laseron, 1955

Type species
- Eulitoma nitens Laseron, 1955

= Eulitoma =

Genus of gastropods

Eulitoma is a genus of sea snails, marine gastropod mollusks in the family Eulimidae.

== Species ==
Species within this genus include the following:

- Eulitoma akauni (Habe, 1952)
- Eulitoma arcus (Bouchet & Warén, 1986)
- Eulitoma insignis (Dautzenberg & Fischer H.,1896)
- Eulitoma josephinae (Bouchet & Warén, 1986)
- Eulitoma langfordi (Dall, 1925)
- Eulitoma nishimurai (Habe, 1958)
- Eulitoma nitens (Laseron, 1955)
- Eulitoma obtusiuscula (Bouchet & Warén, 1986)

Species brought into synonymy

- Eulitoma arca (Bouchet & Warén, 1986):synonym of Eulitoma arcus (Bouchet & Warén, 1986)
- Eulitoma castanea (Laseron, 1955): synonym of Fusceulima castanea (Laseron, 1955)
