= Fusceulima immaculata =

Scientific classification
- Kingdom: Animalia
- Phylum: Mollusca
- Class: Gastropoda
- Subclass: Caenogastropoda
- Order: Littorinimorpha
- Superfamily: Vanikoroidea
- Family: Eulimidae
- Genus: Fusceulima
- Species: F. immaculata

Binomial name
- Fusceulima immaculata (Dall, 1927)

Synonyms
- Aclis (Amblyspira) immaculata Dall, 1927; Aclis immaculata Dall, 1927 superseded combination

Species of gastropod

Fusceulima immaculata is a species of sea snail, a marine gastropod mollusk in the family Eulimidae.

== Description ==
The length of the shell attains 3.2 mm, its diameter 1 mm.

(Original description) The minute shell is subcylindrical. It is polished and white. It has a blunt apex and about six nearly flat-sided whorls. The suture is obscure, flatly appressed, having the aspect of being overglazed. The sculpture consists only of nearly imperceptible incremental lines. The base is somewhat prolonged and rounded. The aperture is ovate. The outer lip is thin, produced medially and evenly rounded into a short slightly concave inner lip.

== Distribution ==
This species occurs in the Atlantic Ocean off Fernandina Beach, Florida.
