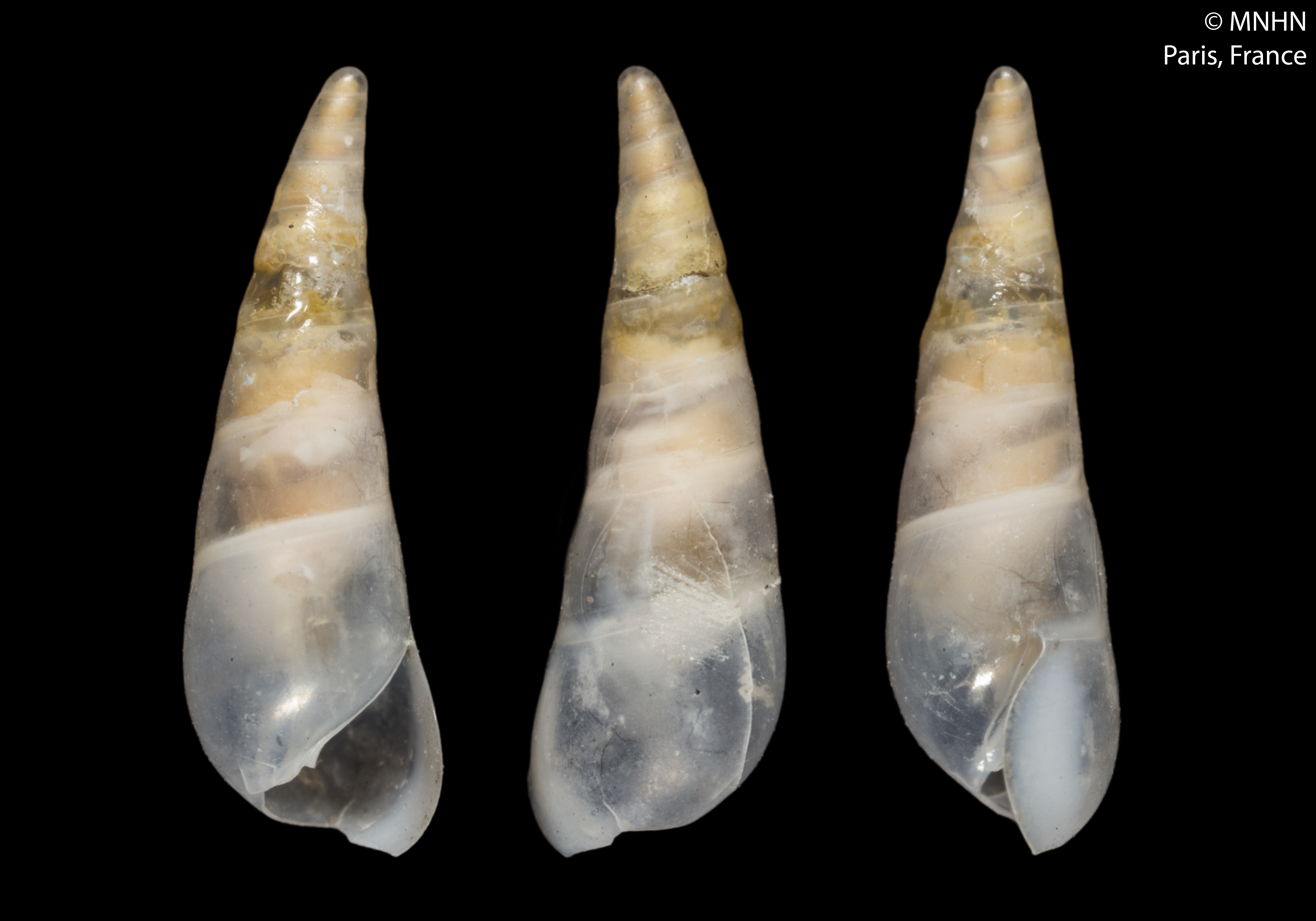

Scientific classification
- Kingdom: Animalia
- Phylum: Mollusca
- Class: Gastropoda
- Subclass: Caenogastropoda
- Order: Littorinimorpha
- Family: Eulimidae
- Genus: Eulitoma
- Species: E. arcus

Binomial name
- Eulitoma arcus Bouchet & Warén, 1986

= Eulitoma arcus =

Species of gastropod

Eulitoma arcus is a species of sea snail, a marine gastropod mollusk in the family Eulimidae.

== Description ==
The length of the shell ranges typically from 4 mm to 7 mm in size. Shells belonging to this species have been obtained at depths of about 750 m below sea level.

== Distribution ==
This species occurs in the following locations:

- European waters (ERMS scope)
- United Kingdom Exclusive Economic Zone
