= Curveulima styla =

Scientific classification
- Kingdom: Animalia
- Phylum: Mollusca
- Class: Gastropoda
- Subclass: Caenogastropoda
- Order: Littorinimorpha
- Family: Eulimidae
- Genus: Curveulima
- Species: C. styla

Binomial name
- Curveulima styla Hoffman, van Heugten & Lavaleye, 2011

Species of gastropod

Curveulima styla is a species of sea snail, a marine gastropod mollusk in the family Eulimidae. The species is one of a number within the genus Curveulima.

== Description ==
The shell measures approximately 4 mm.
