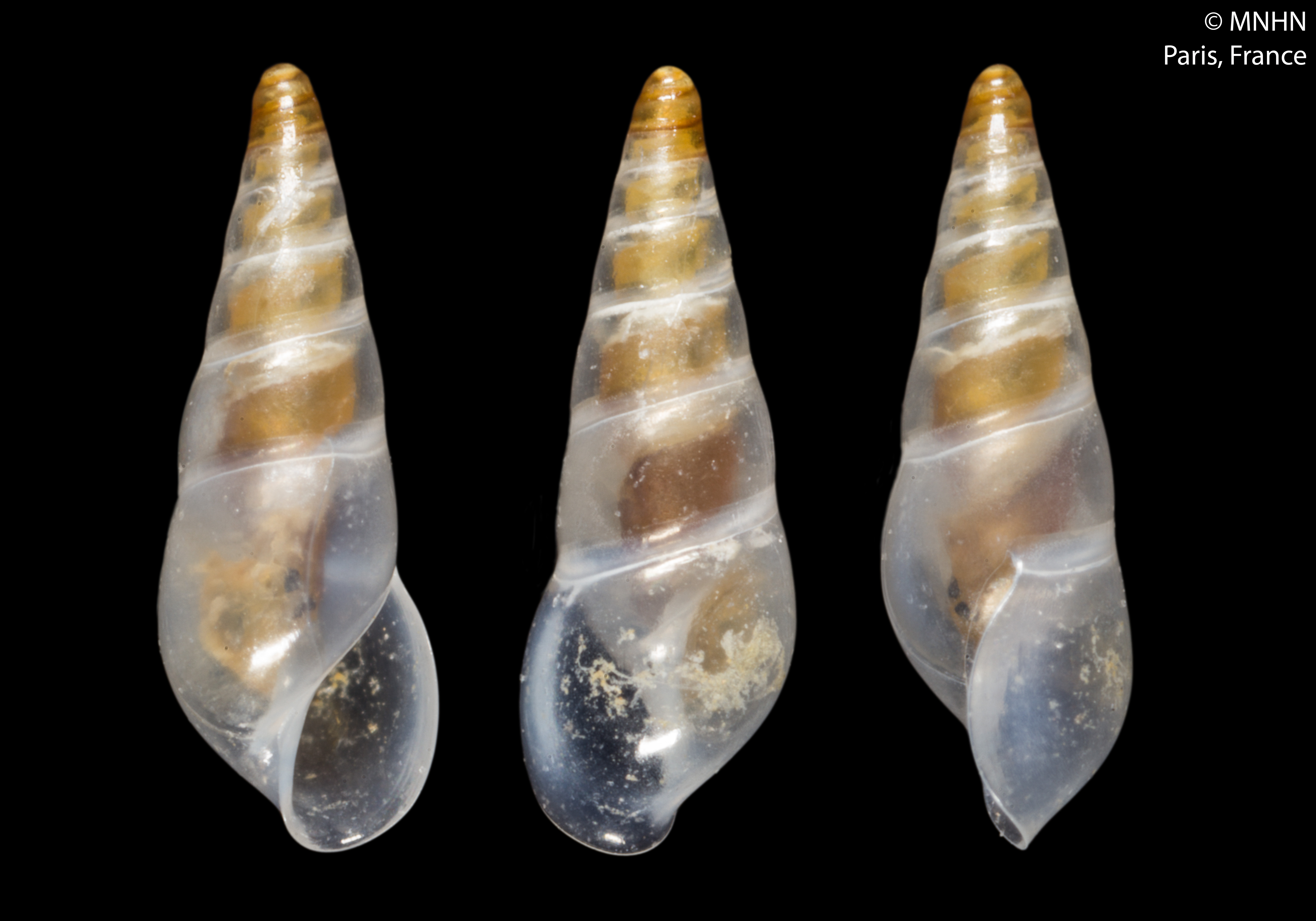
- Shell of Fuscapex cabiochi (holotype at MNHN, Paris)

Scientific classification
- Kingdom: Animalia
- Phylum: Mollusca
- Class: Gastropoda
- Subclass: Caenogastropoda
- Order: Littorinimorpha
- Family: Eulimidae
- Genus: Fuscapex
- Species: F. cabiochi

Binomial name
- Fuscapex cabiochi Bouchet & Warén, 1986

= Fuscapex cabiochi =

Species of gastropod

Fuscapex cabiochi is a species of sea snail, a marine gastropod mollusk in the family Eulimidae.

== Description ==
The shell measures approximately 4 mm in length and can be located at depths of roughly 850 m below sea level.

== Distribution ==
This species occurs in the following locations:

- European waters (ERMS scope)
- United Kingdom Exclusive Economic Zone
