= Amamibalcis =

Scientific classification
- Kingdom: Animalia
- Phylum: Mollusca
- Class: Gastropoda
- Subclass: Caenogastropoda
- Order: Littorinimorpha
- Family: Eulimidae
- Genus: Amamibalcis; Kuroda & Habe, 1950

Genus of gastropods

Amamibalcis is a genus of ectoparasitic sea snails, marine gastropod mollusks in the family Eulimidae.

== Species ==
There are five known species within the genus Amamibalcis:

- Amamibalcis comoxensis (Bartsch, 1917)
- Amamibalcis conspicua (Golikov, 1985)
- Amamibalcis flavipunctata (Habe, 1961)
- Amamibalcis gracillima (G.B. Sowerby II, 1865)
- Amamibalcis kawamurai Kuroda & T. Habe, 1950
- Amamibalcis yessonensis (Rybakov & Yakolev, 1993)
