= Curveulima devians =

Scientific classification
- Kingdom: Animalia
- Phylum: Mollusca
- Class: Gastropoda
- Subclass: Caenogastropoda
- Order: Littorinimorpha
- Family: Eulimidae
- Genus: Curveulima
- Species: C. devians

Binomial name
- Curveulima devians Monterosato, 1884

Synonyms
- Vitreolina devians Monterosato, 1884

Species of gastropod

Curveulima devians is a species of sea snail, a marine gastropod mollusk in the family Eulimidae. The species is one of a number within the genus Curveulima.

== Description ==
The shell measures approximately 4.5 mm.
