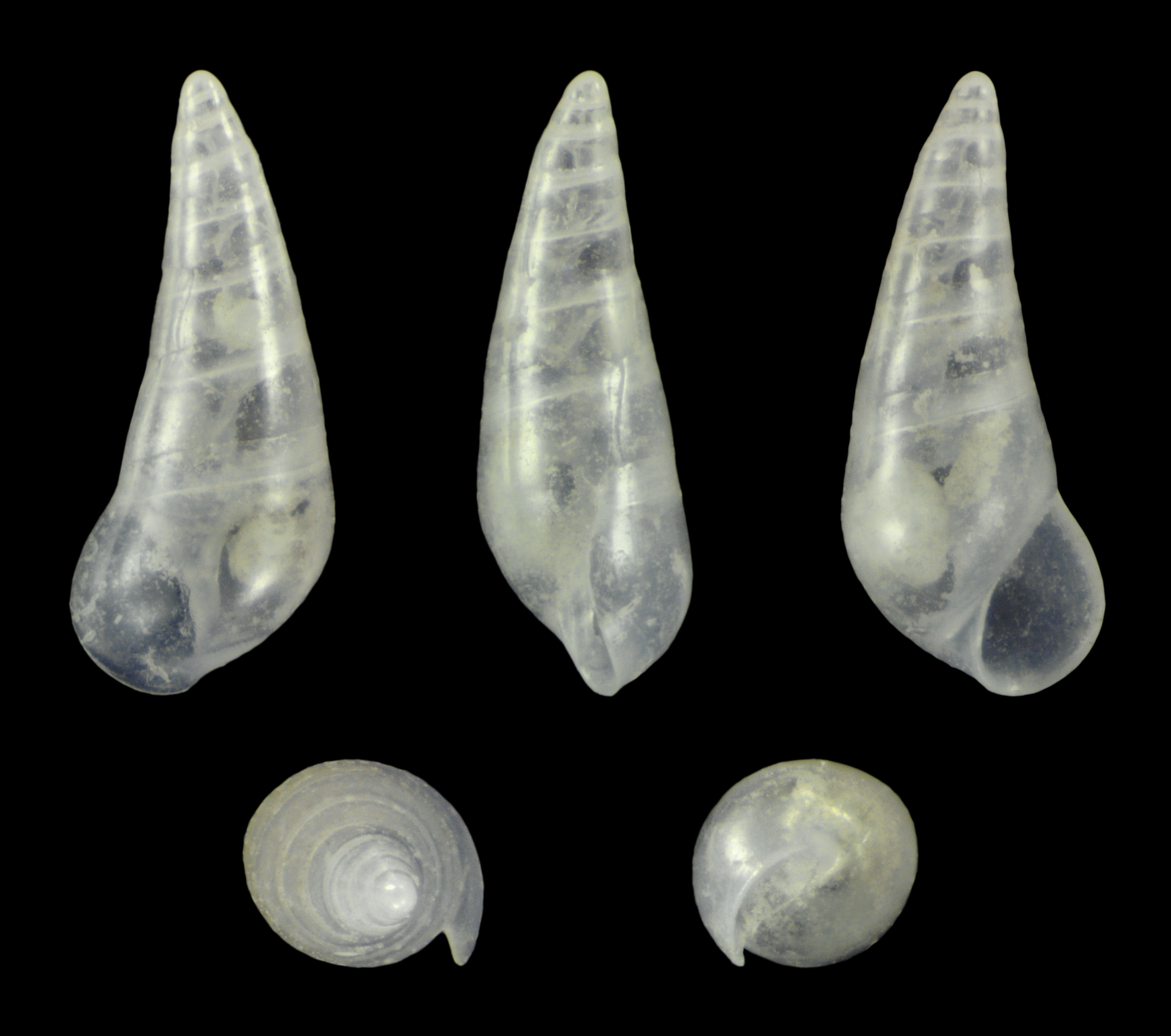

Scientific classification
- Kingdom: Animalia
- Phylum: Mollusca
- Class: Gastropoda
- Subclass: Caenogastropoda
- Order: Littorinimorpha
- Family: Eulimidae
- Genus: Curveulima
- Species: C. dautzenbergi

Binomial name
- Curveulima dautzenbergi (Pallary, 1900)

Synonyms
- Eulima (Vitreolina) dautzenbergi Pallary, 1900; Eulima dautzenbergi Pallary, 1900; Vitreolina dautzenbergi Pallary, 1900

= Curveulima dautzenbergi =

Species of gastropod

Curveulima dautzenbergi is a species of sea snail, a marine gastropod mollusk in the family Eulimidae. The species is one of a number within the genus Curveulima. The species was named in honor of Belgian malacologist, Philippe Dautzenberg (1849-1935).

== Description ==
The shell measures approximately 4 mm.

== Distribution ==
This gastropod is found in marine benthic zones, specifically in the exclusive economic zones of Ireland and the United Kingdom. As a benthic organism, it inhabits the seabed, often burrowing in soft sediments. Its range is not limited to these regions, as related species in the genus Curveulima are widespread in various marine environments.
