= Curveulima komai =

Scientific classification
- Kingdom: Animalia
- Phylum: Mollusca
- Class: Gastropoda
- Subclass: Caenogastropoda
- Order: Littorinimorpha
- Family: Eulimidae
- Genus: Curveulima
- Species: C. komai

Binomial name
- Curveulima komai Habe, 1950

Synonyms
- Balcis komai (Habe, 1950)

Species of gastropod

Curveulima komai is a species of sea snail, a marine gastropod mollusk in the family Eulimidae. The species is one of a number within the genus Curveulima.
