= Sticteulima badia =

Scientific classification
- Kingdom: Animalia
- Phylum: Mollusca
- Class: Gastropoda
- Subclass: Caenogastropoda
- Order: Littorinimorpha
- Family: Eulimidae
- Genus: Sticteulima
- Species: S. badia

Binomial name
- Sticteulima badia (Watson, 1897)

Synonyms
- Eulima badia R. B. Watson, 1897

Species of gastropod

Sticteulima badia is a species of sea snail, a marine gastropod mollusk in the family Eulimidae.
