= Curveulima manifesta =

Scientific classification
- Kingdom: Animalia
- Phylum: Mollusca
- Class: Gastropoda
- Subclass: Caenogastropoda
- Order: Littorinimorpha
- Family: Eulimidae
- Genus: Curveulima
- Species: C. manifesta

Binomial name
- Curveulima manifesta Laseron, 1955

Species of gastropod

Curveulima manifesta is a species of sea snail, a marine gastropod mollusk in the family Eulimidae. The species is one of multiple known to exist within the genus, Curveulima.
