= Sticteulima kawamurai =

Scientific classification
- Kingdom: Animalia
- Phylum: Mollusca
- Class: Gastropoda
- Subclass: Caenogastropoda
- Order: Littorinimorpha
- Family: Eulimidae
- Genus: Sticteulima
- Species: S. kawamurai

Binomial name
- Sticteulima kawamurai (Habe, 1961)

Species of gastropod

Sticteulima kawamurai is a species of sea snail, a marine gastropod mollusk in the family Eulimidae.
