= Curveulima marshalli =

Scientific classification
- Kingdom: Animalia
- Phylum: Mollusca
- Class: Gastropoda
- Subclass: Caenogastropoda
- Order: Littorinimorpha
- Family: Eulimidae
- Genus: Curveulima
- Species: C. marshalli

Binomial name
- Curveulima marshalli Bouchet & Warén, 1986

Species of gastropod

Curveulima marshalli is a species of sea snail, a marine gastropod mollusk in the family Eulimidae. The species is one of a number within the genus Curveulima.

== Description ==
The shell measurements range from 2.5 mm to approximately 4.9 mm.
