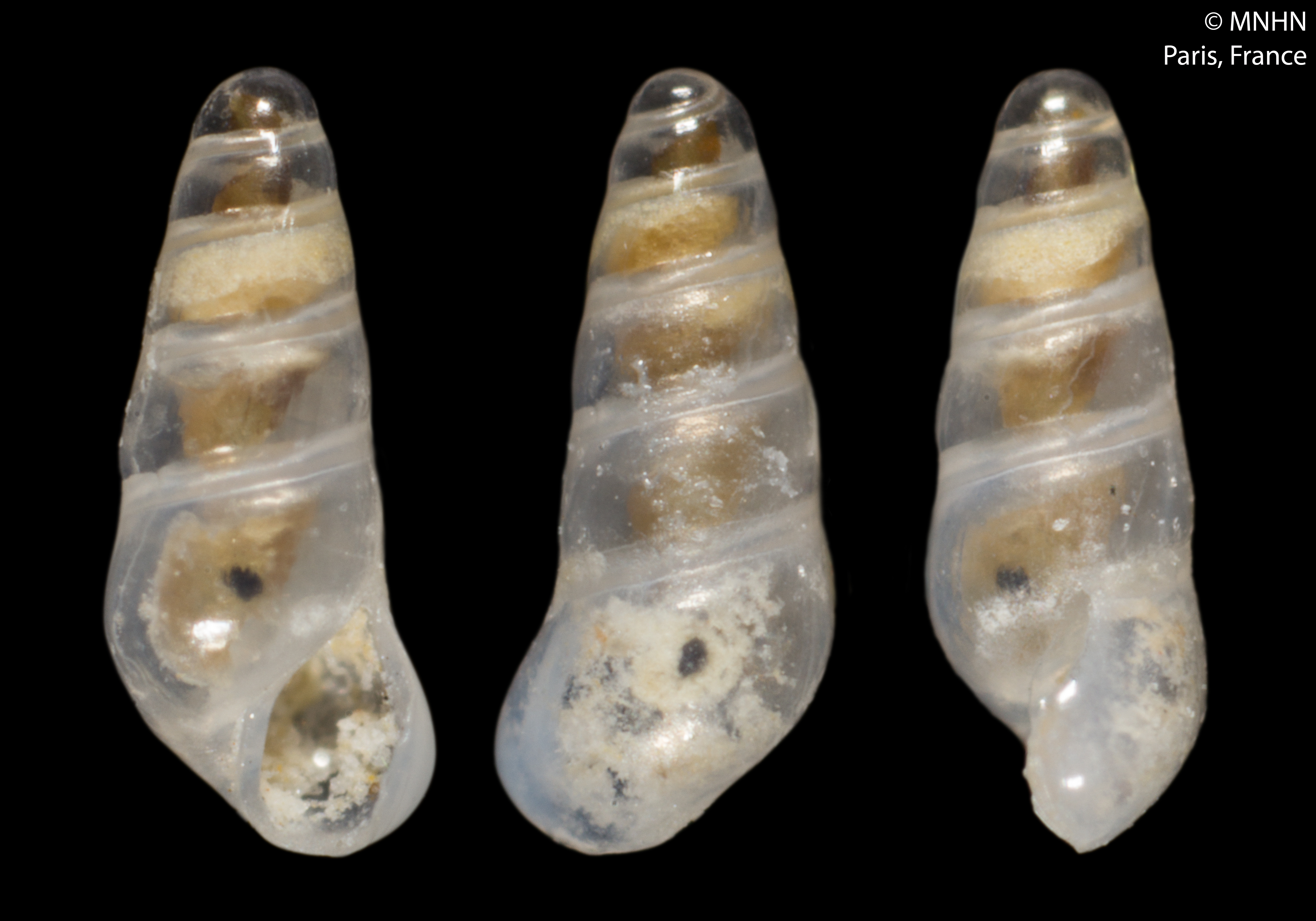
- Shell of Fusceulima projectilabrum (holotype at MNHN, Paris)

Scientific classification
- Kingdom: Animalia
- Phylum: Mollusca
- Class: Gastropoda
- Subclass: Caenogastropoda
- Order: Littorinimorpha
- Family: Eulimidae
- Genus: Fusceulima
- Species: F. projectilabrum

Binomial name
- Fusceulima projectilabrum Bouchet & Warén, 1986

= Fusceulima projectilabrum =

Species of gastropod

Fusceulima projectilabrum is a species of sea snail, a marine gastropod mollusk in the family Eulimidae.

== Distribution ==
This species occurs in the following locations:

- European waters (ERMS scope): in the Atlantic Ocean, west of Brittany, France.

== Description ==
The maximum recorded shell length is 1.8 mm.

== Habitat ==
Minimum recorded depth is 156 m. Maximum recorded depth is 230 m.
