= Fusceulima murdochi =

Scientific classification
- Kingdom: Animalia
- Phylum: Mollusca
- Class: Gastropoda
- Subclass: Caenogastropoda
- Order: Littorinimorpha
- Family: Eulimidae
- Genus: Fusceulima
- Species: F. murdochi

Binomial name
- Fusceulima murdochi Hedley, 1904

Synonyms
- Fusceulima flava Laseron, 1955; Leiostraca murdochi Hedley, 1904

Species of gastropod

Fusceulima murdochi is a species of sea snail, a marine gastropod mollusk in the family Eulimidae.
