= Fuscapex microcostellatus =

Scientific classification
- Kingdom: Animalia
- Phylum: Mollusca
- Class: Gastropoda
- Subclass: Caenogastropoda
- Order: Littorinimorpha
- Family: Eulimidae
- Genus: Fuscapex
- Species: F. microcostellatus

Binomial name
- Fuscapex microcostellatus Bouchet & Warén, 1986

Species of gastropod

Fuscapex microcostellatus is a species of sea snail, a marine gastropod mollusk in the family Eulimidae.

== Distribution ==
This species occurs in the following locations:

- European waters (ERMS scope)
