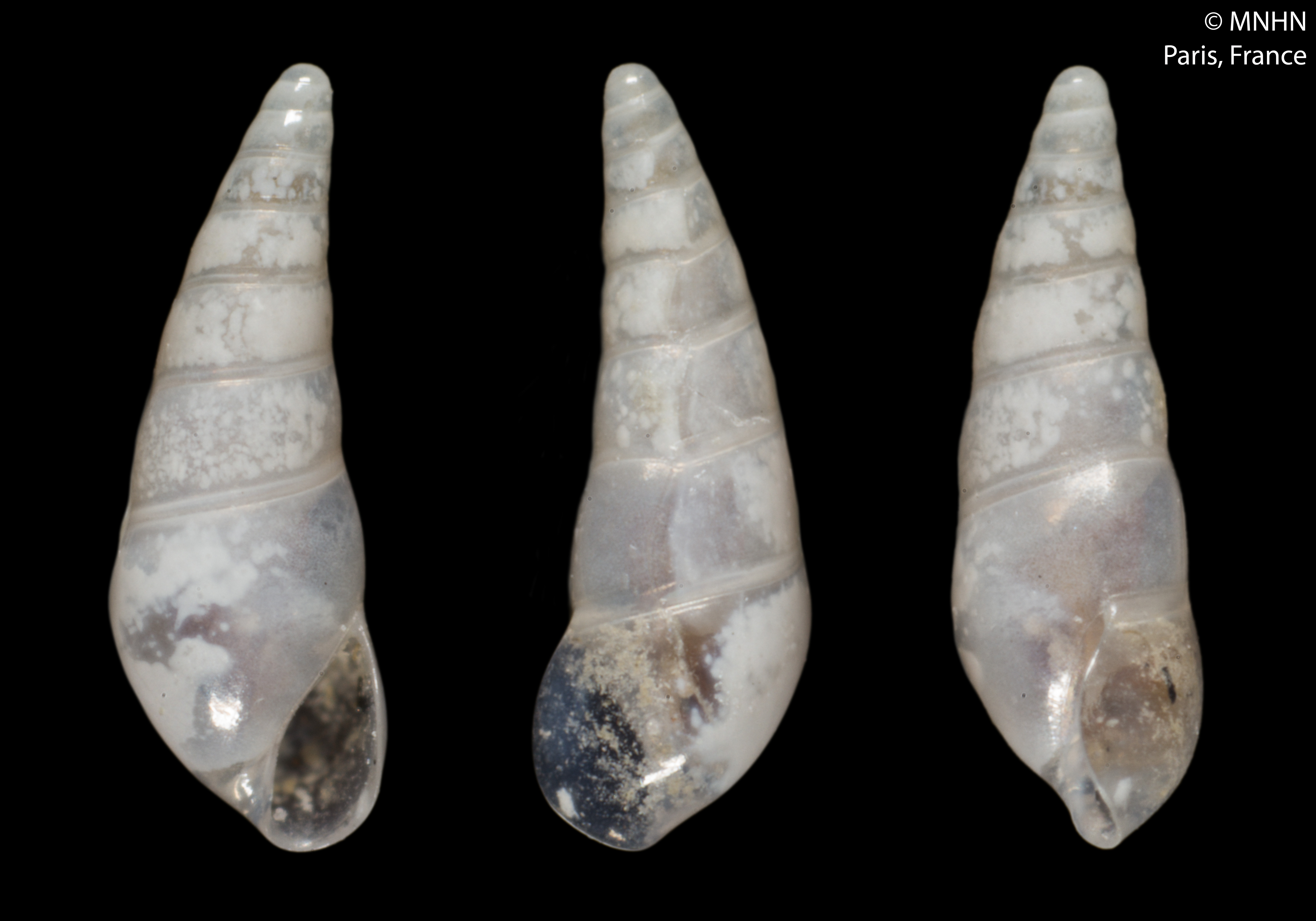
- Shell of Eulitoma obtusiuscula (holotype at MNHN, Paris)

Scientific classification
- Kingdom: Animalia
- Phylum: Mollusca
- Class: Gastropoda
- Subclass: Caenogastropoda
- Order: Littorinimorpha
- Family: Eulimidae
- Genus: Eulitoma
- Species: E. obtusiuscula

Binomial name
- Eulitoma obtusiuscula Bouchet & Warén, 1986

= Eulitoma obtusiuscula =

Species of gastropod

Eulitoma obtusiuscula is a species of sea snail, a marine gastropod mollusk in the family Eulimidae.

== Description ==
The size of the shell ranges from approximately 2 mm to 5 mm in length.

== Distribution ==
This species occurs in the following locations:

- European waters (ERMS scope)
- United Kingdom Exclusive Economic Zone
