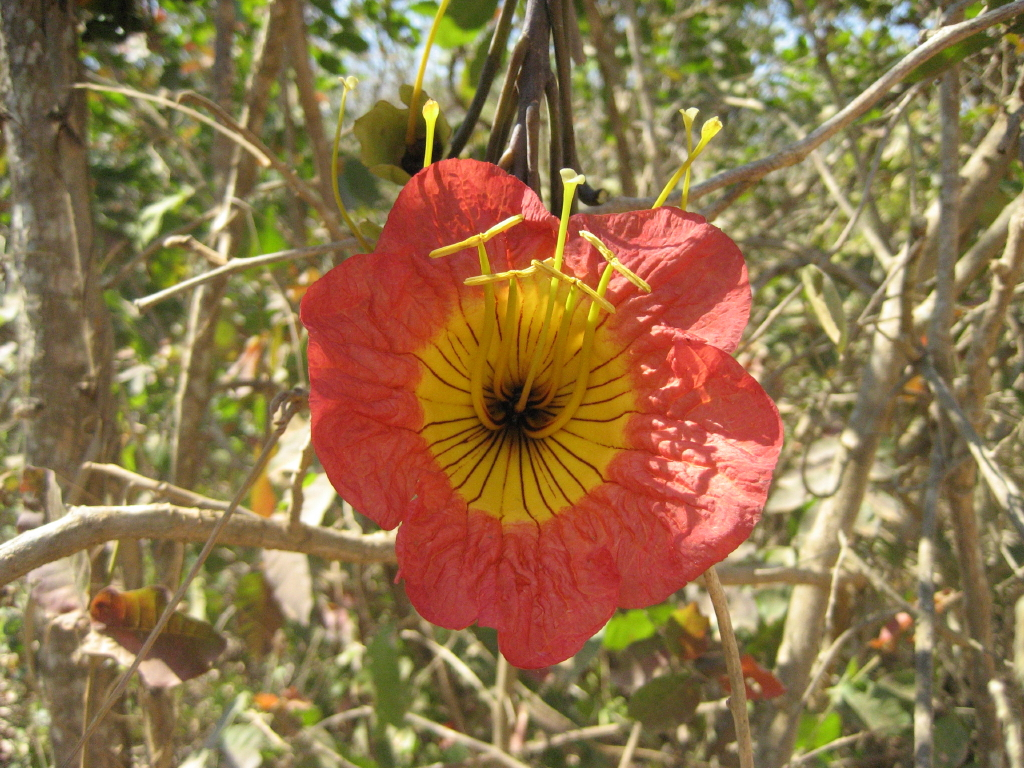
- Fernandoa magnifica

Scientific classification
- Kingdom: Plantae
- Clade: Tracheophytes
- Clade: Angiosperms
- Clade: Eudicots
- Clade: Asterids
- Order: Lamiales
- Family: Bignoniaceae
- Clade: Crescentiina
- Clade: Paleotropical clade
- Genus: Fernandoa; Welw. ex Seem.

Synonyms
- Haplophragma Dop; Hexaneurocarpon Dop; Kigelianthe Baill.; Spathodeopsis Dop; Tisserantodendron Sillans

= Fernandoa =

Genus of flowering plants

Fernandoa is a genus of plants in the family Bignoniaceae; species are found in tropical Africa, India and south-east Asia.

== Species ==
Plants of the World Online includes:

1. Fernandoa abbreviata Bidgood - E Africa
2. Fernandoa adenophylla (Wall. ex G.Don) Steenis - India, SE Asia
3. Fernandoa adolfi-friderici Gilg & Mildbr. - tropical Africa
4. Fernandoa bracteata (Dop) Steenis - Vietnam
5. Fernandoa brilletii (Dop) Steenis - Vietnam
6. Fernandoa coccinea (Scott-Elliot) A.H.Gentry - Madagascar
7. Fernandoa collignonii (Dop) Steenis - Indochina
8. Fernandoa ferdinandi (Welw.) Baill. ex K.Schum. type species as synonym F. superba Welw. ex Seem. - W. Africa
9. Fernandoa guangxiensis D.D.Tao - China
10. Fernandoa lutea (Verdc.) Bidgood - E Africa
11. Fernandoa macrantha (Baker) A.H.Gentry - Madagascar
12. Fernandoa macroloba (Miq.) Steenis - Sumatra
13. Fernandoa madagascariensis (Baker) A.H.Gentry - Madagascar
14. Fernandoa magnifica Seem. - E Africa
15. Fernandoa serrata (Dop) Steenis - Vietnam
