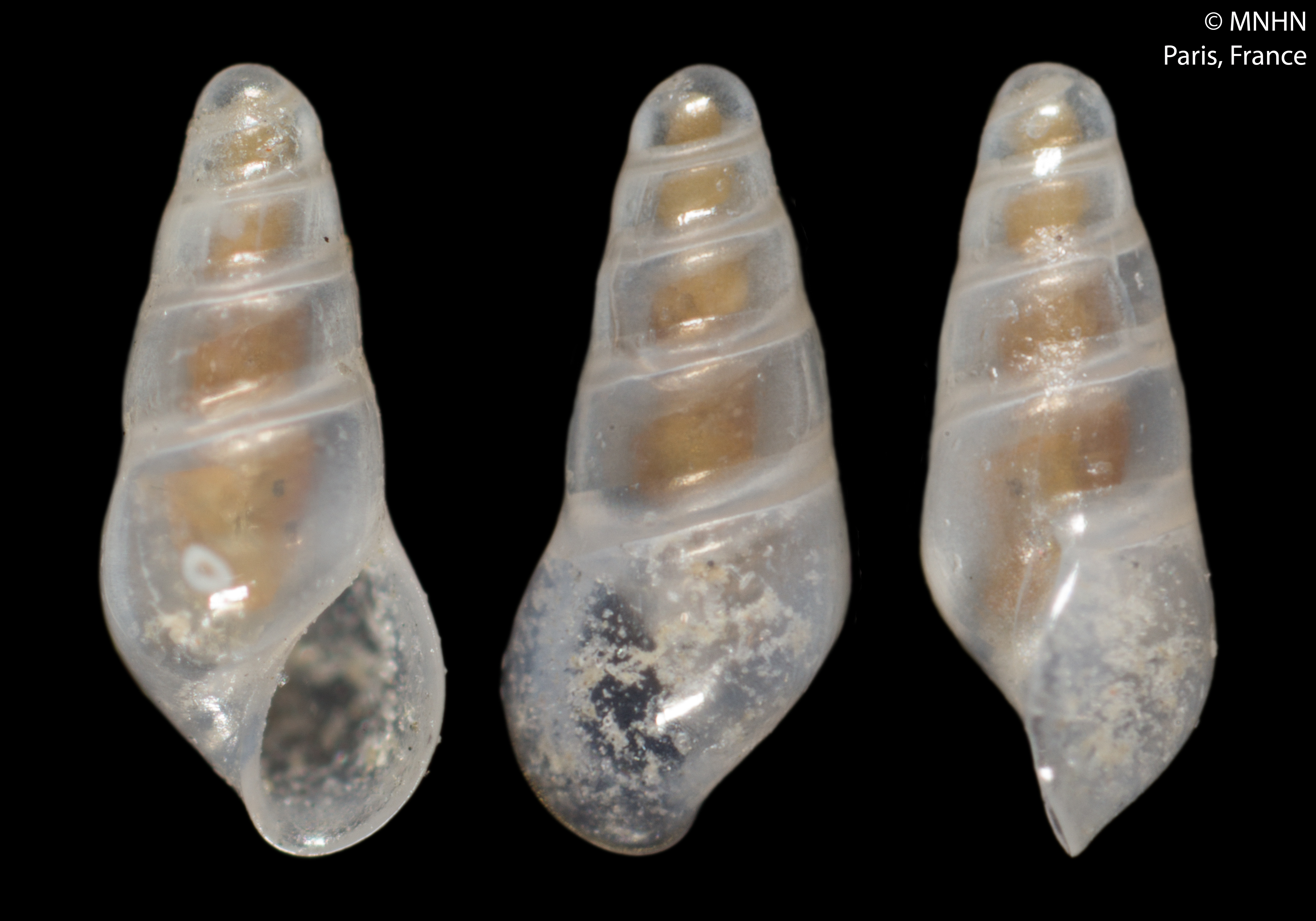

Scientific classification
- Kingdom: Animalia
- Phylum: Mollusca
- Class: Gastropoda
- Subclass: Caenogastropoda
- Order: Littorinimorpha
- Family: Eulimidae
- Genus: Fusceulima
- Species: F. thalassae

Binomial name
- Fusceulima thalassae Bouchet & Warén, 1986

= Fusceulima thalassae =

Species of gastropod

Fusceulima thalassae is a species of sea snail, a marine gastropod mollusk in the family Eulimidae.

== Description ==
The length of the shell measures approximately 2 mm.

== Distribution ==
This species occurs in the following locations:

- European waters (ERMS scope)
- United Kingdom Exclusive Economic Zone
