= Fuscapex ophioacanthicola =

Scientific classification
- Kingdom: Animalia
- Phylum: Mollusca
- Class: Gastropoda
- Subclass: Caenogastropoda
- Order: Littorinimorpha
- Family: Eulimidae
- Genus: Fuscapex
- Species: F. ophioacanthicola

Binomial name
- Fuscapex ophioacanthicola Warén, 1981

Species of gastropod

Fuscapex ophioacanthicola is a species of sea snail, a marine gastropod mollusk in the family Eulimidae.
