= Curveulima litoris =

Curevulima litoris

Scientific classification
- Kingdom: Animalia
- Phylum: Mollusca
- Class: Gastropoda
- Subclass: Caenogastropoda
- Order: Littorinimorpha
- Family: Eulimidae
- Genus: Curveulima
- Species: C. litoris

Binomial name
- Curveulima litoris Laseron, 1955

Species of gastropod

Curveulima litoris is a species of sea snail, a marine gastropod mollusk in the family Eulimidae. The species is one of a number within the genus Curveulima.
