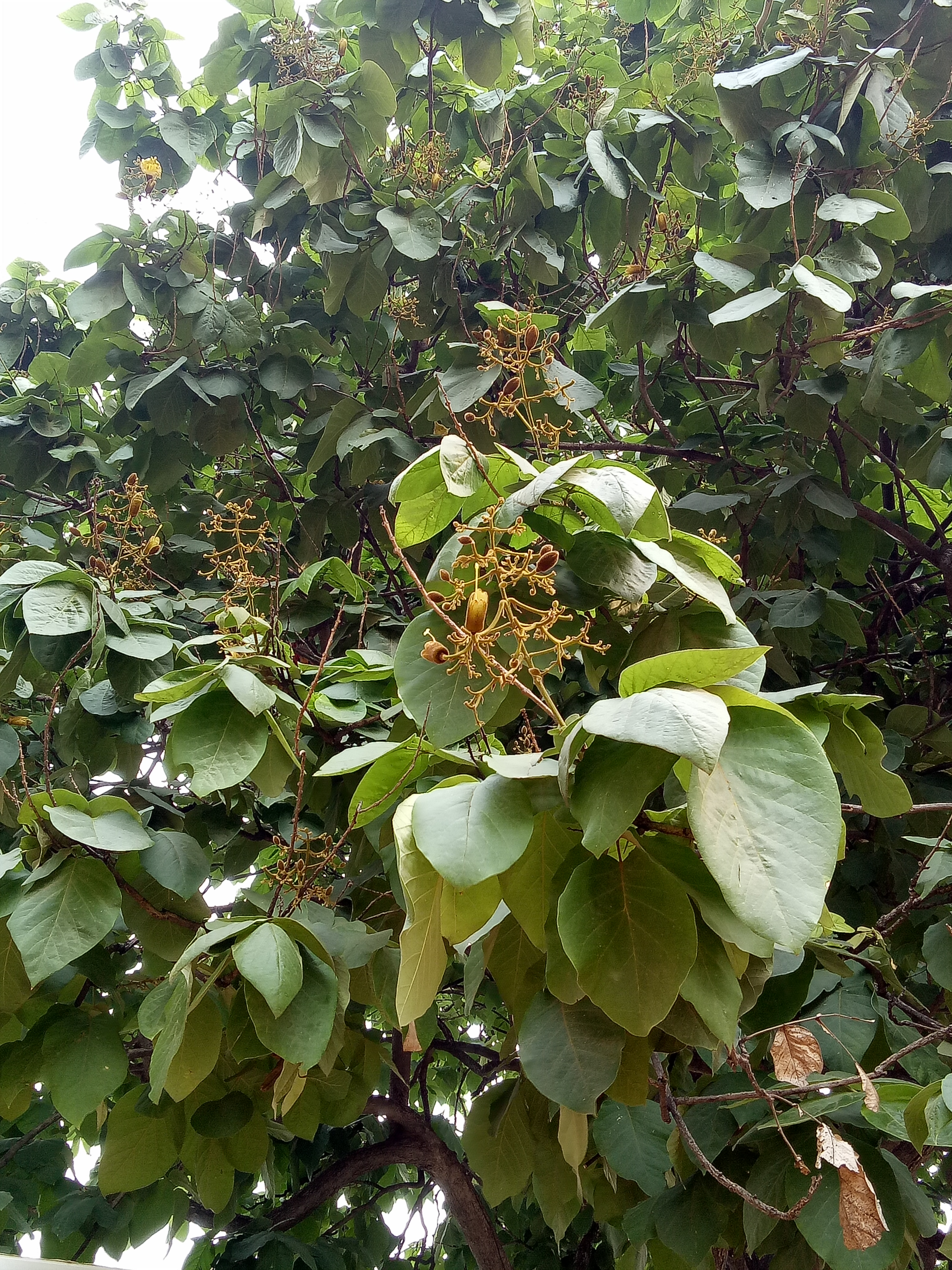
- Growing in Delhi

Scientific classification
- Kingdom: Plantae
- Clade: Tracheophytes
- Clade: Angiosperms
- Clade: Eudicots
- Clade: Asterids
- Order: Lamiales
- Family: Bignoniaceae
- Genus: Fernandoa
- Species: F. adenophylla

Binomial name
- Fernandoa adenophylla (Wall. ex G.Don) Steenis

Synonyms
- Bignonia adenophylla Wall. ex G.Don; Haplophragma adenophyllum (Wall. ex G.Don) Dop; Heterophragma adenophyllum (Wall. ex G.Don) Seem.; Spathodea adenophylla A.DC.

= Fernandoa adenophylla =

Species of flowering plant

Fernandoa adenophylla, synonym Haplophragma adenophyllum, is a species of flowering plant in the family Bignoniaceae that is native to the Andaman Islands, India (Assam and other states), Bangladesh, Myanmar, Cambodia, Laos, Peninsular Malaysia, Thailand and Vietnam. It is commonly known as katsagon, marodphali, petthan, and Karen wood.

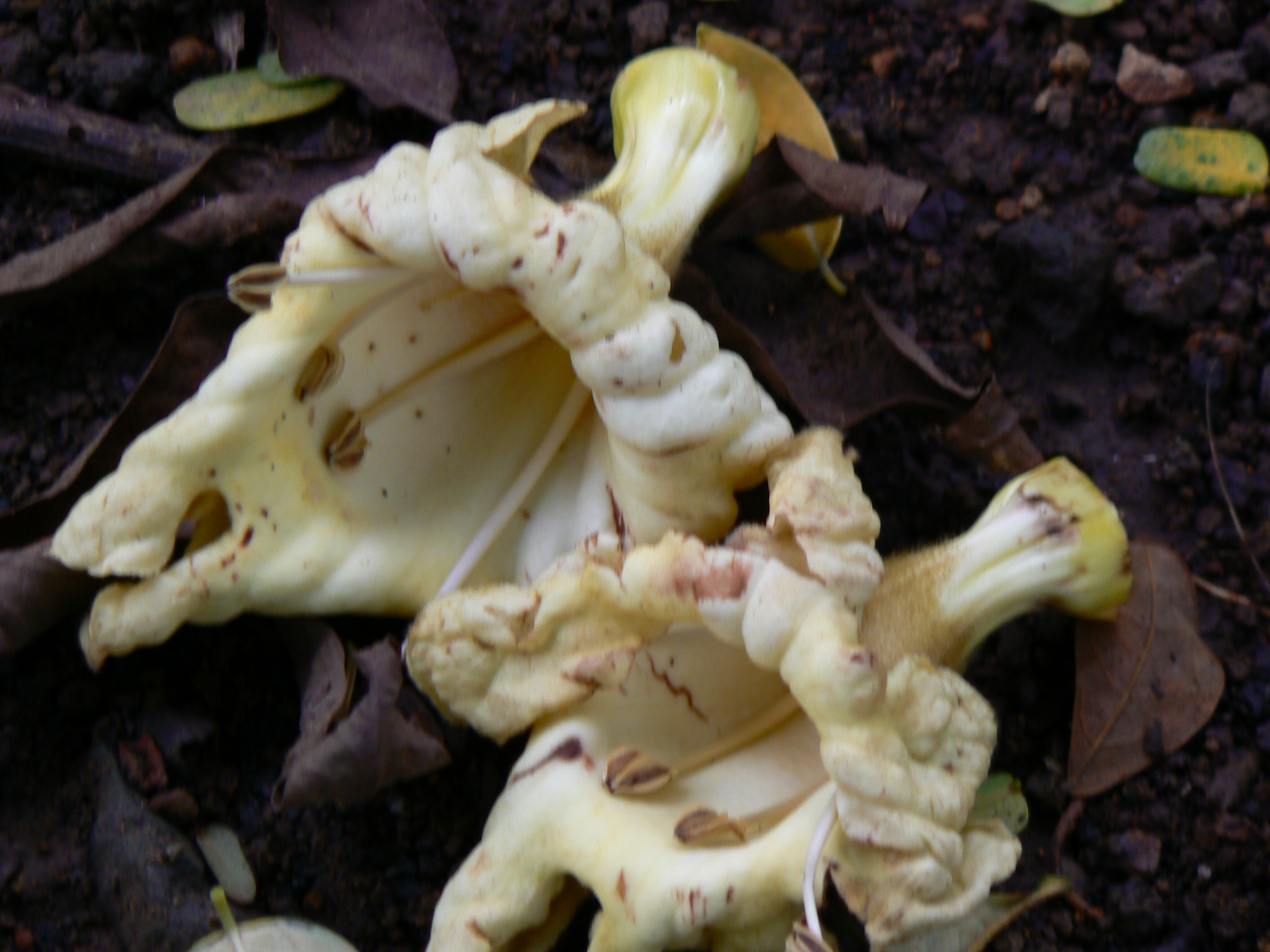
Fallen flowers
