= Fusceulima jacksonensis =

Scientific classification
- Kingdom: Animalia
- Phylum: Mollusca
- Class: Gastropoda
- Subclass: Caenogastropoda
- Order: Littorinimorpha
- Family: Eulimidae
- Genus: Fusceulima
- Species: F. jacksonensis

Binomial name
- Fusceulima jacksonensis Laseron, 1955

Synonyms
- Fusceulima sucina Laseron, 1955

Species of gastropod

Fusceulima jacksonensis is a species of sea snail, which is a marine gastropod mollusk in the family Eulimidae.

== Distribution ==
- Marine
