= Curveulima macrophthalmica =

Scientific classification
- Kingdom: Animalia
- Phylum: Mollusca
- Class: Gastropoda
- Subclass: Caenogastropoda
- Order: Littorinimorpha
- Family: Eulimidae
- Genus: Curveulima
- Species: C. macrophthalmica

Binomial name
- Curveulima macrophthalmica (Warén, 1972)

Species of gastropod

Curveulima macrophthalmica is a species of sea snail, a marine gastropod mollusk in the family Eulimidae.

The shell measures approximately 5 mm. This species occurs in European waters, including the United Kingdom.
