= Curveulima aupouria =

Scientific classification
- Kingdom: Animalia
- Phylum: Mollusca
- Class: Gastropoda
- Subclass: Caenogastropoda
- Order: Littorinimorpha
- Family: Eulimidae
- Genus: Curveulima
- Species: C. aupouria

Binomial name
- Curveulima aupouria Powell, 1937

Synonyms
- Balcis aupouria Powell, 1937

Species of gastropod

Curveulima aupouria is a species of sea snail, a marine gastropod mollusk in the family Eulimidae.
