= Fusceulima inusta =

Scientific classification
- Kingdom: Animalia
- Phylum: Mollusca
- Class: Gastropoda
- Subclass: Caenogastropoda
- Order: Littorinimorpha
- Family: Eulimidae
- Genus: Fusceulima
- Species: F. inusta

Binomial name
- Fusceulima inusta Hedley, 1906

Species of gastropod

Fusceulima inusta is a species of sea snail, a marine gastropod mollusk in the family Eulimidae.
