= Eulitoma insignis =

Scientific classification
- Kingdom: Animalia
- Phylum: Mollusca
- Class: Gastropoda
- Subclass: Caenogastropoda
- Order: Littorinimorpha
- Family: Eulimidae
- Genus: Eulitoma
- Species: E. insignis

Binomial name
- Eulitoma insignis Dautzenberg & Fischer, H., 1896

Species of sea snail

Eulitoma insignis is a species of sea snail, a marine gastropod mollusk in the family Eulimidae.

== Distribution ==
This species occurs in the following locations:

- European waters (ERMS scope)

== Description ==
The maximum recorded shell length is 19 mm.

== Habitat ==
Minimum recorded depth is 774 m. Maximum recorded depth is 774 m.
