= Fusceulima fulva =

Scientific classification
- Kingdom: Animalia
- Phylum: Mollusca
- Class: Gastropoda
- Subclass: Caenogastropoda
- Order: Littorinimorpha
- Family: Eulimidae
- Genus: Fusceulima
- Species: F. fulva

Binomial name
- Fusceulima fulva Watson, 1897

Synonyms
- Eulima fulva Watson, 1897

Species of gastropod

Fusceulima fulva is a species of sea snail, a marine gastropod mollusk in the family Eulimidae.

== Description ==
The shell is minute, measuring an average size of approximately 1.6 mm in length.

== Distribution ==
This species occurs in the following locations:

- European waters (ERMS scope)
