= Fusceulima sordida =

Scientific classification
- Kingdom: Animalia
- Phylum: Mollusca
- Class: Gastropoda
- Subclass: Caenogastropoda
- Order: Littorinimorpha
- Family: Eulimidae
- Genus: Fusceulima
- Species: F. sordida

Binomial name
- Fusceulima sordida Watson, 1897

Synonyms
- Eulima sordida Watson, 1893

Species of gastropod

Fusceulima sordida is a species of sea snail, a marine gastropod mollusk in the family Eulimidae.

== Distribution ==
This species occurs in the following locations:

- European waters (ERMS scope)
