= Fusceulima ignota =

Scientific classification
- Kingdom: Animalia
- Phylum: Mollusca
- Class: Gastropoda
- Subclass: Caenogastropoda
- Order: Littorinimorpha
- Family: Eulimidae
- Genus: Fusceulima
- Species: F. ignota

Binomial name
- Fusceulima ignota Thiele, 1925

Synonyms
- Eulima ignota Thiele, 1925

Species of gastropod

Fusceulima ignota is a species of sea snail, a marine gastropod mollusk in the family Eulimidae.
