= Amamibalcis gracillima =

Scientific classification
- Kingdom: Animalia
- Phylum: Mollusca
- Class: Gastropoda
- Subclass: Caenogastropoda
- Order: Littorinimorpha
- Family: Eulimidae
- Genus: Amamibalcis
- Species: A. gracillima

Binomial name
- Amamibalcis gracillima G.B. Sowerby II, 1865

Synonyms
- Eulima gracillima G.B. Sowerby II, 1865

Species of gastropod

Amamibalcis gracillima is a species of sea snail, a marine gastropod mollusk in the family Eulimidae.
