= Amamibalcis conspicua =

Scientific classification
- Kingdom: Animalia
- Phylum: Mollusca
- Class: Gastropoda
- Subclass: Caenogastropoda
- Order: Littorinimorpha
- Family: Eulimidae
- Genus: Amamibalcis
- Species: A. conspicua

Binomial name
- Amamibalcis conspicua (A. N. Golikov, 1985)

Synonyms
- Balcis conspicua A. N, Golikov, 1985superseded combination; Balcis conspicuus Golikov, 1985

Species of gastropod

Amamibalcis conspicua is a species of sea snail, a marine gastropod mollusk in the family Eulimidae.

== Distribution ==
This species occurs in the Sea of Japan.
