= Fusceulima innotabilis =

Scientific classification
- Kingdom: Animalia
- Phylum: Mollusca
- Class: Gastropoda
- Subclass: Caenogastropoda
- Order: Littorinimorpha
- Family: Eulimidae
- Genus: Fusceulima
- Species: F. innotabilis

Binomial name
- Fusceulima innotabilis Turton, 1932

Synonyms
- Eulima innotabilis Turton, 1932

Species of gastropod

Fusceulima innotabilis is a species of sea snail, a marine gastropod mollusk in the family Eulimidae.
