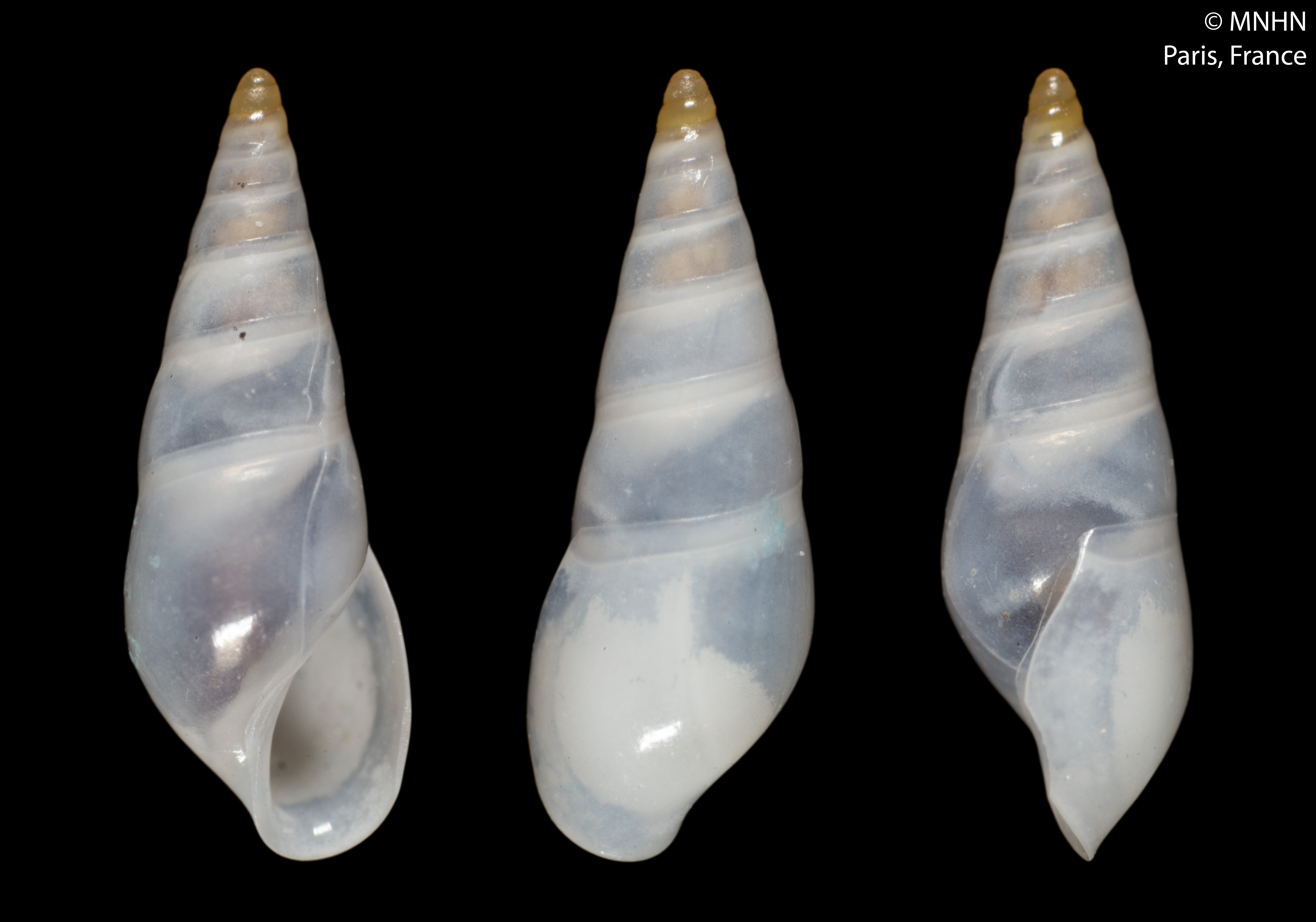
- Shell of Fuscapex talismani (holotype at MNHN, Paris)

Scientific classification
- Kingdom: Animalia
- Phylum: Mollusca
- Class: Gastropoda
- Subclass: Caenogastropoda
- Order: Littorinimorpha
- Family: Eulimidae
- Genus: Fuscapex
- Species: F. talismani

Binomial name
- Fuscapex talismani Bouchet & Warén, 1986

= Fuscapex talismani =

Species of gastropod

Fuscapex talismani is a species of medium-sized sea snail, a marine gastropod mollusk in the family Eulimidae.

== Description ==
The length of the shell attains 5mm, with a diameter of 1.68mm, aperture height of 1.92mm, and breadth of 0.80mm. The shell is conical, whitish semitransparent, with a blunt, yellowish protoconch. The protoconch is 2.3 convex, brownish yellow whorls.

== Distribution ==
This species can be found in the Atlantic Ocean, west off Brittany, France. Found originally from the Azores, and the Bay of Biscay.
