= Curveulima beneitoi =

Scientific classification
- Kingdom: Animalia
- Phylum: Mollusca
- Class: Gastropoda
- Subclass: Caenogastropoda
- Order: Littorinimorpha
- Family: Eulimidae
- Genus: Curveulima
- Species: C. beneitoi

Binomial name
- Curveulima beneitoi Peñas & Rolán, 2006

Species of gastropod

Curveulima beneitoi is a species of sea snail, a marine gastropod mollusc in the family Eulimidae. The species is one of a number within the genus Curveulima.
