= Curveulima icafra =

Scientific classification
- Kingdom: Animalia
- Phylum: Mollusca
- Class: Gastropoda
- Subclass: Caenogastropoda
- Order: Littorinimorpha
- Family: Eulimidae
- Genus: Curveulima
- Species: C. icafra

Binomial name
- Curveulima icafra Bartsch, 1915

Synonyms
- Curveulima quantilla Turton, 1932; Eulima quantilla Turton, 1932; Melanella icafra Bartsch, 1915

Species of gastropod

Curveulima icafra is a species of small sea snail, a marine gastropod mollusk in the family Eulimidae. The species is one of a number within the genus Curveulima.

== Distribution ==
This species is marine.
