= Eulitoma nitens =

Scientific classification
- Kingdom: Animalia
- Phylum: Mollusca
- Class: Gastropoda
- Subclass: Caenogastropoda
- Order: Littorinimorpha
- Family: Eulimidae
- Genus: Eulitoma
- Species: E. nitens

Binomial name
- Eulitoma nitens Laseron, 1955

Species of gastropod

Eulitoma nitens is a species of sea snail, a marine gastropod mollusk in the family Eulimidae.
