= Fusceulima mangonuica =

Scientific classification
- Kingdom: Animalia
- Phylum: Mollusca
- Class: Gastropoda
- Subclass: Caenogastropoda
- Order: Littorinimorpha
- Family: Eulimidae
- Genus: Fusceulima
- Species: F. mangonuica

Binomial name
- Fusceulima mangonuica Powell, 1940

Synonyms
- Eulima mangonuica Powell, 1940

Species of gastropod

Fusceulima mangonuica is a species of sea snail, a marine gastropod mollusk in the family Eulimidae.
