= Amamibalcis yessonensis =

Scientific classification
- Kingdom: Animalia
- Phylum: Mollusca
- Class: Gastropoda
- Subclass: Caenogastropoda
- Order: Littorinimorpha
- Family: Eulimidae
- Genus: Amamibalcis
- Species: A. yessonensis

Binomial name
- Amamibalcis yessonensis Rybakov & Yakovlev, 1993

Species of gastropod

Amamibalcis yessonensis is a species of sea snail, a marine gastropod mollusk in the family Eulimidae.
