= Curveulima indiscreta =

Scientific classification
- Kingdom: Animalia
- Phylum: Mollusca
- Class: Gastropoda
- Subclass: Caenogastropoda
- Order: Littorinimorpha
- Family: Eulimidae
- Genus: Curveulima
- Species: C. indiscreta

Binomial name
- Curveulima indiscreta Tate, 1898

Synonyms
- Eulima indiscreta Tate, 1898

Species of gastropod

Curveulima indiscreta is a species of sea snail, a marine gastropod mollusk in the family Eulimidae. The species is one of a number within the genus Curveulima.
