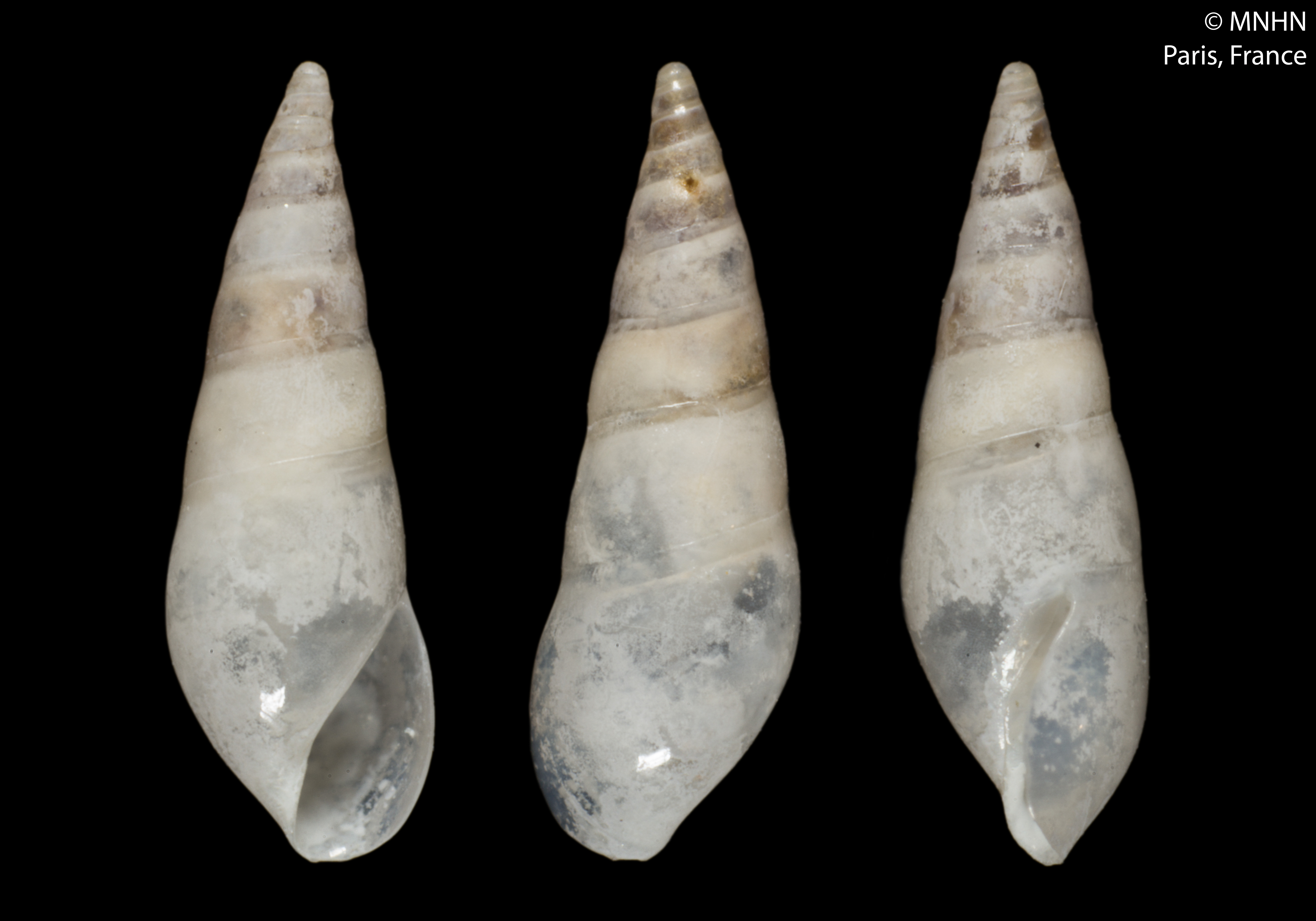
- Shell of Curveulima obliquistoma (holotype at MNHN, Paris)

Scientific classification
- Kingdom: Animalia
- Phylum: Mollusca
- Class: Gastropoda
- Subclass: Caenogastropoda
- Order: Littorinimorpha
- Family: Eulimidae
- Genus: Curveulima
- Species: C. obliquistoma

Binomial name
- Curveulima obliquistoma Bouchet & Warén, 1986

= Curveulima obliquistoma =

Species of gastropod

Curveulima obliquistoma is a species of sea snail, a marine gastropod mollusk in the family Eulimidae. The species is one of a number within the genus Curveulima.

== Description ==
The length of the shell attains 4 mm.

== Distribution ==
This species occurs in the following locations:

- European waters (ERMS scope); in the Atlantic Ocean off between the isles Pico and Saint-George.
