= Curveulima abrupta =

Scientific classification
- Kingdom: Animalia
- Phylum: Mollusca
- Class: Gastropoda
- Subclass: Caenogastropoda
- Order: Littorinimorpha
- Family: Eulimidae
- Genus: Curveulima
- Species: C. abrupta

Binomial name
- Curveulima abrupta Laseron, 1955

Species of gastropod

Curveulima abrupta is a species of sea snail, a marine gastropod mollusk in the family Eulimidae. The species is one of a number within the genus Curveulima. It was described in 1955.

== Distribution ==
This marine species is endemic to Australia and occurs off New South Wales.
