= Fusceulima asser =

Scientific classification
- Kingdom: Animalia
- Phylum: Mollusca
- Class: Gastropoda
- Subclass: Caenogastropoda
- Order: Littorinimorpha
- Family: Eulimidae
- Genus: Fusceulima
- Species: F. asser

Binomial name
- Fusceulima asser Bartsch, 1915

Synonyms
- Melanella asser Bartsch, 1915

Species of gastropod

Fusceulima asser is a species of sea snail, a marine gastropod mollusk in the family Eulimidae.
