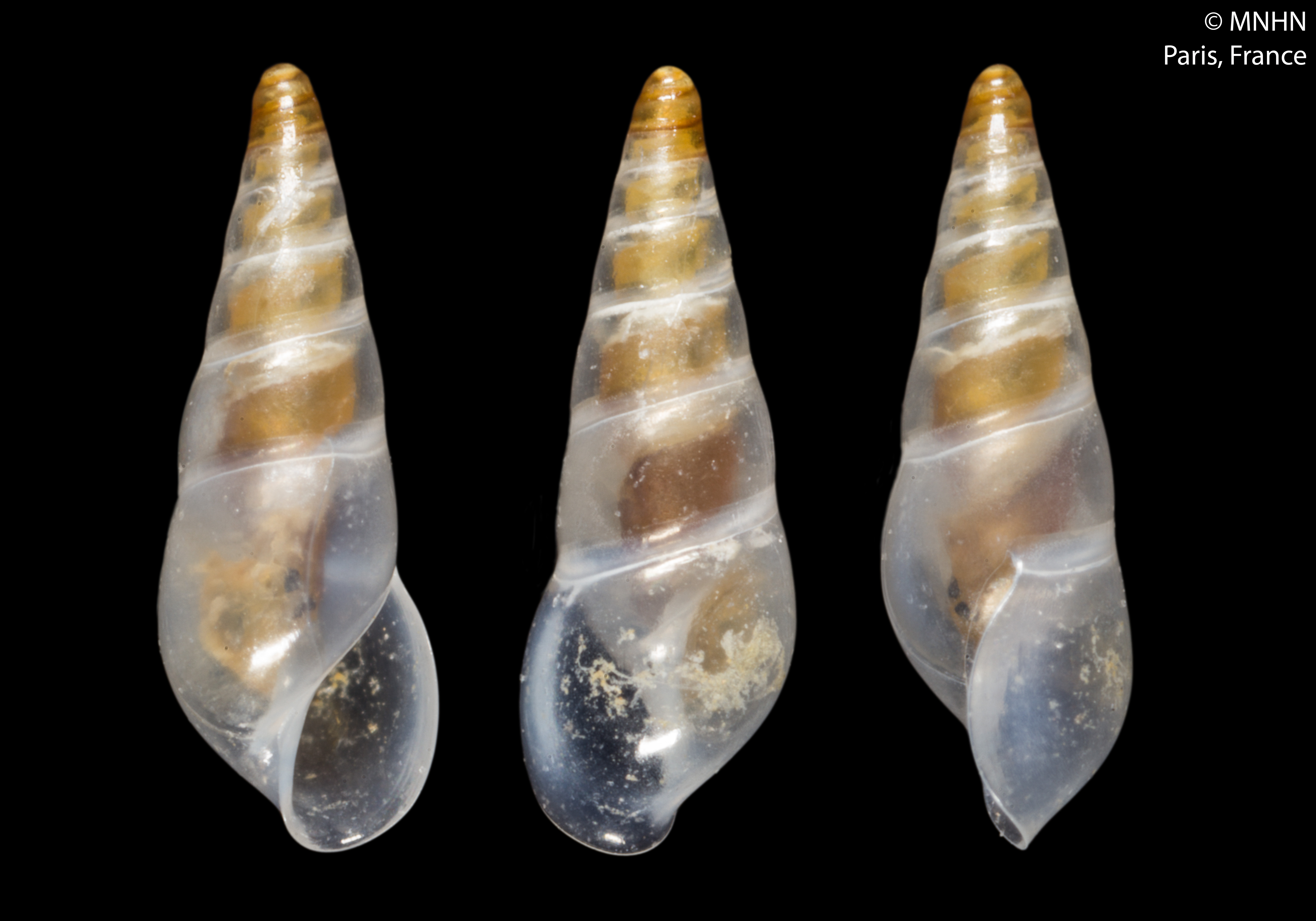
- Shell of Fuscapex cabiochi

Scientific classification
- Kingdom: Animalia
- Phylum: Mollusca
- Class: Gastropoda
- Subclass: Caenogastropoda
- Order: Littorinimorpha
- Superfamily: Vanikoroidea
- Family: Eulimidae
- Genus: Fuscapex; Warén, 1981

Type species
- Fuscapex ophioacanthicola Warén, 1981

= Fuscapex =

Genus of gastropods

Fuscapex is a genus of sea snails, marine gastropod mollusks in the family Eulimidae.

== Species ==
Species within this genus include the following:

- Fuscapex baptocephalus (Dautzenberg & Fischer., 1896)
- Fuscapex cabiochi (Bouchet & Warén, 1986)
- Fuscapex major (Bouchet & Warén, 1986)
- Fuscapex microcostellatus (Bouchet & Warén, 1986)
- Fuscapex ophioacanthicola (Warén, 1981)
- Fuscapex talismani (Bouchet & Warén, 1986)

Species brought into synonymy

- Fuscapex microcostellata Bouchet & Warén, 1986: synonym of Fuscapex microcostellatus Bouchet & Warén, 1986
