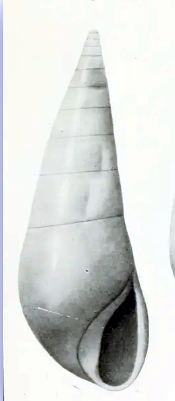
- Shell of Amamibalcis comoxensis (original image)

Scientific classification
- Kingdom: Animalia
- Phylum: Mollusca
- Class: Gastropoda
- Subclass: Caenogastropoda
- Order: Littorinimorpha
- Family: Eulimidae
- Genus: Amamibalcis
- Species: A. comoxensis

Binomial name
- Amamibalcis comoxensis (Bartsch, 1917)

Synonyms
- Melanella (Balcis) comoxensis Bartsch, 1917

= Amamibalcis comoxensis =

Species of gastropod

Amamibalcis comoxensis is a species of sea snail, a marine gastropod mollusk in the family Eulimidae.

== Description ==
The length of the shell attains 7.1 mm, its diameter 3 mm.

(Original description) The shell is broadly conic and has a double flexure, the early portion being turned back while the later portion is turned to the right. It is bluish-white and polished.

The shell contains 11 whorls. The first two whorls are well rounded and are separated by a constricted suture, while the rest are slightly rounded — a little more so on the convex side than on the concave side. They are marked by exceedingly fine lines of growth, by microscopic spiral striations, and by occasional varicial streaks, which appear as an opaque spot in the shell. The suture is scarcely defined. The posterior limit of the inside of the whorls shines through the substance of the shell and appears as a false suture. The periphery of the body whorl is slightly angulated, and the base is short and strongly rounded.

The aperture is broadly oval and rather short, with its posterior angle acute. The outer lip is protracted at the periphery, while the inner lip is short and slightly curved, strongly reflected and appressed to the base. The parietal wall is covered with a thick callus.

== Distribution ==
This marine species is found in the eastern Pacific Ocean off the west coast of the United States and Canada.
