= Curveulima pinguicula =

Scientific classification
- Kingdom: Animalia
- Phylum: Mollusca
- Class: Gastropoda
- Subclass: Caenogastropoda
- Order: Littorinimorpha
- Family: Eulimidae
- Genus: Curveulima
- Species: C. pinguicula

Binomial name
- Curveulima pinguicula A. Adams, 1861

Synonyms
- Balcis pinguicula A. Adams, 1861

Species of gastropod

Curveulima pinguicula is a species of sea snail, a marine gastropod mollusk in the family Eulimidae. The species is one of a number within the genus Curveulima.
