= Fusceulima lutea =

Scientific classification
- Kingdom: Animalia
- Phylum: Mollusca
- Class: Gastropoda
- Subclass: Caenogastropoda
- Order: Littorinimorpha
- Family: Eulimidae
- Genus: Fusceulima
- Species: F. lutea

Binomial name
- Fusceulima lutea Turton, 1832

Synonyms
- Eulima lutea Turton, 1932

Species of gastropod

Fusceulima lutea is a species of sea snail, a marine gastropod mollusk in the family Eulimidae.
