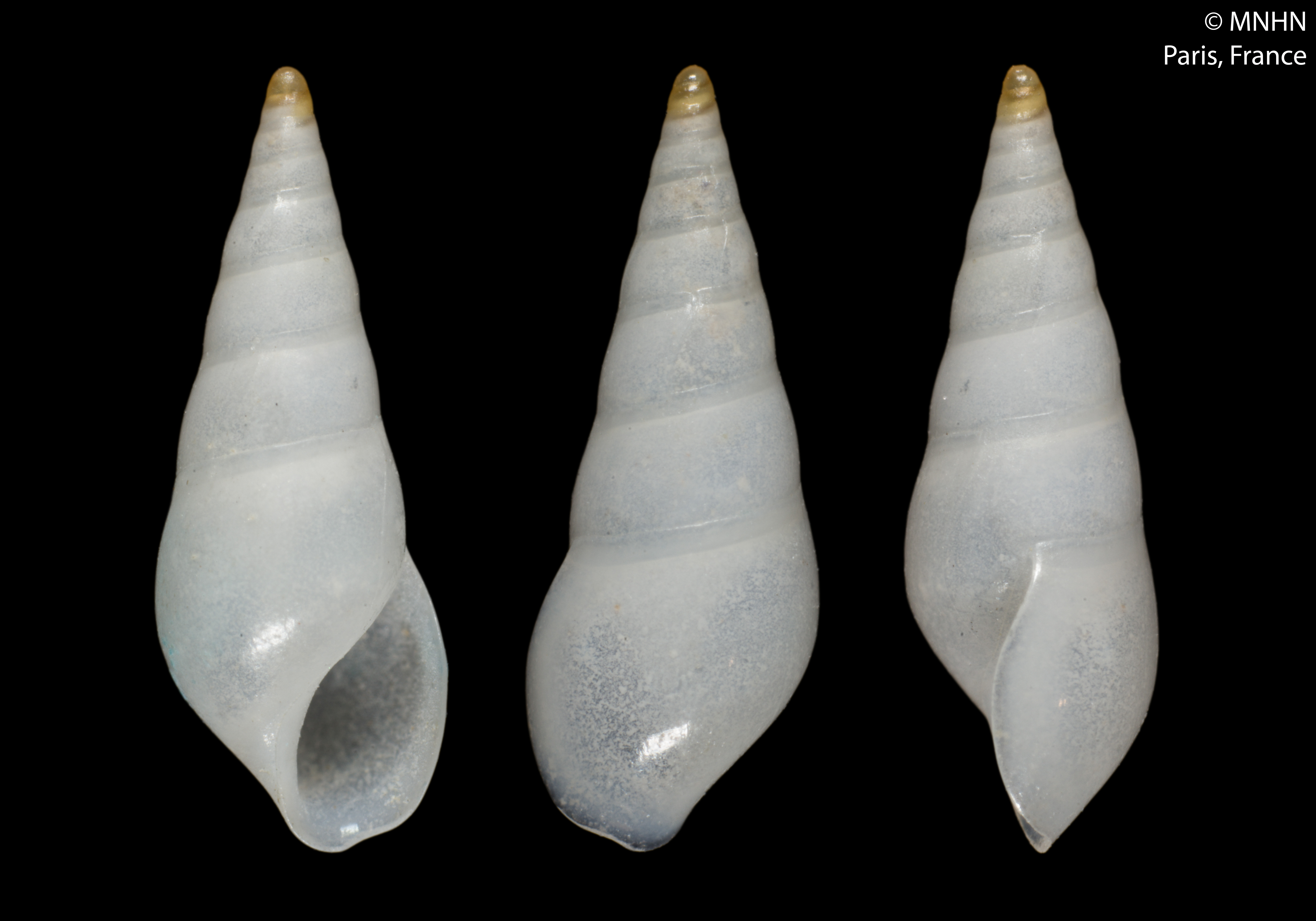
- Shell of Fuscapex major (holotype at MNHN, Paris)

Scientific classification
- Kingdom: Animalia
- Phylum: Mollusca
- Class: Gastropoda
- Subclass: Caenogastropoda
- Order: Littorinimorpha
- Family: Eulimidae
- Genus: Fuscapex
- Species: F. major

Binomial name
- Fuscapex major Bouchet & Warén, 1986

Synonyms
- Fusceulima major (Bouchet & Warén, 1986)

= Fuscapex major =

Species of gastropod

Fuscapex major is a species of sea snail, a marine gastropod mollusk in the family Eulimidae.

== Description ==
The length of the shell is 6.2mm.

== Distribution ==
This species occurs in the following locations:

- European waters (ERMS scope): off the Azores.
