= Melanella obtusa =

Scientific classification
- Kingdom: Animalia
- Phylum: Mollusca
- Class: Gastropoda
- Subclass: Caenogastropoda
- Order: Littorinimorpha
- Family: Eulimidae
- Genus: Melanella
- Species: M. obtusa

Binomial name
- Melanella obtusa (Laseron, 1955)

Synonyms
- Curveulima obtusa Laseron, 1955

Species of gastropod

Melanella obtusa is a species of sea snail, a marine gastropod mollusk in the family Eulimidae.

== Description ==
The approximate length of the shell is 4.5 mm and the width is 1.7 mm.

== Distribution ==
This marine species is endemic to Australia and occurs off New South Wales, Queensland, South Australia, Tasmania and Victoria
