= Amamibalcis flavipunctata =

Scientific classification
- Kingdom: Animalia
- Phylum: Mollusca
- Class: Gastropoda
- Subclass: Caenogastropoda
- Order: Littorinimorpha
- Family: Eulimidae
- Genus: Amamibalcis
- Species: A. flavipunctata

Binomial name
- Amamibalcis flavipunctata Habe, 1961

Synonyms
- Curveulima flavipunctata Habe, 1961

Species of gastropod

Amamibalcis flavipunctata is a species of sea snail, a marine gastropod mollusk in the family Eulimidae.
