= Fusceulima castanea =

Scientific classification
- Kingdom: Animalia
- Phylum: Mollusca
- Class: Gastropoda
- Subclass: Caenogastropoda
- Order: Littorinimorpha
- Family: Eulimidae
- Genus: Fusceulima
- Species: F. castanea

Binomial name
- Fusceulima castanea Laseron, 1955

Synonyms
- Eulitoma castanea Laseron, 1955

Species of gastropod

Fusceulima castanea is a species of sea snail, a marine gastropod mollusk in the family Eulimidae.
