= Fernandoa lutea =

Conservation status
- Critically Endangered (IUCN 3.1)

Scientific classification
- Kingdom: Plantae
- Clade: Tracheophytes
- Clade: Angiosperms
- Clade: Eudicots
- Clade: Asterids
- Order: Lamiales
- Family: Bignoniaceae
- Genus: Fernandoa
- Species: F. lutea

Binomial name
- Fernandoa lutea (Verdc.) Bidgood

Species of flowering plant

Fernandoa lutea is a species of plant in the family Bignoniaceae. It is endemic to Tanzania. It is threatened by habitat loss.
