= Melanella kermadecensis =

- Shell of Melanella kermadecensis (original image)

Scientific classification
- Kingdom: Animalia
- Phylum: Mollusca
- Class: Gastropoda
- Subclass: Caenogastropoda
- Order: Littorinimorpha
- Family: Eulimidae
- Genus: Melanella
- Species: M. kermadecensis

Binomial name
- Melanella kermadecensis W. R. B. Oliver, 1915

Synonyms
- Sticteulima kermadecensis (W. R. B. Oliver, 1915)

Species of gastropod

Melanella kermadecensis is a species of sea snail, a marine gastropod mollusk in the family Eulimidae.

== Description ==
(Original description) The shell is subulate with a blunt apex. The right side is nearly straight, while the left side is slightly curved outwards. There are 6 flat whorls, and the suture is scarcely distinguishable. The aperture is ovate and not much produced, and the outer lip is thick. Overall, the shell is smooth, white, and shining, with a height of 2.8 mm and a diameter of 0.9 mm.

== Distribution ==
This marine species occurs off the Kermadec Islands and is endemic to New Zealand; found at depths between 10 m and 45 m.
