= Eulitoma nishimurai =

Scientific classification
- Kingdom: Animalia
- Phylum: Mollusca
- Class: Gastropoda
- Subclass: Caenogastropoda
- Order: Littorinimorpha
- Family: Eulimidae
- Genus: Eulitoma
- Species: E. nishimurai

Binomial name
- Eulitoma nishimurai (Habe, 1958à

Synonyms
- Curveulima nishimurai Habe, 1958; Vitreolina nishimurai Habe, 1958

Species of gastropod

Eulitoma nishimurai is a species of sea snail, a marine gastropod mollusk in the family Eulimidae. The species is one of a number within the genus Eulitoma.
