= Sticteulima richteri =

Scientific classification
- Kingdom: Animalia
- Phylum: Mollusca
- Class: Gastropoda
- Subclass: Caenogastropoda
- Order: Littorinimorpha
- Family: Eulimidae
- Genus: Sticteulima
- Species: S. richteri

Binomial name
- Sticteulima richteri Engl, 1997

Synonyms
- Fusceulima richteri (Engl, 1997)

Species of gastropod

Sticteulima richteri is a species of ectoparasitic sea snail, a marine gastropod mollusk in the family Eulimidae.

== Distribution ==
This species occurs in the Atlantic Ocean off the Canary Islands, Madeira, Cape Verde, Savage Islands and Angola.
