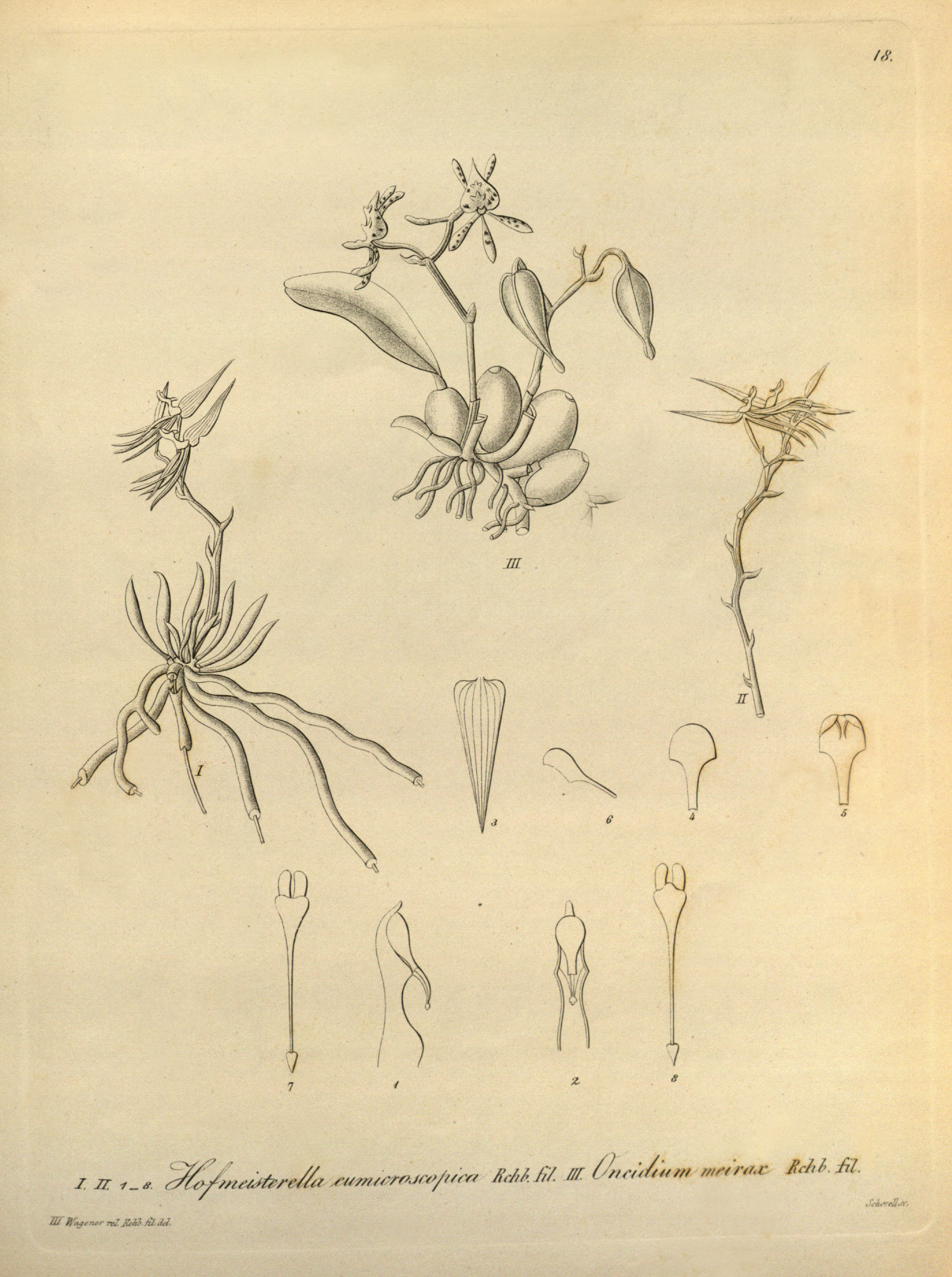
- Hofmeisterella eumicroscopica (left)

Scientific classification
- Kingdom: Plantae
- Clade: Tracheophytes
- Clade: Angiosperms
- Clade: Monocots
- Order: Asparagales
- Family: Orchidaceae
- Subfamily: Epidendroideae
- Tribe: Cymbidieae
- Subtribe: Oncidiinae
- Genus: Hofmeisterella; Rchb.f.

Type species
- Hofmeisterella eumicroscopica (Rchb. f.) Rchb.f.

Synonyms
- Hofmeistera Rchb.f.

= Hofmeisterella =

Genus of orchids

Hofmeisterella is a genus of orchids native to South America. Two species are known:

- Hofmeisterella eumicroscopica (Rchb.f.) Rchb.f. in W.G. Walpers (1852) - Venezuela, Colombia, Ecuador, Peru, Bolivia
- Hofmeisterella falcata (Linden & Rchb.f.) Nauray & A.Galán (2009) - Colombia

The genus was named by Heinrich Gustav Reichenbach for W. Hoffmeister, a German botany professor. This miniature, epiphytic orchid occurs in cool to cold habitats in mountainous rain forests at heights between 1600 and 2400 m. This is a stemless plant with fleshy, terete leaves. The axillary inflorescence is erect to arcuate. It gives rise to few to several, successively flowering, relatively large, yellow flowers with a purple shine at their base.
