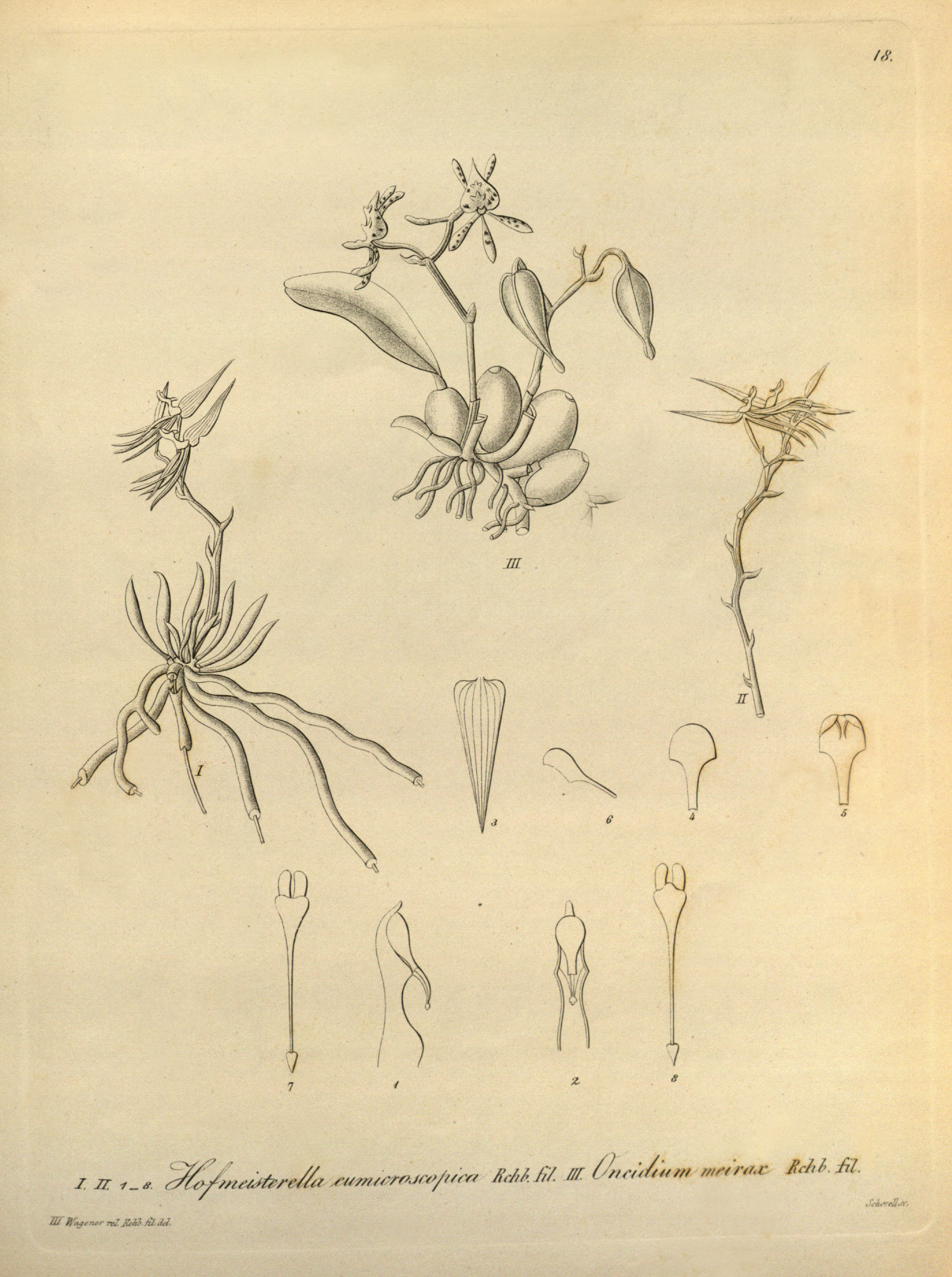
- I, II Hofmeisterella eumicroscopica

Scientific classification
- Kingdom: Plantae
- Clade: Tracheophytes
- Clade: Angiosperms
- Clade: Monocots
- Order: Asparagales
- Family: Orchidaceae
- Subfamily: Epidendroideae
- Genus: Hofmeisterella
- Species: H. eumicroscopica

Binomial name
- Hofmeisterella eumicroscopica (Rchb.f.) Rchb.f.

Synonyms
- Hofmeistera eumicroscopica Rchb.f.

= Hofmeisterella eumicroscopica =

Species of orchid

Hofmeisterella eumicroscopica is an epiphytic orchid native to Venezuela, Colombia, Ecuador, Peru and Bolivia.
