= Dupineta =

Scientific classification
- Kingdom: Plantae
- Clade: Tracheophytes
- Clade: Angiosperms
- Clade: Eudicots
- Clade: Rosids
- Order: Myrtales
- Family: Melastomataceae
- Genus: Dupineta; Raf.

Genus of plants

Dupineta is a genus of flowering plants belonging to the family Melastomataceae.

Its native range is tropical Africa, and found in the countries of Angola, Cameroon, Central African Repu, Congo, Ethiopia, Gabon, Gambia, Guinea, Gulf of Guinea Is., Ivory Coast, Kenya, Liberia, Nigeria, Rwanda, Sierra Leone, Sudan, Tanzania, Togo, Zambia and Zaïre.

The genus name of Dupineta is in honour of Antoine du Pinet (1515–1584), French writer from Lyon, and was first published in Sylva Tellur on page 101 in 1838.

Known species:

- Dupineta brazzae (Cogn.) Ver.-Lib. & G.Kadereit
- Dupineta hensii (Cogn.) Ver.-Lib. & G.Kadereit
- Dupineta loandensis (Exell) Ver.-Lib. & G.Kadereit
- Dupineta multiflora Raf.
- Dupineta pauwelsii (Jacq.-Fél.) Ver.-Lib. & G.Kadereit
