= Dupineta brazzae =

Scientific classification
- Kingdom: Plantae
- Clade: Tracheophytes
- Clade: Angiosperms
- Clade: Eudicots
- Clade: Rosids
- Order: Myrtales
- Family: Melastomataceae
- Genus: Dupineta
- Species: D. brazzae

Binomial name
- Dupineta brazzae (Cogn.) Ver.-Lib. & G.Kadereit

Species of flowering plants

Dupineta brazzae is a herbaceous species occurring in Tropical Africa, it belongs to the family Melastomataceae.

== Description ==
A shrubby herb that is branched from the base and having branches that are sharply angled. Its leaves are opposite and petiolate, with the petiole up to 5 mm long. The leaflets are ovate in shape, up to 10 to 12 cm long and up to 4 to 7 cm wide, they are acuminate at the tip and rounded to cordate at the base. The purplish flowers are arranged in dense cymes, up to 1 cm long with bracts that are acute; its sepals are towards the middle and usually with hairs around the margins.

== Distribution ==
The range of the species is Tropical Africa, from Sierra Leone to Central and Eastern Africa. It is commonly found in gallery forests and open grasslands.

== Uses ==
Leaf extracts of the species are used in traditional medicine to relieve pain and the stem parts are used in decoctions to treat malaria fever.
