= Cigar tree =

Cigar tree is a common name for species in the genus Catalpa that are native to North America, and may refer to:

- Catalpa bignonioides, native to the southeastern United States
- Catalpa speciosa, native to the midwestern United States
