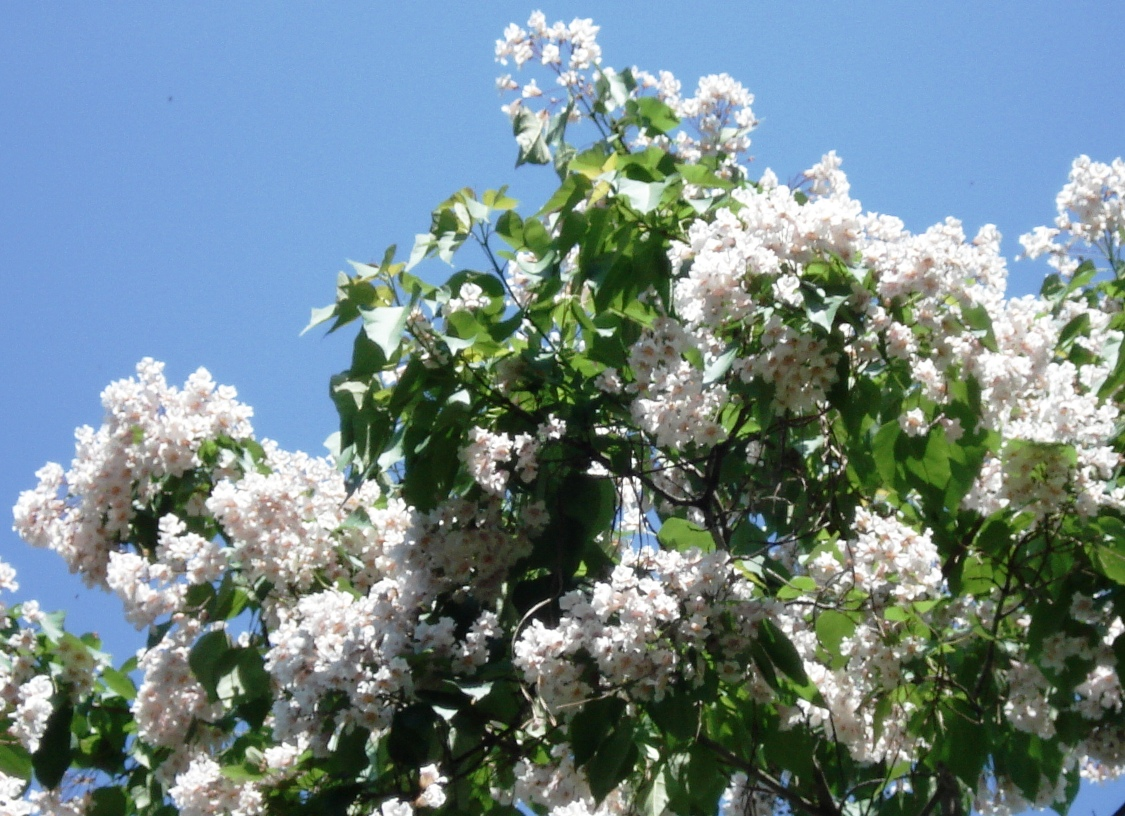

Scientific classification
- Kingdom: Plantae
- Clade: Tracheophytes
- Clade: Angiosperms
- Clade: Eudicots
- Clade: Asterids
- Order: Lamiales
- Family: Bignoniaceae
- Genus: Catalpa
- Species: C. fargesii

Binomial name
- Catalpa fargesii Bureau

= Catalpa fargesii =

Species of tree

Catalpa fargesii, the Chinese bean tree, is a species of tree in the family Bignoniaceae, native to China. Growing to about 25 m tall, it is a deciduous tree which produces abundant pink blossom in spring, followed by narrow brown beans-like fruit in the autumn. Some sources place the species as a synonym of Catalpa bungei.

== Description ==
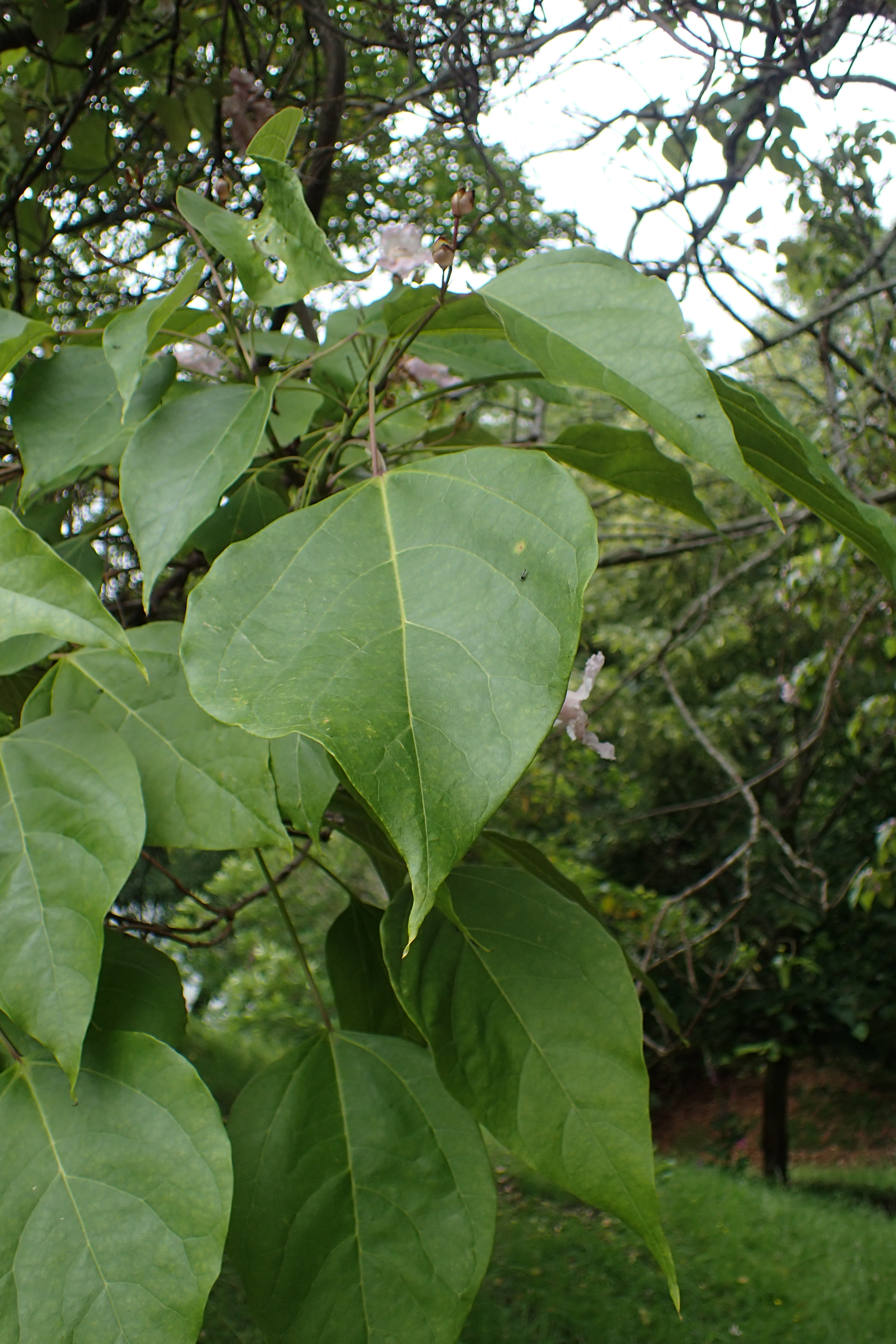
The leaves of Catalpa fargesii

The tree can grow up to 20–25 m (66–82 ft) tall. It has a petiole (leaf-stems) which are 3–10 cm (1.2–3.9 in) long. It has leaves which are broadly ovate, straight or slightly heart-shaped at the base, or long and taper-pointed. They are 13–20 cm (5.1–7.9 in) long and 10–13 cm (3.9–5.1 in) wide. They have a soft, downy underside, which does fade at the end of the growing season. It blooms in summer, The flowers are similar in form to those of paulownia. The corolla is bell-shaped, two-lipped flowers are borne in corymbs or racemes, of between 7 and 15 individual flowers. They are 3.2 cm (1.3 in) long. They come in shades from lilac, pinkish, or pale red to pale purple. The throat is freckled with purple, brownish red, or brownish spots, on a background of yellow staining. It has small anthers and a 2-lobed stigma.

After it flowers, it produces seeds between June and November. The long and very slender, seed capsule or seed-pod is 55–80 cm (22–31 in) long. Inside are linear and thin membranous seeds, they have hairs at both ends.

== Taxonomy ==
It is written in Chinese script as 灰楸 hui qiu

The Latin specific epithet fargesii refers to Père Farges, a French missionary and naturalist who was stationed in China from 1867 to 1912, he collected the original specimens in the wild, in Sichuan. It was also later found by Ernest Henry Wilson, who then sent seed from Hubei to the west, in 1901 and then again in 1907.

Catalpa fargesii was first published and described by Édouard Bureau, a French botanist (1830-1918), in 'Nouv. Arch. Mus. Hist. Nat.' (Nouvelles Archives du Muséum d'Histoire Naturelle, printed in Paris) Séries 2, Vol.7 on page 195 in 1884.

== Distribution and habitat ==
Catalpa fargesii is native to the temperate region of Asia. Mostly in China. Within the provinces of; Gansu, Guangdong, Guangxi, Guizhou, Hebei, Henan, Hubei, Hunan, Shaanxi (including the Qinling Mountains area,), Shandong, Sichuan and Yunnan.

=== Habitat ===
It is found in the forests, along roadsides and on slopes, at an altitude of 700–1,500 m (2,300–4,900 ft) above sea level.

== Cultivation ==
Like many of the species in the Catalpa genus, C. fargesii will thrive in full or part sun, poor or fertile soil and will grow across most climate zones. It would do well across southern Australia, all of the UK and in North America.

This species is more compact than its more famous relative, Catalpa bignonioides, and is therefore more suitable for domestic gardens. The form Catalpa fargesii f. duclouxii has received the Royal Horticultural Society's Award of Garden Merit.

== Other sources ==
- Govaerts, R. (1999). World Checklist of Seed Plants 3(1, 2a & 2b): 1–1532. MIM, Deurne.
- Zhang, Z. & Thawatchai, S. (1998). Bignoniaceae Flora of China 18: 213–225. Missouri Botanical Garden Press, St. Louis.
