= Sinomphisa plagialis =

Scientific classification
- Kingdom: Animalia
- Phylum: Arthropoda
- Class: Insecta
- Order: Lepidoptera
- Family: Crambidae
- Genus: Sinomphisa
- Species: S. plagialis

Binomial name
- Sinomphisa plagialis (Wileman, 1911)

Synonyms
- Pionea plagialis Wileman, 1911; Omphisa albalis Caradja, 1925

Species of moth

Sinomphisa plagialis, the Manchurian catalpa shoot borer, is a moth in the family Crambidae. It is found in Japan, China and Korea.

The wingspan is 23–26 mm.

The larvae feed on Catalpa bungei and Catalpa ovata. They bore into young shoots of their host plant. The species overwinters in the larval stage.
