= Sinomphisa =

Scientific classification
- Kingdom: Animalia
- Phylum: Arthropoda
- Class: Insecta
- Order: Lepidoptera
- Family: Crambidae
- Subfamily: Spilomelinae
- Tribe: Margaroniini
- Genus: Sinomphisa; Munroe, 1958

Genus of moths

Sinomphisa is a genus of moths of the family Crambidae described by Eugene G. Munroe in 1958.

== Species ==
- Sinomphisa jeannelalis (Marion & Viette, 1956)
- Sinomphisa junctilinealis (Hampson, 1918)
- Sinomphisa plagialis (Wileman, 1911)
