= Sinomphisa jeannelalis =

Scientific classification
- Kingdom: Animalia
- Phylum: Arthropoda
- Clade: Pancrustacea
- Class: Insecta
- Order: Lepidoptera
- Family: Crambidae
- Genus: Sinomphisa
- Species: S. jeannelalis

Binomial name
- Sinomphisa jeannelalis (Marion & Viette, 1956)

Synonyms
- Polygrammodes jeannelalis Marion & Viette, 1956

Species of moth

Sinomphisa jeannelalis is a species of moth in the family Crambidae. It is found in Madagascar and on the Seychelles, where it has been recorded from Mahé.
