= Sinomphisa junctilinealis =

Scientific classification
- Kingdom: Animalia
- Phylum: Arthropoda
- Class: Insecta
- Order: Lepidoptera
- Family: Crambidae
- Genus: Sinomphisa
- Species: S. junctilinealis

Binomial name
- Sinomphisa junctilinealis (Hampson, 1918)

Synonyms
- Polygrammodes junctilinealis Hampson, 1918

Species of moth

Sinomphisa junctilinealis is a moth in the family Crambidae. It is found in Sierra Leone and Uganda.

The wingspan is 38–50 mm. The forewings are yellowish white, the basal area, costal area to the end of the cell, the cell and the veins of the terminal half are tinged with rufous. There is a red-brown streak below the basal half of costa and a diffused red-brown subbasal line from the cell to the inner margin, as well as a red-brown spot in the cell towards its extremity with an elliptical red-brown spot below it in the submedian interspace. There is also a quadrate discoidal patch with yellowish striga in the centre and a strong, waved red-brown postmedial line. The subterminal line is red-brown, joined above the inner margin by an oblique bar from the angle of the postmedial line at vein 2. The terminal line is red-brown. The hindwings are yellowish white with a black-brown discoidal bar with a strong slightly curved line from it to above the inner margin. The postmedial line is strong and dark red brown. It is joined at vein 2 by a waved red-brown subterminal line. The terminal line is dark red-brown.
