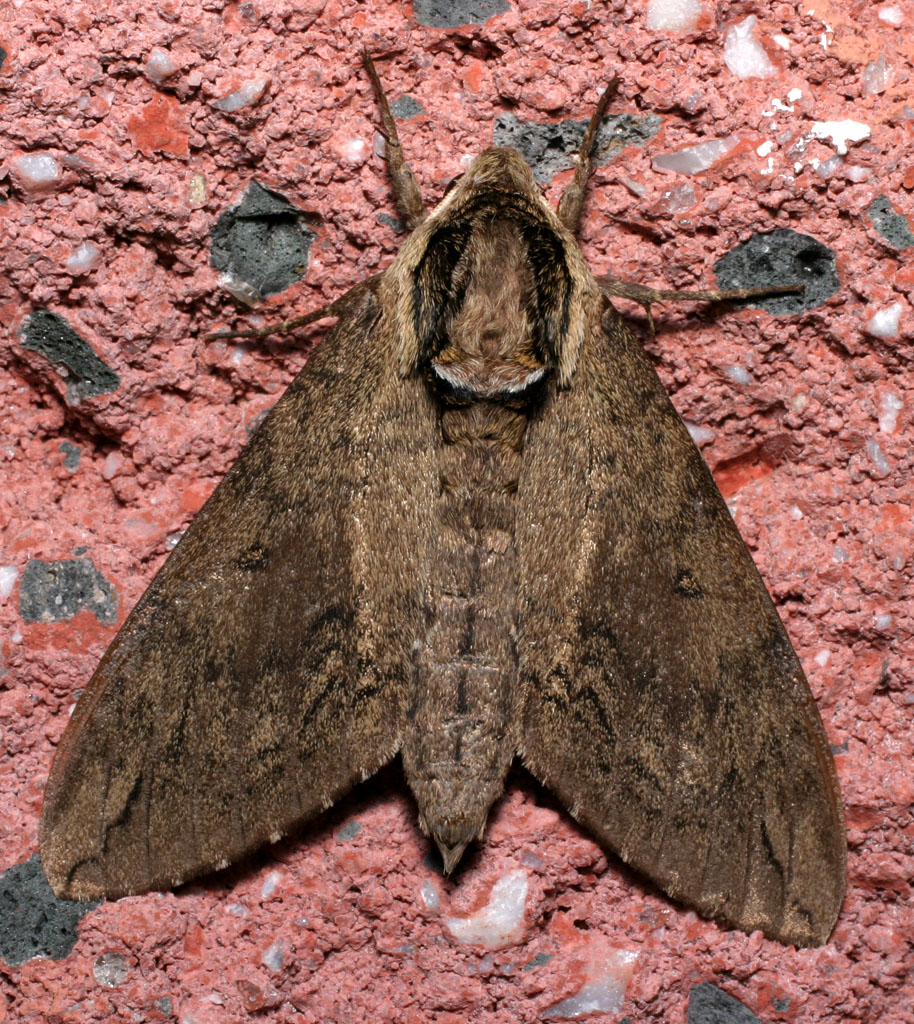

Scientific classification
- Kingdom: Animalia
- Phylum: Arthropoda
- Clade: Pancrustacea
- Class: Insecta
- Order: Lepidoptera
- Family: Sphingidae
- Genus: Ceratomia
- Species: C. catalpae

Binomial name
- Ceratomia catalpae (Boisduval, 1875)

Synonyms
- Sphinx catalpae Boisduval, 1875; Ceratomia catalpae kansensis Howe & Howe, 1950; Ceratomia catalpae kanawahensis Sweadner, Chermock & Chermock, 1940

= Ceratomia catalpae =

Catalpa sphinx

Species of moth

Ceratomia catalpae, the catalpa sphinx, is a hawk moth of the family Sphingidae. The species was first described by Jean Baptiste Boisduval in 1875. Other common names are the Catawba worm, or Catalpa sphinx.

== Range ==
Ceratomia catalpae is a native of southeastern North America and can be located on catalpa trees that grow within this region. It can be found from Maine, west to Iowa, and south to the Gulf States.

== Life cycle ==
From oviposition of the eggs to pupation, about four weeks will pass. Where multiple broods occur, pupae will eclose in two weeks, or when conditions are suitable. Adult C. catalpae do not reflect the wonderful colors of their larvae. They are a dull brown color lacking the show-off appearance of its larval stages.

=== Egg ===
Translucent, milky-white, green, or yellowish eggs are oval, being about 0.5 mm in diameter. Eggs are deposited in masses of 100-1000 eggs on the undersurface of leaves, while smaller masses are deposited onto branches on the catalpa tree. Eggs incubate and hatch five to seven days after oviposition.

=== Larva ===
The larval stage of C. catalpae is known as the catalpa, catawba worm, and toppy worm. When first hatching, the larvae are very pale, but become darker toward the last instars. The yellow caterpillars will usually have a dark, black stripe down their back along with black dots along their sides. There is also a "pale" phase where the black striping is not as prevalent or missing altogether and a shade of white has replaced it. They grow to a length of about 5 cm (2.0 in) and feed on the leaves of the northern catalpa and, more commonly, the southern catalpa, also known as catawba or Indian bean trees. They are highly desired by fishermen as bait.

=== Pupa ===
Like most other Sphingidae, Ceratomia catalpae will burrow into the ground after its fifth and final instar in order to pupate. The larvae will go into a "wandering" stage where it leaves the catalpa tree and climbs to the ground to find a place to bury itself so that it may pupate. The larvae will then shed its fifth instar skin to reveal its pupal skin, which will be soft and almost translucent at first, but will then harden to a light brown for protection from the elements.

=== Adult ===
The adult catalpa sphinx is brown with a circular band of dark brown or black surrounding its thorax. Each forewing has a small, dark mark towards the middle, with a white dot in the cell. The body is approximately 30 mm long. The wingspan is 65–95 mm.

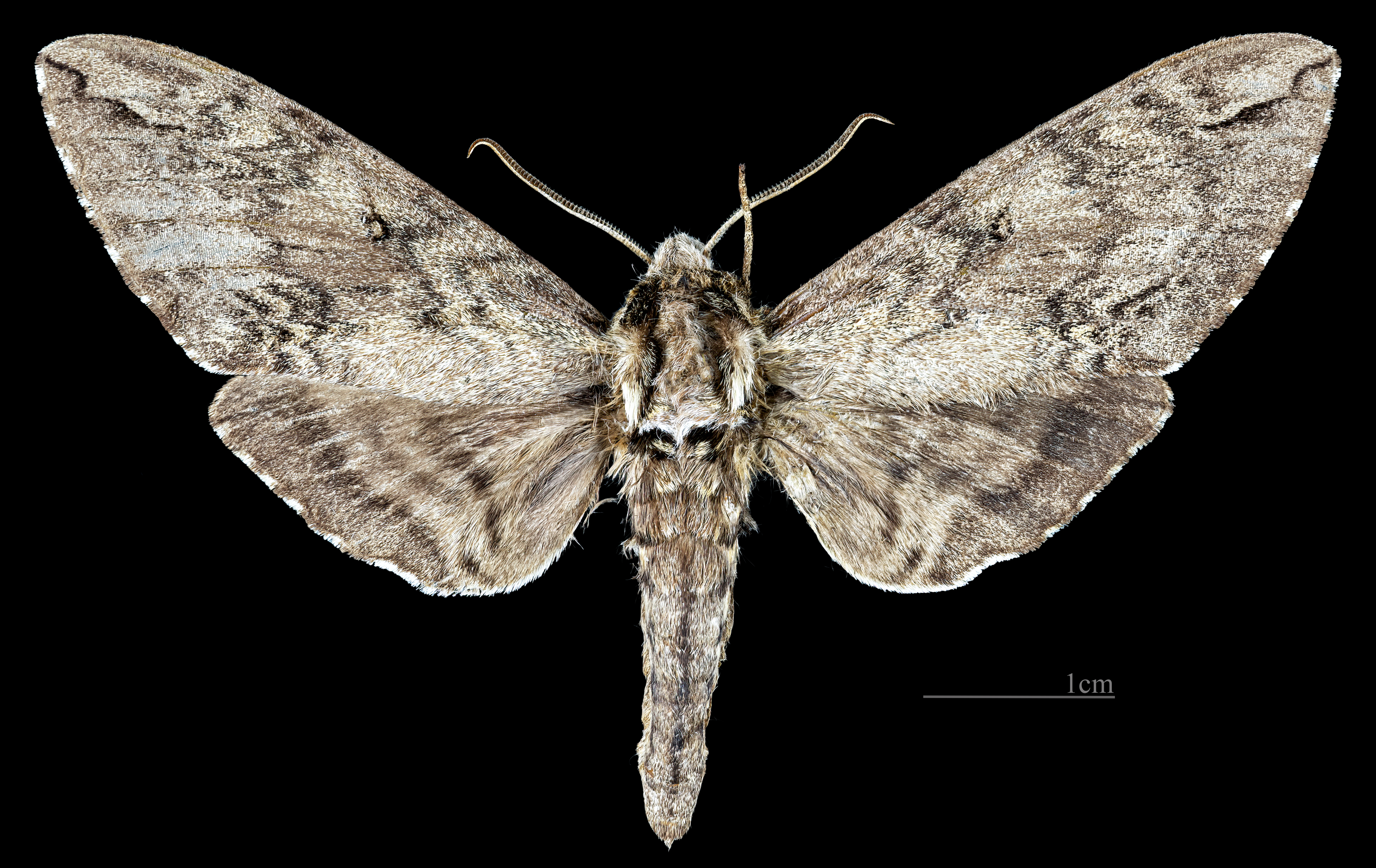
♂

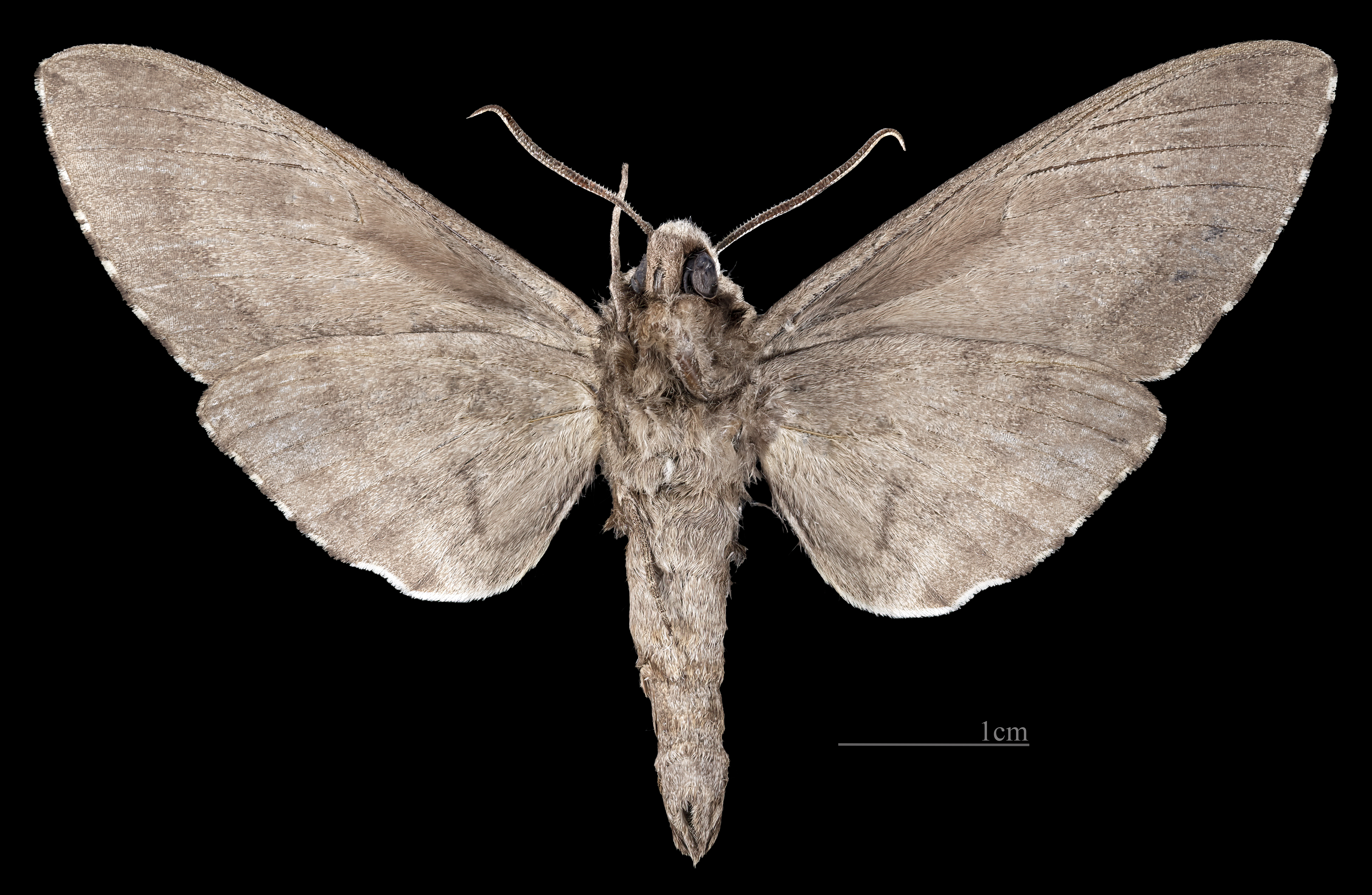
♂ △

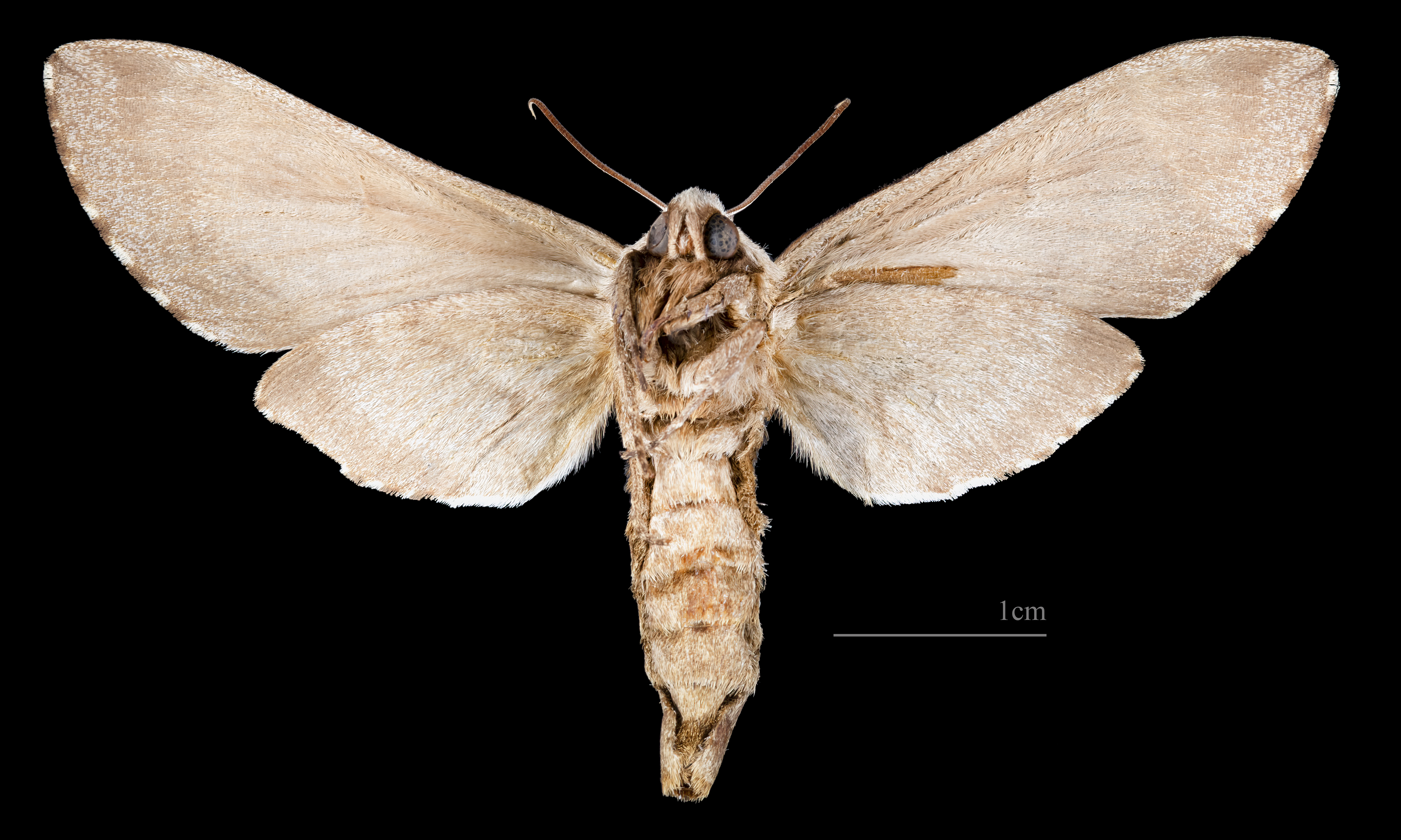
♀

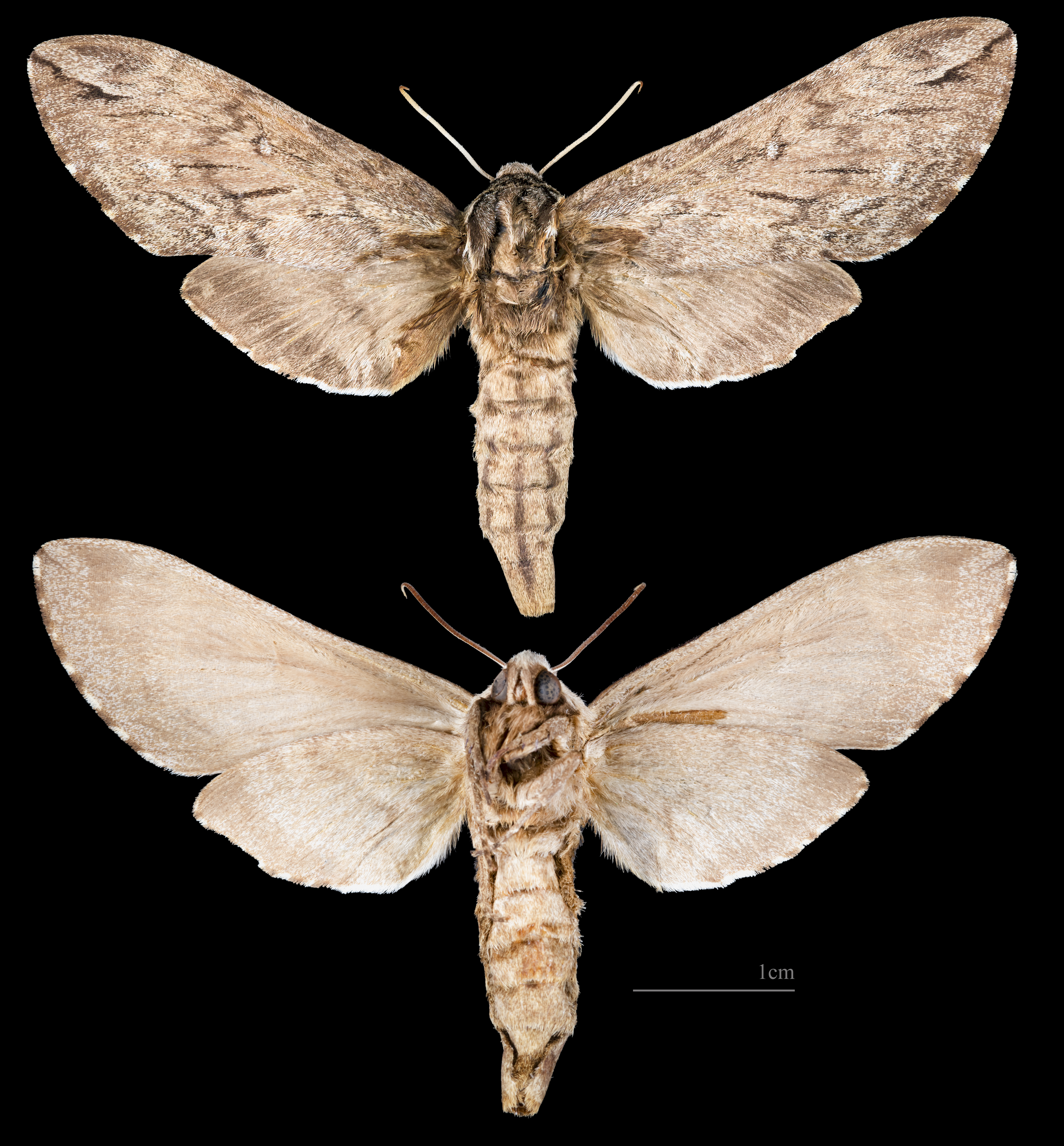
♀ △

=== Images of life cycle ===
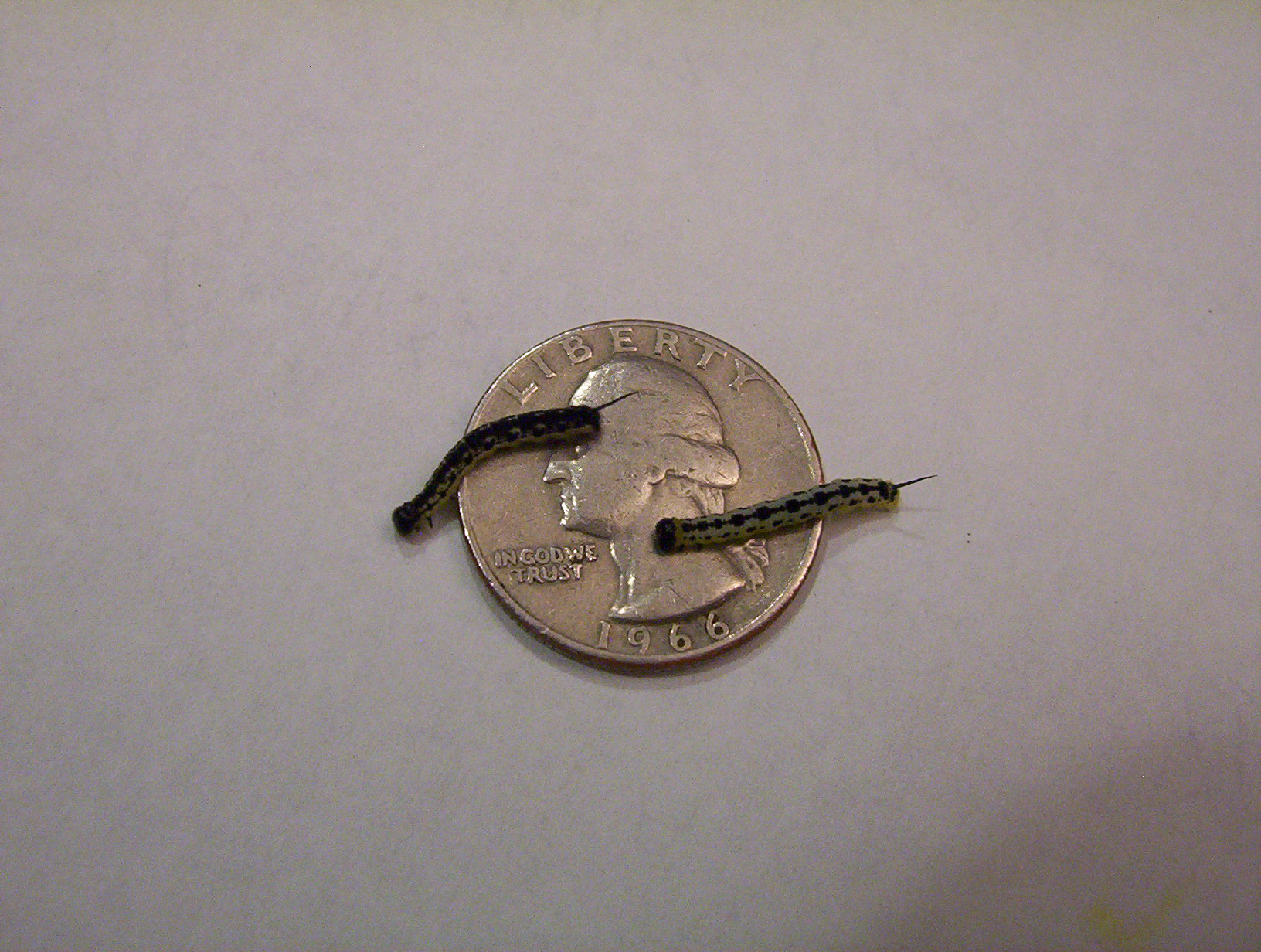
Two C. catalpae in their first instar

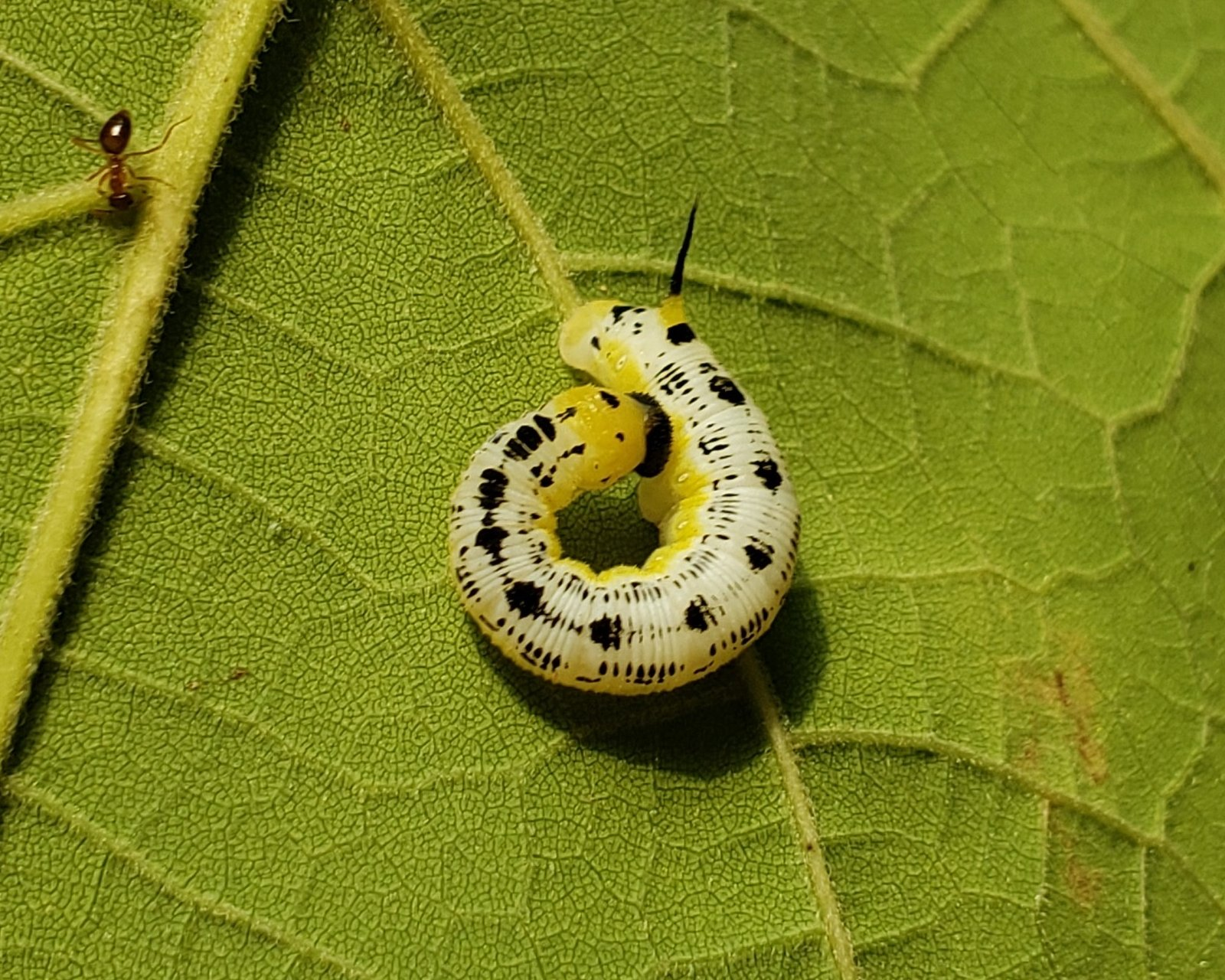
Early instar larva

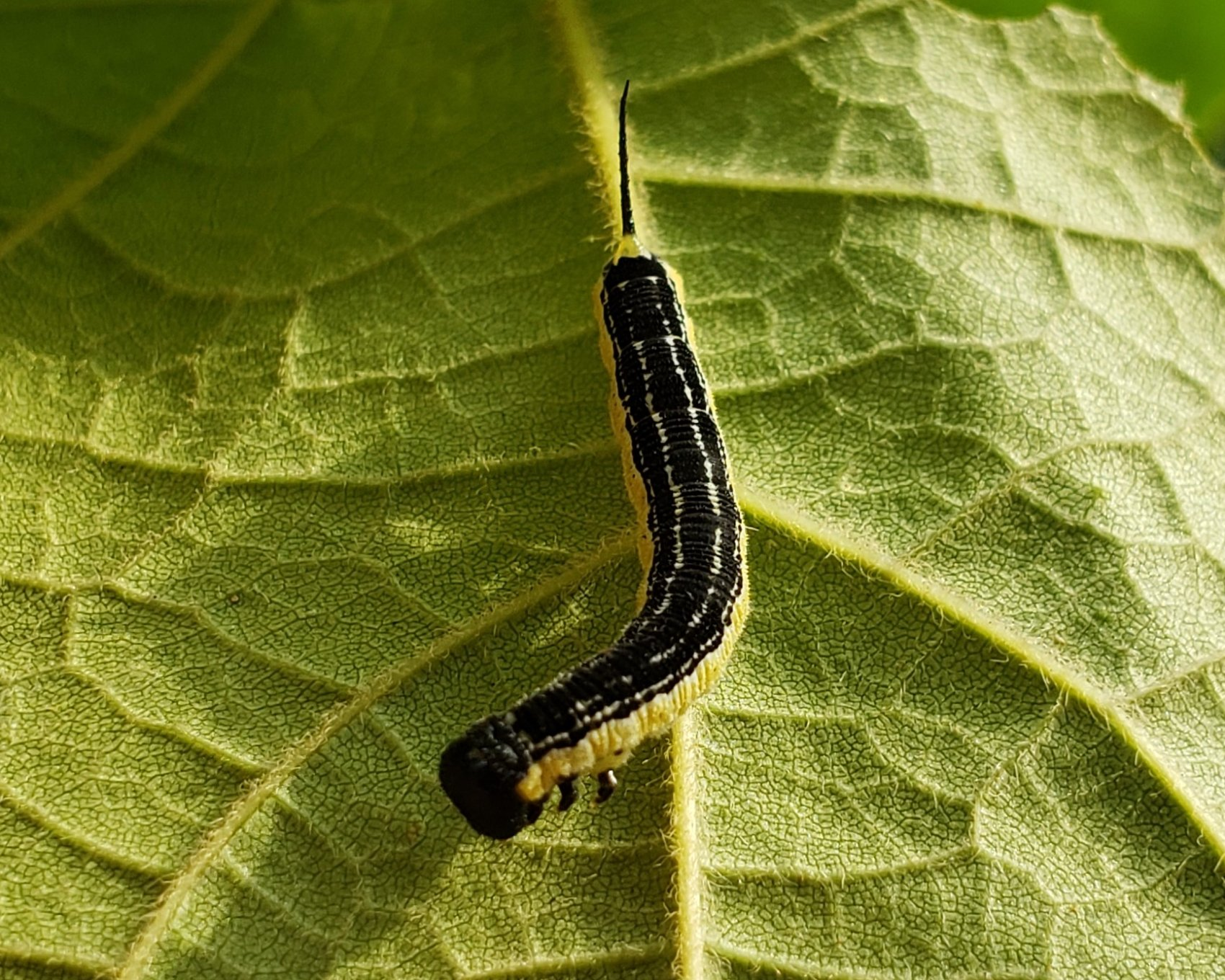
Middle instar larva

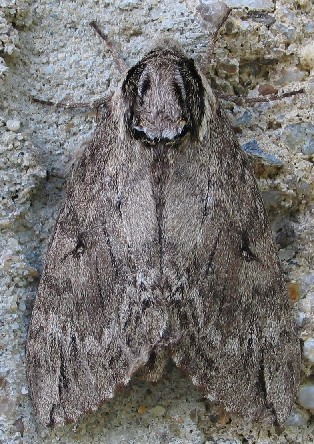
Catalpa sphinx resting

== Food plants ==
C. catalpae can be quite harmful to the catalpa tree during large outbreaks. The first trial of aerial crop dusting was an attempt to control the catalpa sphinx. However, more recent research may indicate the caterpillars are not as harmful as once thought. The research of Stephen L. Peele, curator of the Florida Mycology Research Center, indicates that catalpa trees might be completely defoliated multiple times during a single summer yet still survive and return to full health, a process which, Peele says, no other tree could survive. "They always come back. They always look healthy," says Peele. "I have tried to understand the possible symbiotic relationship between the worm and the tree. There surely must be one."

- Catalpa bignonioides, (southern catalpa)
- Catalpa speciosa, (northern catalpa)

== Human use ==
C. catalpae caterpillars are used as fishing baits to catch bass, bream, and catfish.
