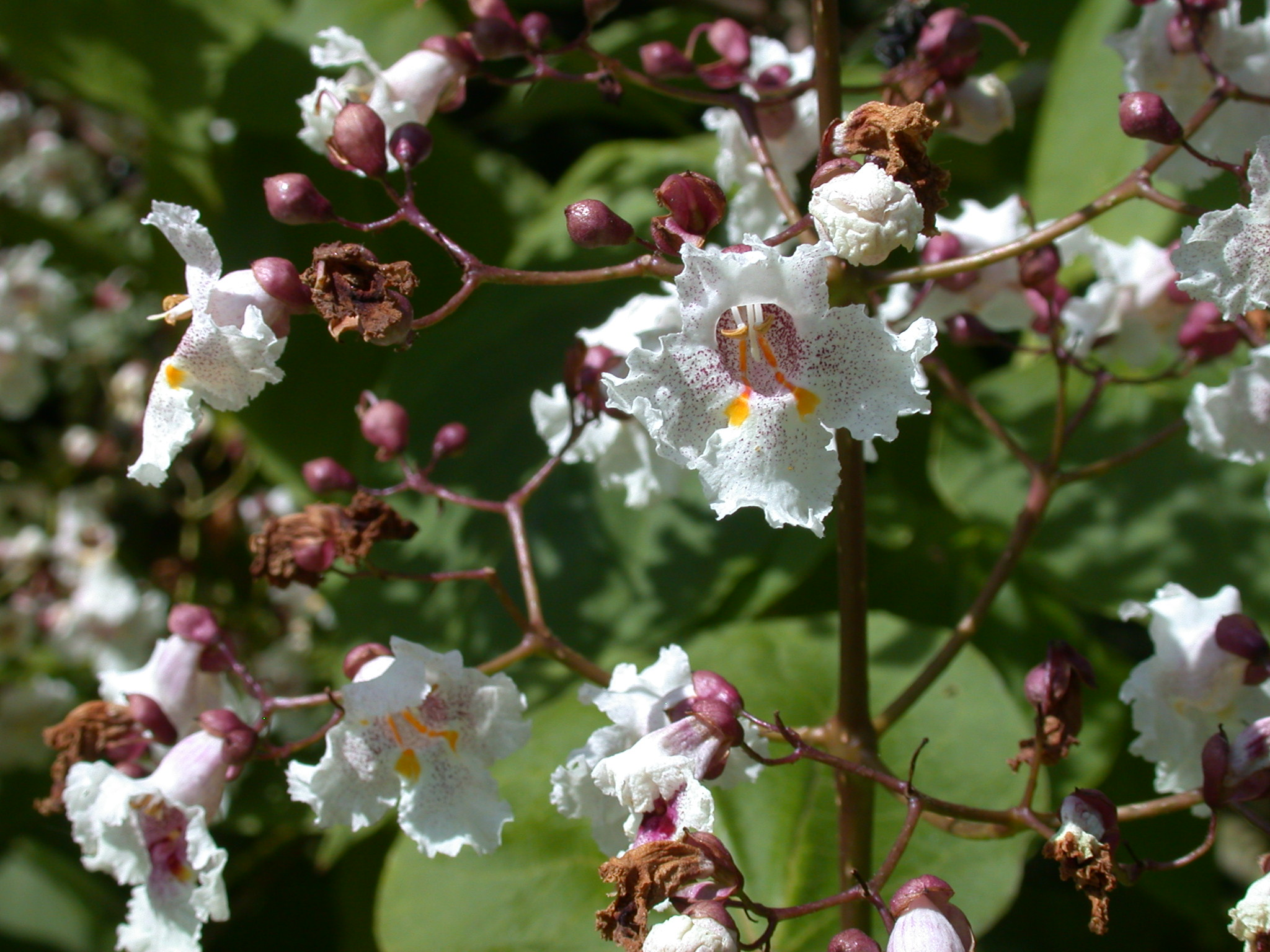
- Flowers at the Cambridge University Botanic Garden

Scientific classification
- Kingdom: Plantae
- Clade: Tracheophytes
- Clade: Angiosperms
- Clade: Eudicots
- Clade: Asterids
- Order: Lamiales
- Family: Bignoniaceae
- Genus: Catalpa
- Species: C. × erubescens

Binomial name
- Catalpa × erubescens Carrière

= Catalpa × erubescens =

Hybrid species of flowering plant

Catalpa × erubescens (or Catalpa erubescens), the hybrid catalpa, is a hybrid plant species of Catalpa in the family Bignoniaceae. It is a medium-sized tree, reaching at most 20 m. Its parents are southern catalpa, Catalpa bignonioides, from the United States, and yellow catalpa, C. ovata, from China. There is one accepted form, Catalpa × erubescens Carrière f. purpurea (Wawra & Abel) Paclt, which has purple, some say chocolate-colored, young leaves which turn green as they mature. This form is marketed under a variety of names, such as hybrid catalpa 'Purpurea', red-leaved Indian bean tree, and purple hybrid catalpa, and has gained the Royal Horticultural Society's Award of Garden Merit.
