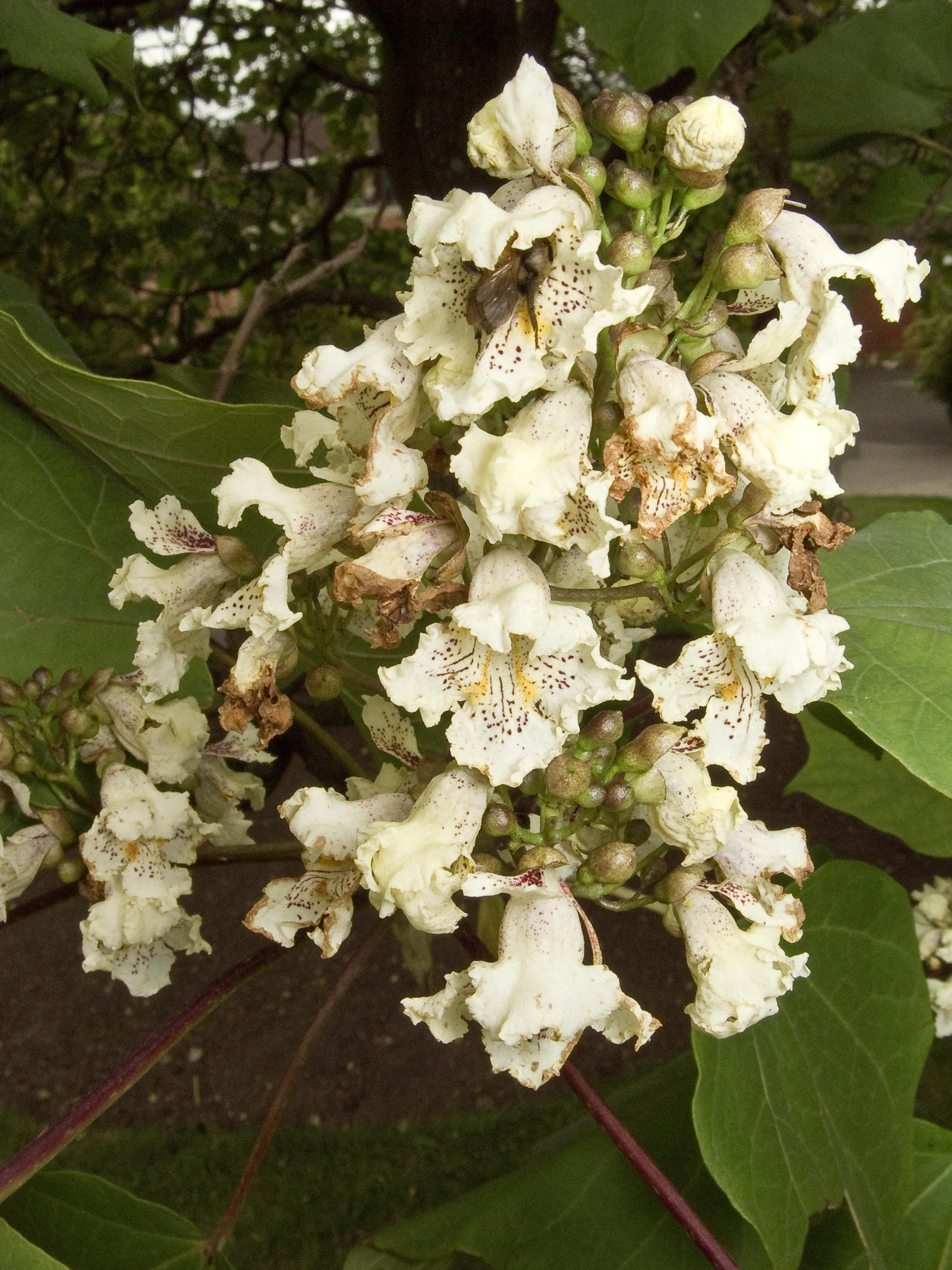
- Flowers

Scientific classification
- Kingdom: Plantae
- Clade: Tracheophytes
- Clade: Angiosperms
- Clade: Eudicots
- Clade: Asterids
- Order: Lamiales
- Family: Bignoniaceae
- Genus: Catalpa
- Species: C. ovata

Binomial name
- Catalpa ovata G.Don

Synonyms
- Catalpa kaempferi Siebold & Zucc.

= Catalpa ovata =

Species of plant

Catalpa ovata, the yellow catalpa or Chinese catalpa (Chinese: 梓; pinyin: zǐ), is a pod-bearing tree native to China. Compared to C. speciosa, it is much smaller, typically reaching heights between 20 and 30 feet (6 and 9 m). The inflorescences form 4–10-inch-long (100–250 mm) bunches of creamy white flowers with distinctly yellow tinging; individual flowers are about 1 inch (25 mm) wide. They bloom in July and August. The leaves are very similar in shape to those of Paulownia tomentosa, having three lobes (two are abruptly truncated on either edge, with a third, central, slightly acute, pointed lobe forming the leaf apex), and are darkly green. Fruits are very narrow, foot-long pods.

Although native to the more temperate provinces within China (Anhui, Gansu, Hebei, Heilongjiang, Henan, Hubei, Jiangsu, Jilin, Liaoning, Nei Monggol, Ningxia, Qinghai, Shaanxi, Shandong, Shanxi, Sichuan, Xinjiang), C. ovata is also cultivated in North America and Europe, and has become a parent of Catalpa × erubescens with the American species Catalpa bignonioides. It is commonly used to make the undersides of qin.

== Gallery ==
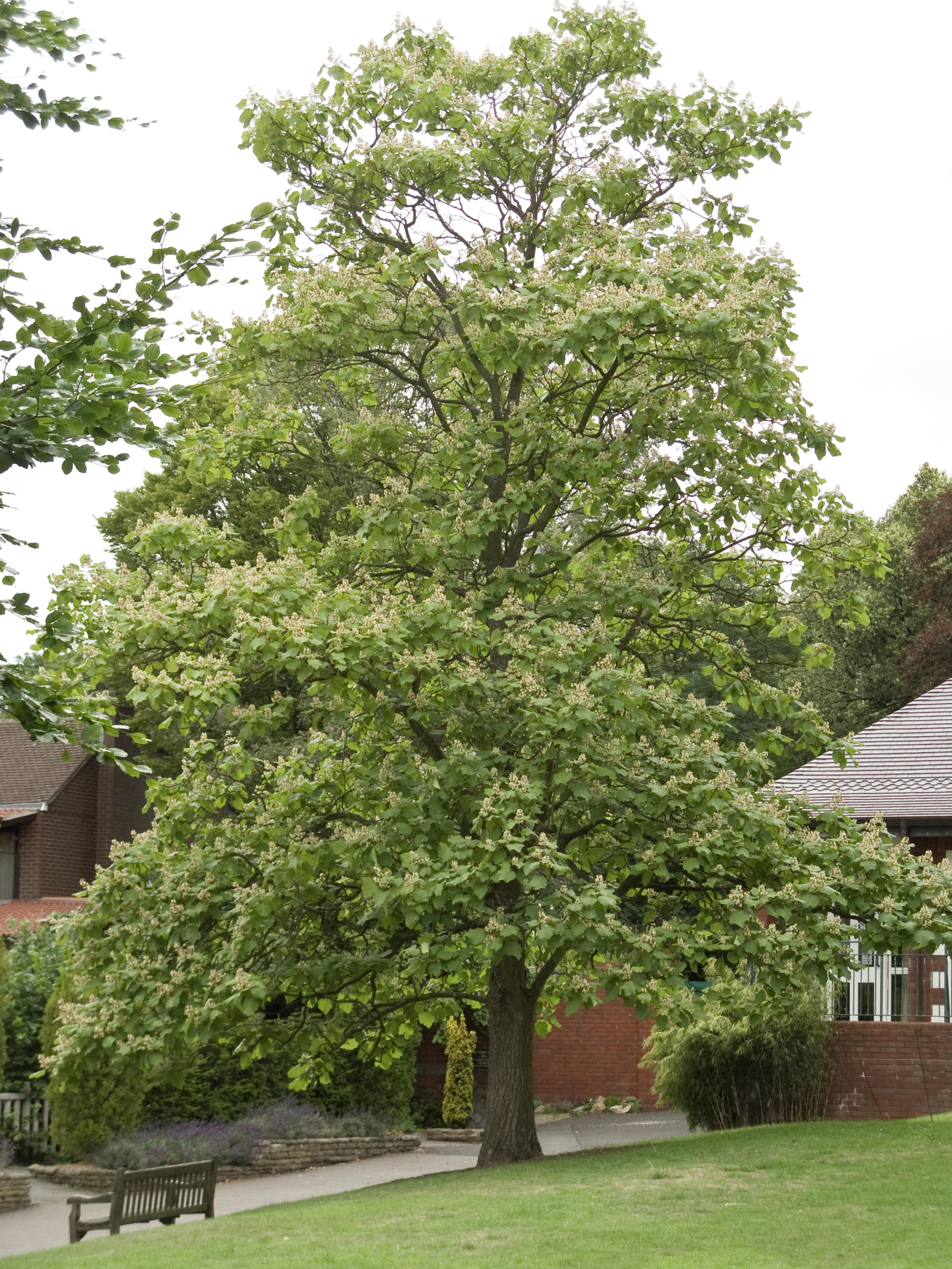
Tree in flower in cultivation at the Birmingham Botanical Gardens (United Kingdom)

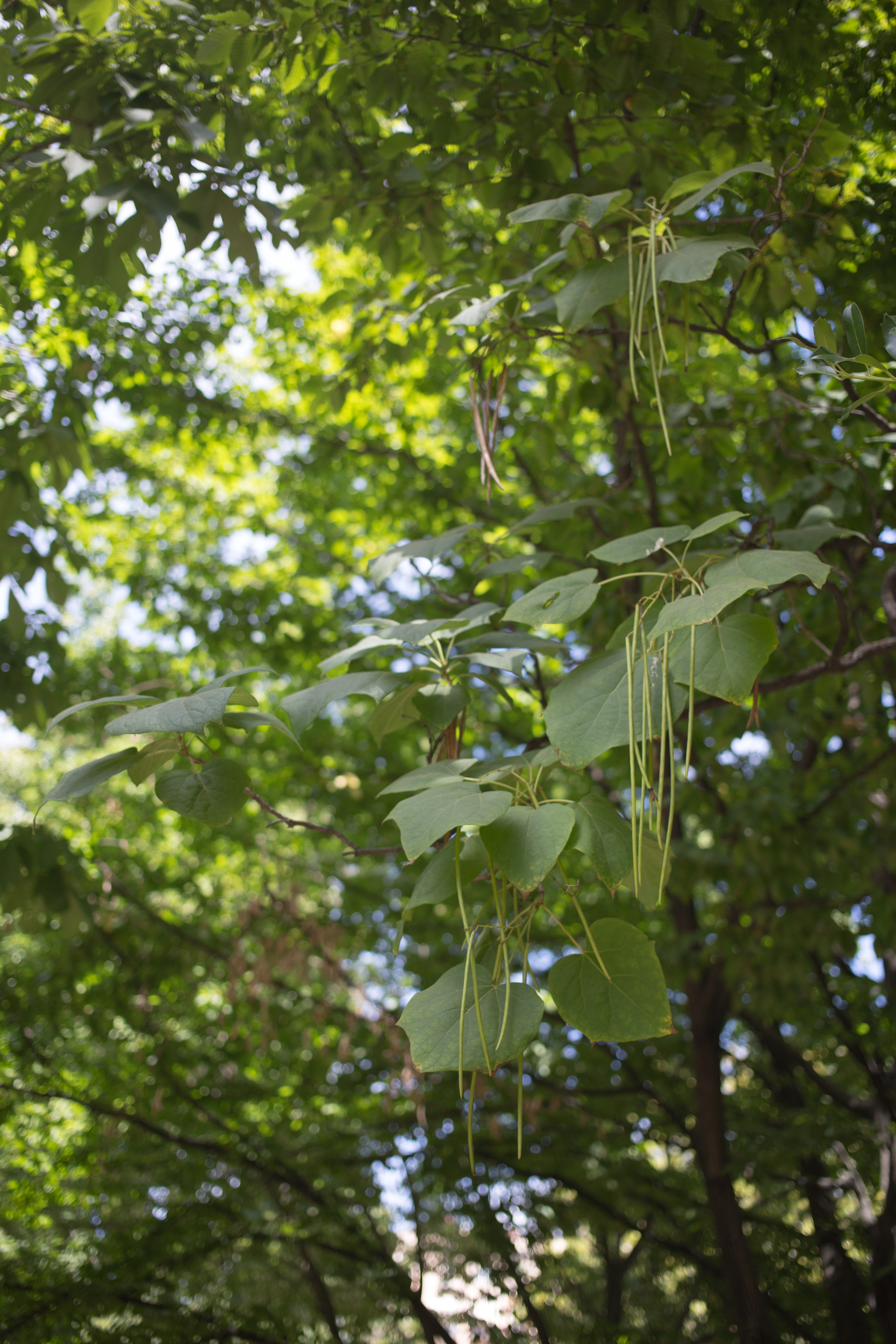
Leaves and pods

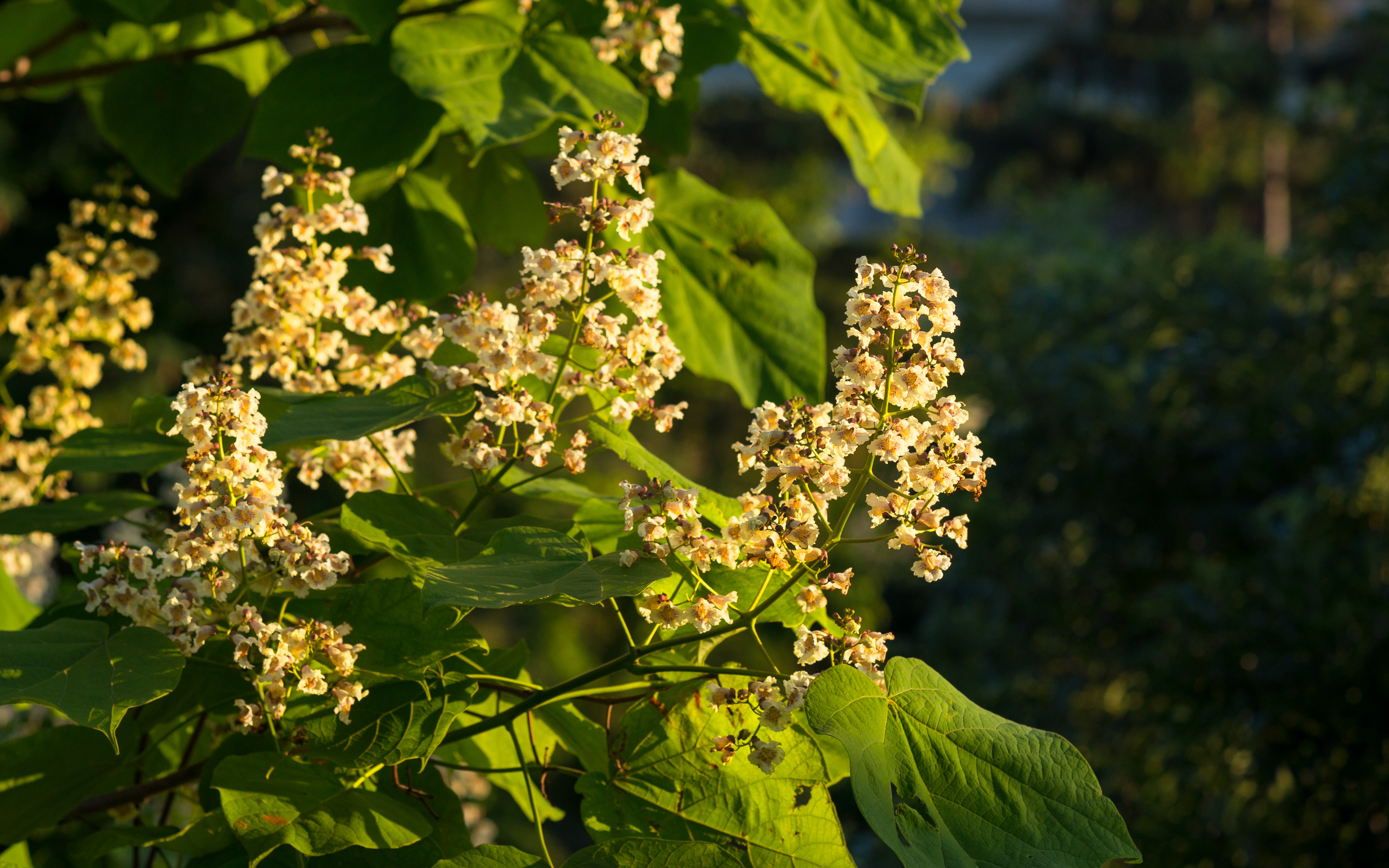
Closeup of mature Catalpa ovata at sunset

== Chemistry ==
The plant contains dehydro-alpha-lapachone (DAL) which inhibits vessel regeneration, interferes with vessel anastomosis, and limits plexus formation in zebrafish. DAL also controlled the development of the fungi rice blast, tomato late blight, wheat leaf rust, barley powdery mildew and red pepper anthracnose (Colletotrichum coccodes (Wallr) S Hughes). The chemical was particularly effective in suppressing anthracnose.

== Other ==
Referenced in the Zhuangzi.
