= Catalpa brevipes =

Conservation status
- Vulnerable (IUCN 2.3)

Scientific classification
- Kingdom: Plantae
- Clade: Tracheophytes
- Clade: Angiosperms
- Clade: Eudicots
- Clade: Asterids
- Order: Lamiales
- Family: Bignoniaceae
- Genus: Catalpa
- Species: C. brevipes

Binomial name
- Catalpa brevipes Urb.

Species of tree

Catalpa brevipes is a species of small tree in the family Bignoniaceae. It is native to Cuba (in Baire, a hilly area that lies on the north side of the Sierra Maestra mountains, and coastal Cabo Cruz), the Dominican Republic (Azua Province), and Haiti (Massif de la Hotte).

Its habitat is dry, limestone-soil forests.
