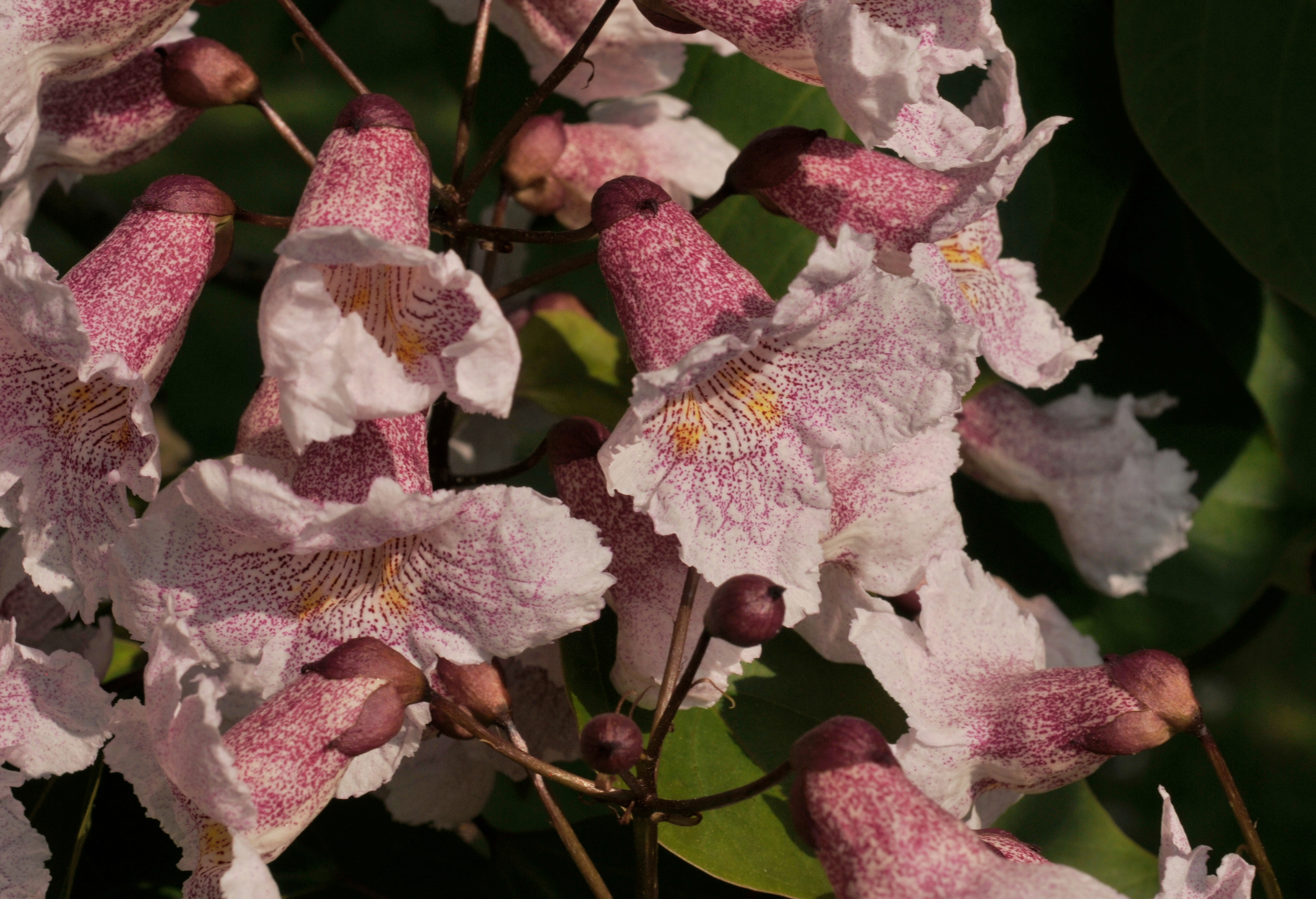

Conservation status
- Least Concern (IUCN 3.1)

Scientific classification
- Kingdom: Plantae
- Clade: Tracheophytes
- Clade: Angiosperms
- Clade: Eudicots
- Clade: Asterids
- Order: Lamiales
- Family: Bignoniaceae
- Genus: Catalpa
- Species: C. bungei

Binomial name
- Catalpa bungei C.A.Mey. (1837)

Synonyms
- Catalpa duclouxii Dode (1907); Catalpa fargesii Bureau (1894); Catalpa fargesii f. alba Q.Q.Liu & H.Y.Ye (1993); Catalpa fargesii f. duclouxii (Dode) Gilmour (1936); Catalpa heterophylla (C.A.Mey.) Dode (1907); Catalpa sutchuenensis Dode (1907); Catalpa syringifolia Bunge (1833), nom. illeg.; Catalpa vestita Diels (1901)

= Catalpa bungei =

Manchurian catalpa

Species of tree

Catalpa bungei, commonly known as Manchurian catalpa, is a species of catalpa native to China. The specific epithet honors the botanist Alexander Bunge, who collected the specimens that Carl Anton von Meyer later described. The flowers are arranged in a corymb and are densely spotted with pink. It is cultivated in China, along with C. ovata, for its wood, which is also used for coffins, ancestral tablets, and oars. It also used as an ornamental tree.
