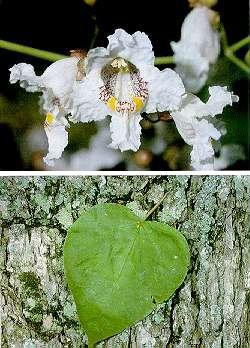
- Catalpa speciosa flowers, leaf and bark

Scientific classification
- Kingdom: Plantae
- Clade: Tracheophytes
- Clade: Angiosperms
- Clade: Eudicots
- Clade: Asterids
- Order: Lamiales
- Family: Bignoniaceae
- Tribe: Catalpeae
- Genus: Catalpa; Scopoli

Species
- See text

= Catalpa =

Catalpa Temporal range: Early Oligocene–Recent

Genus of plants

Catalpa (/kə-ˈtæl-pə/, /kə-ˈtɑːl-pə/), also commonly called catawba, is a genus of flowering plants in the family Bignoniaceae, native to warm temperate and subtropical regions of North America, the Caribbean, and East Asia.

== Description ==
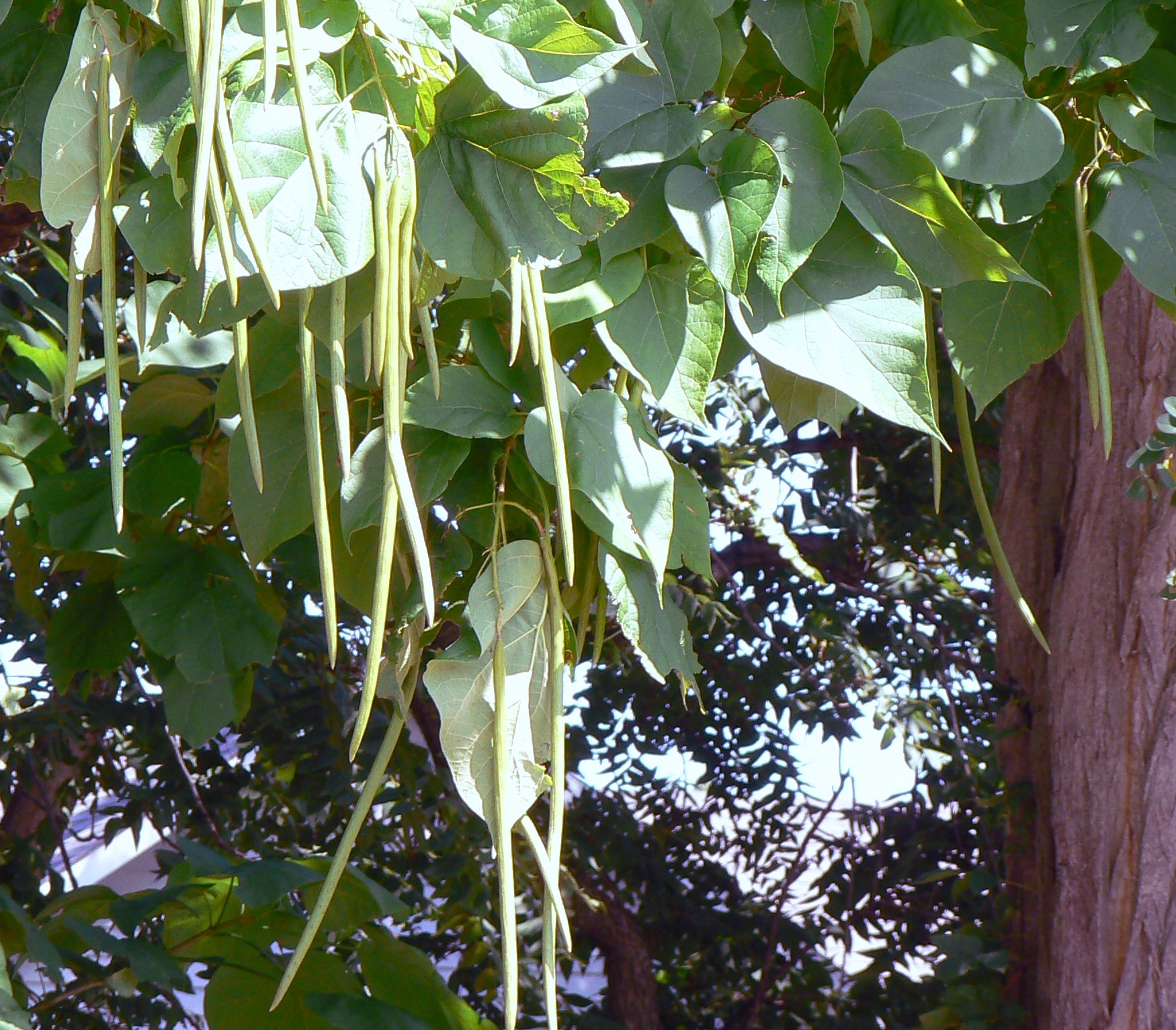
"Beanpods" and leaf details of the northern catalpa

Most Catalpa are deciduous trees; they typically grow to 12–18 metres (40–60 ft) tall, with branches spreading to a diameter of about 6–12 metres (20–40 ft). They are fast growers and a 10-year-old sapling may stand about 6 metres (20 ft) tall. They have characteristic large, heart-shaped leaves, which in some species are three-lobed. The appearance of the leaves sometimes causes confusion with species such as the unrelated tung tree (Vernicia fordii) and Paulownia tomentosa. Catalpa species bear broad panicles of showy flowers, generally in summer. The flower colour generally is white to yellow. In late summer or autumn the fruit appear; they are siliques about 20–50 centimetres (8–20 in) long, full of small flat seeds, each with two thin wings to aid in wind dispersal.

The large leaves and dense foliage of Catalpa species provide good shelter from rain and wind, making the trees an attractive habitat for many species of birds. They do not present many threats of falling limbs, but the dark-brown fruit husks that they drop in late summer may be a nuisance.

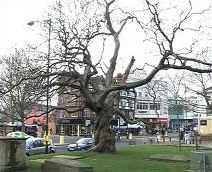
The catalpa tree in Reading, Berkshire, England

Though Catalpa wood is quite soft, it is popular for turning and for furniture when well seasoned, as it is considered attractive, stable, and easy to work.

Most catalpas begin flowering after roughly three years, and produce fruit after about five years.

== Species ==
The two North American species, Catalpa bignonioides (southern catalpa) and Catalpa speciosa (northern catalpa), have been widely planted outside their natural ranges as ornamental trees for their showy flowers and attractive shape. Northern and southern catalpas are very similar in appearance, but the northern species has slightly larger leaves, flowers, and bean pods. Flowering starts after 275 growing degree days. Catalpa ovata from China, with pale yellow flowers, is also planted outside its natural range for ornamental purposes. This allowed C. bignonioides and C. ovata to hybridize, with the resultant Catalpa × erubescens also becoming a cultivated ornamental.

=== List of species ===
Sources: (GRIN accepts eight species) (KEW accepts eight species)

- Section Catalpa (North America and East Asia):
  - Catalpa bignonioides Walter – southern catalpa
  - Catalpa bungei C.A.Mey. – Manchurian catalpa
  - Catalpa fargesii Bureau (sometimes treated as a synonym of C. bungei)
  - Catalpa ovata G.Don – Chinese catalpa, yellow catalpa
  - Catalpa speciosa Warder ex Engelm. – northern catalpa
- Section Macrocatalpa (Caribbean):
  - Catalpa brevipes Urb.
  - Catalpa purpurea Griseb
  - Catalpa macrocarpa Ekman
  - Catalpa longissima (Jacq.) Dum.Cours

== Evolution ==
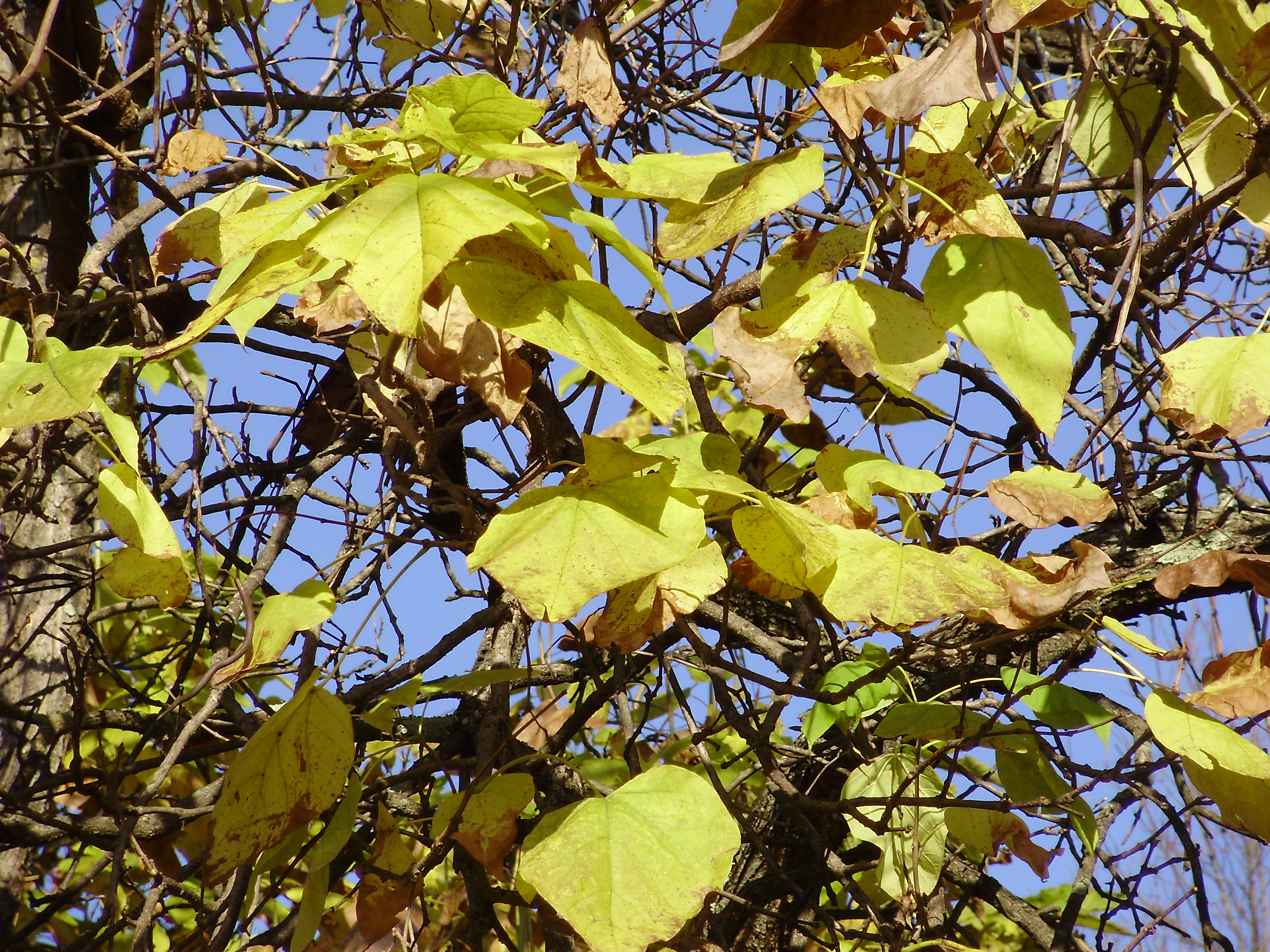
Autumn foliage

The genus likely originated in North America, with the oldest fossils of the genus being seeds from the Early Oligocene (Rupelian) of Oregon, US. Fossil species are also known from the Late Oligocene (Chattian) of Europe, but they appear to have become extinct in the region by the Miocene epoch. The fossil species Catalpa hispaniolae known from Dominican amber indicates the presence of the genus in the Caribbean by the Miocene. Fossil leaves from China indicate their presence in East Asia by the mid Miocene. The living North American species C. bignonioides and C. speciosa seem to have originated from a back-migration to North America from East Asia, probably during the late Miocene.

== Etymology ==
The name derives from the Muscogee name for the tree, "kutuhlpa" meaning "winged head" and is unrelated to the name of the Catawba people. The spellings "Catalpa" and "Catalpah" were used by Mark Catesby between 1729 and 1732, and Carl Linnaeus published the tree's name as Bignonia catalpa in 1753. Giovanni Antonio Scopoli established the genus Catalpa in 1777.

The bean-like seed pod is the origin of the alternative vernacular names Indian bean tree and cigar tree for Catalpa bignonioides and Catalpa speciosa, respectively.

== Food source ==
The tree is the sole source of food for the catalpa sphinx moth (Ceratomia catalpae), the leaves being eaten by the caterpillars. When caterpillars are numerous, infested trees may be completely defoliated. Defoliated catalpas produce new leaves readily, but with multiple generations occurring, new foliage may be consumed by subsequent broods. Severe defoliation over several consecutive years can cause death of trees. Because the caterpillars are an excellent live bait for fishing, some dedicated anglers plant catalpa mini-orchards for their own private source of "catawba-worms", particularly in the Southern United States.

== Other uses ==
Catalpa is also occasionally used as a tonewood in guitars.
