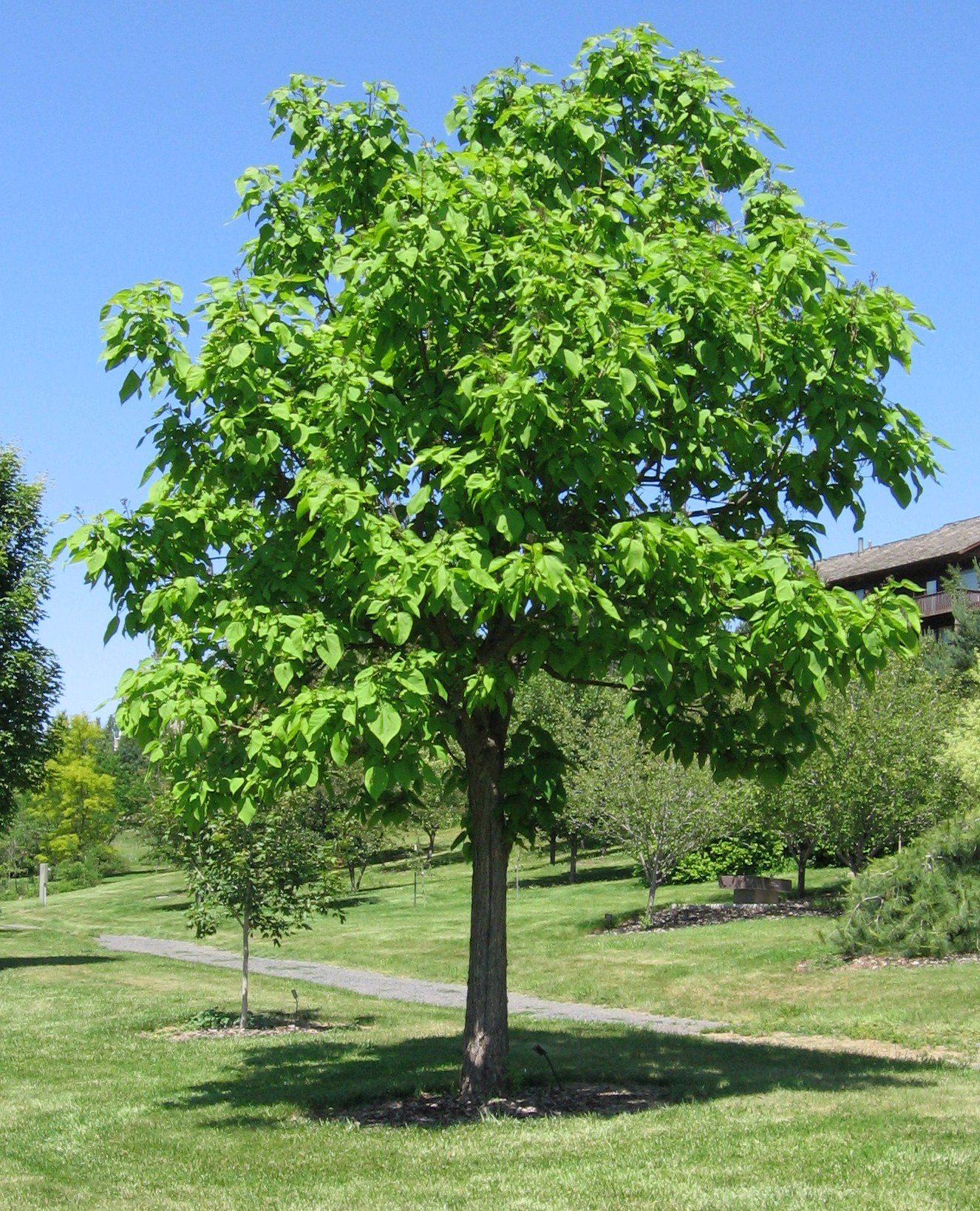

Conservation status
- Apparently Secure (NatureServe)

Scientific classification
- Kingdom: Plantae
- Clade: Tracheophytes
- Clade: Angiosperms
- Clade: Eudicots
- Clade: Asterids
- Order: Lamiales
- Family: Bignoniaceae
- Genus: Catalpa
- Species: C. speciosa

Binomial name
- Catalpa speciosa (Warder) Warder ex Engelm.
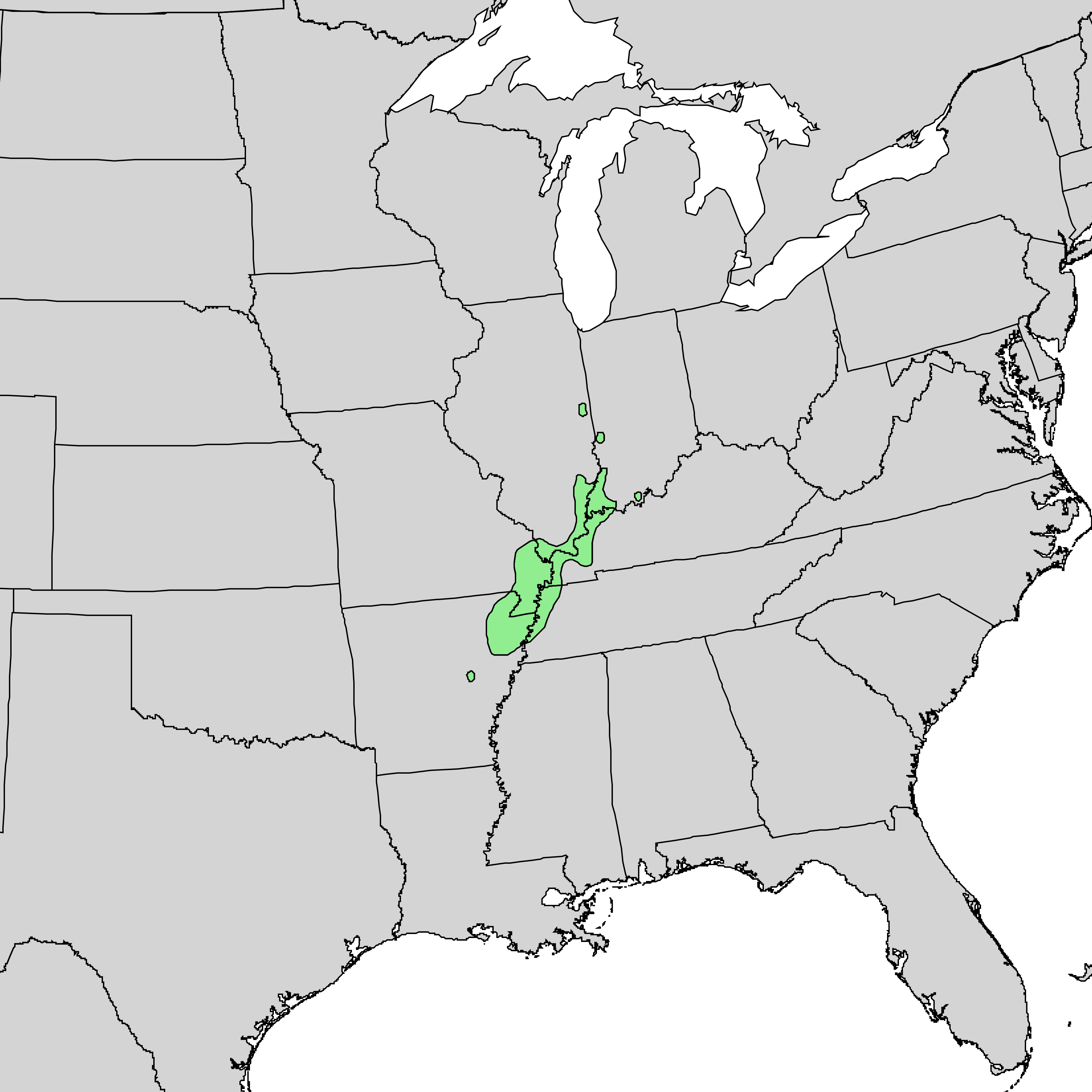
- Natural range of Catalpa speciosa

= Catalpa speciosa =

Northern catalpa

North American species of flowering tree

Catalpa speciosa, commonly known as the northern catalpa, hardy catalpa, western catalpa, cigar tree or catawba, is a species of Catalpa native to the midwestern United States.

The Latin specific epithet speciosa means "showy".

== Description ==
Catalpa speciosa is a medium-sized, deciduous tree growing to 15–30 meters (49–98 ft) tall and 12 meters (39 ft) wide. It has a trunk up to 1 meter (3 ft 3 in) in diameter, with brown to gray flaky bark. Young trees can have very large trunks relative to their size, trunks can be 8 inchs thick for a tree only 12 feet tall.

The leaves are deciduous, opposite (or whorled), large, heart shaped, 18–30 cm (7.1–11.8 in) long and 13–21 cm (5.1–8.3 in) broad, pointed at the tip and softly hairy beneath. The leaves generally do not color in autumn before falling; instead, they either fall abruptly after the first hard freeze, or turn a slightly yellow-brown before dropping off. The catalpa tree is the last tree to grow leaves in the spring. The winter twigs of northern catalpa are like those of few other trees, having sunken leaf scars that resemble suction cups. Their whorled arrangement (three scars per node) around the twigs is another diagnostic.

The flowers are 3–6 cm (1.2–2.4 in) across, trumpet shaped, white with yellow stripes and purple spots inside; they grow in panicles of 10–30.

The fruit is a long, thin legume-like capsule, 20–40 cm (7.9–15.7 in) long and 10–12 mm (0.39–0.47 in) in diameter; it turns brown in the fall and often stays attached to tree during winter (and can be mistaken for brown icicles). The pod contains numerous flat, light brown seeds with two papery wings.

The northern catalpa is closely related to southern catalpa, and can be distinguished by the flowering panicles, which bear a smaller number of larger flowers, and the slightly broader seed pods.

== Distribution ==
Catalpa speciosa was originally thought to be native only to a small area of the midwestern United States near the confluence of the Mississippi and Ohio Rivers. However, in 1976, investigation of an archeological site of an island in West Virginia's portion of the Ohio River revealed Catalpa speciosa to be present on the island around the period of 1500–1700 CE. This suggests that Catalpa speciosa may have experienced a decline in range before European settlement. Today, its range has widely expanded east of the Rocky Mountains outside of its restricted pre-settlement location, further obscuring its true native range.

== Cultivation and uses ==
It is widely planted as an ornamental tree. It is adapted to moist, high pH soil and full sun, but has been able to grow almost anywhere in North America. In the UK it has gained the Royal Horticultural Society's Award of Garden Merit (confirmed 2017).

The wood is soft, like white pine, and light, weighing only 26 pounds per cubic foot when dry. It also does not rot easily; in earlier years it was used for fence posts and less than successfully as railroad ties. More modern uses that highlight the wood's appealing grain include furniture, interior trim and cabinetry. Catalpa has one of the lowest shrinkage/expansion rates of any U.S. hardwood. Only northern white cedar and redwood have lower shrinkage/expansion rates, and not by much. The wood's unique properties make it excellent for carving and boatbuilding. Often regarded as a weed tree, its wood is under-appreciated and underused. The tree's tendency to grow crooked does not help its reputation as a source of usable lumber.

Northern catalpa has been extensively cultivated in Ohio for over 200 years, and is now naturalized in urban and rural areas. Farmers introduced the rapidly growing northern catalpa to Ohio to produce large amounts of timber for fenceposts.

Three liabilities exist in urban areas where it is found as both a shade and an ornamental tree. Northern catalpa rains down fragments of its long fruits and fringed seeds from winter through spring, creating a cleanup chore. In addition, it often gets far too big for its allocated space in the landscape, and crowds out or casts too much shade on other desirable plants. Finally, its brittle wood, coupled with tree height, makes its branches at times subject to wind or ice damage.

The tree is often sought out by fishing enthusiasts, not for the plant itself, but for a common parasite that is used as bait. The catalpa moth caterpillar, Ceratomia catalpae, is widely regarded as one of the best live baits, and the tree may be planted strictly for this purpose, and has earned the tree common names of worm tree, or bait tree.

== Diseases ==
Although northern catalpa can have several diseases and pests, most are usually minor and pose no serious threat. The exception is the caterpillar of Ceratomia catalpae, which can on occasion defoliate the tree, although without causing the tree much harm.

== Gallery ==
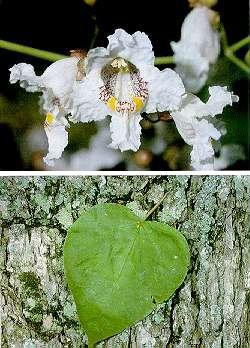
Flowers, leaf and bark

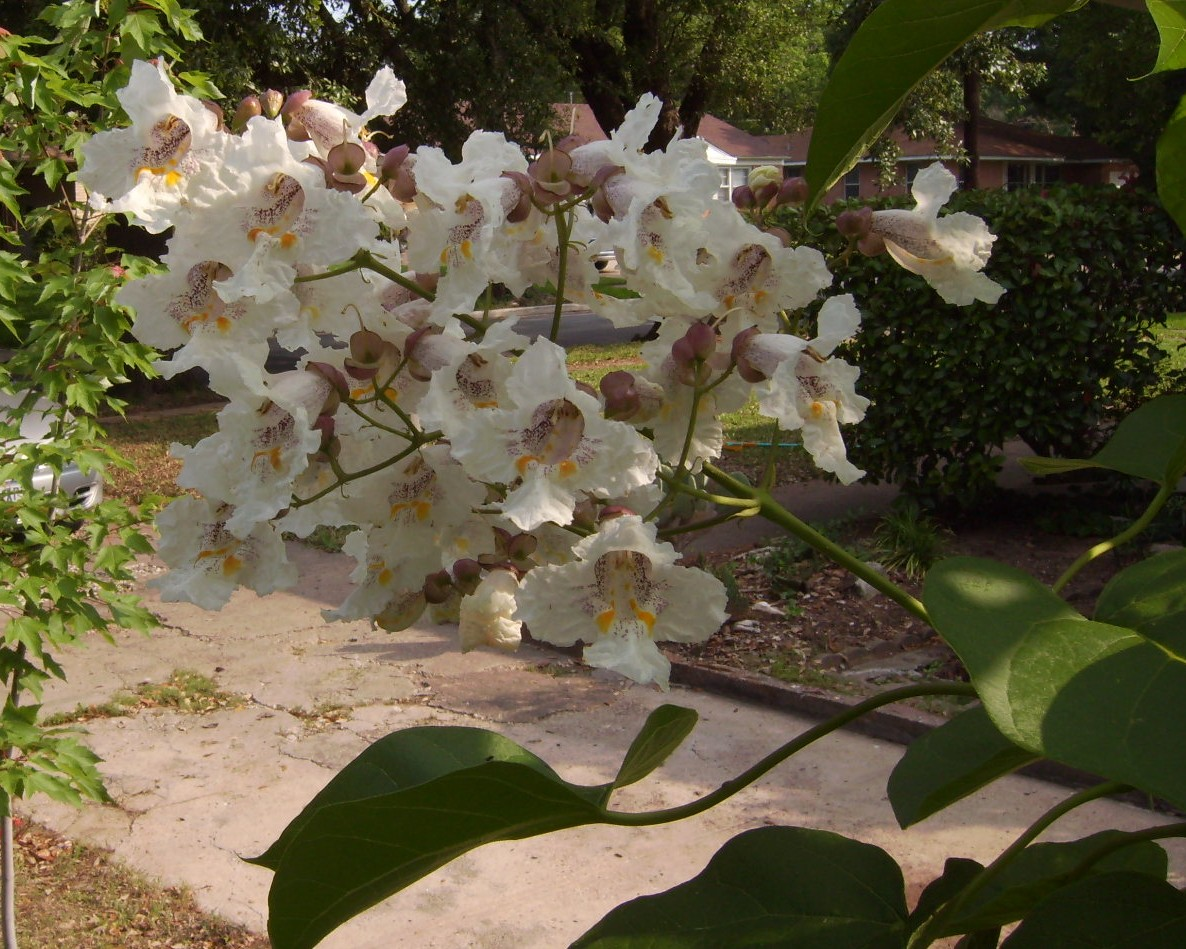
A flowering Northern Catalpa in Dallas, Texas.

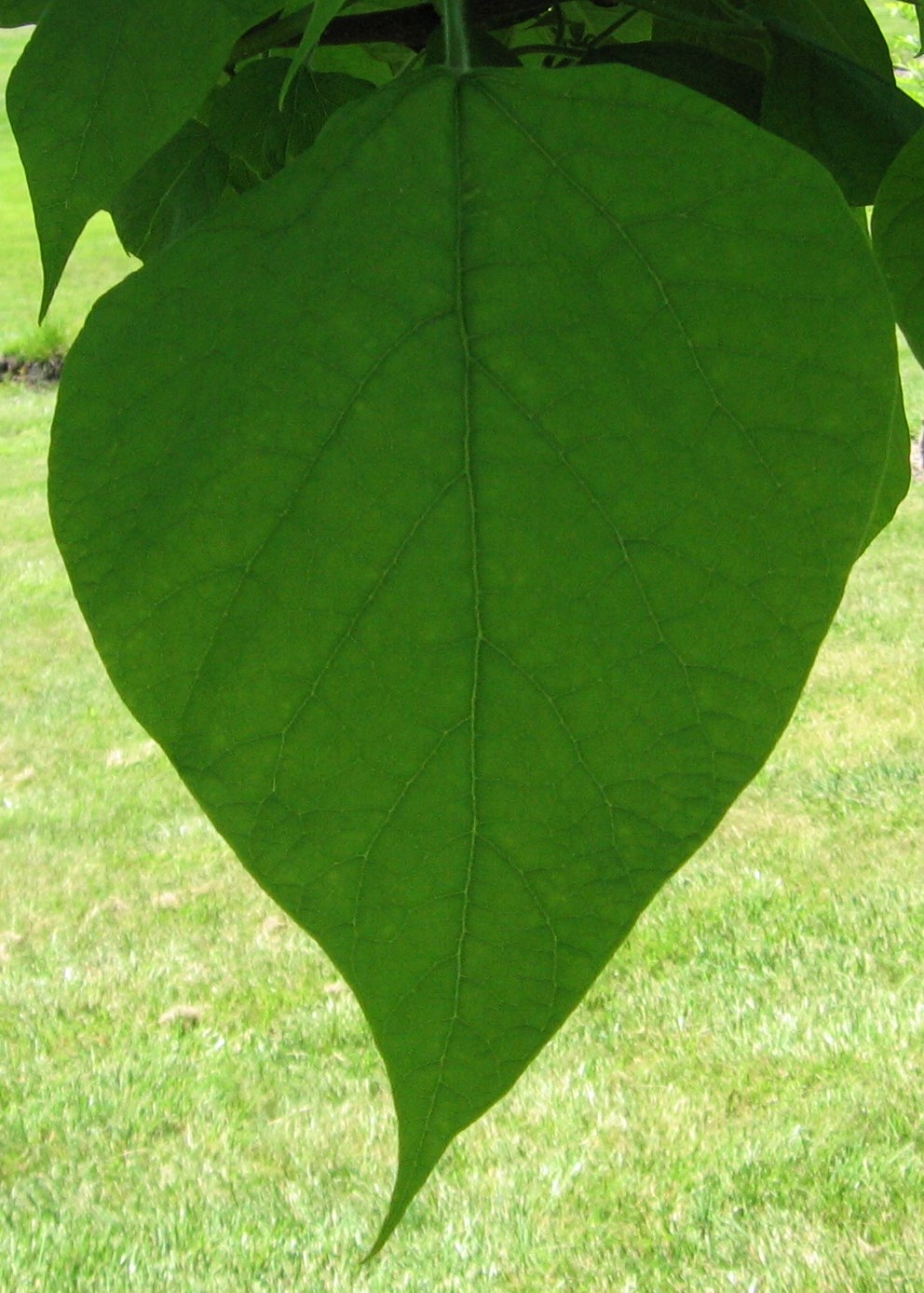
Closeup of a leaf

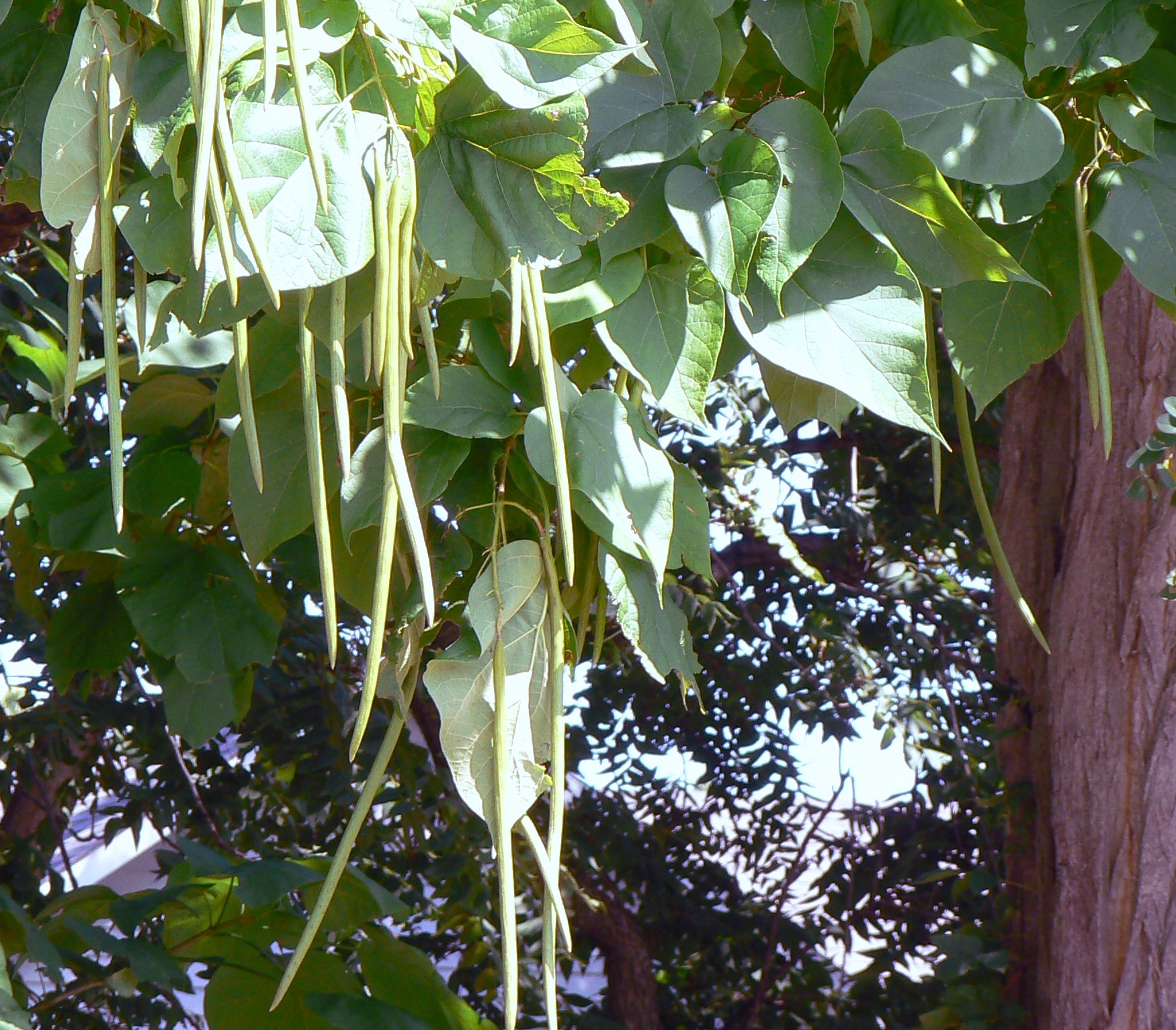
Bean-like seed pods and leaves of the Northern Catalpa

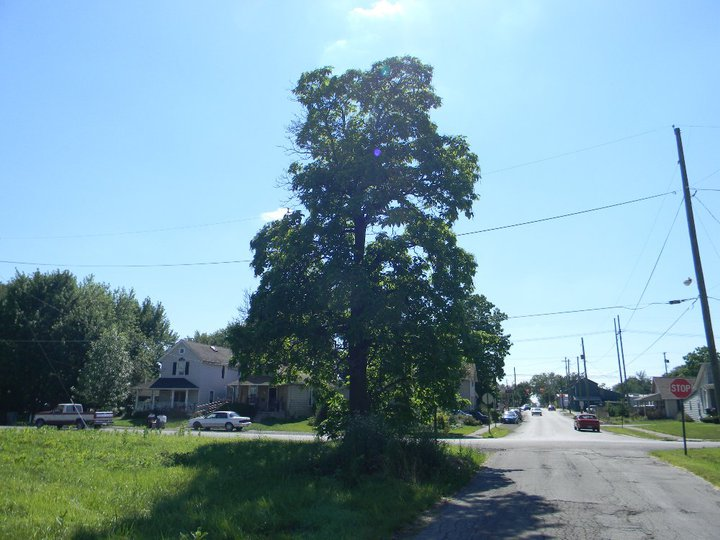
Northern Catalpa in Ohio

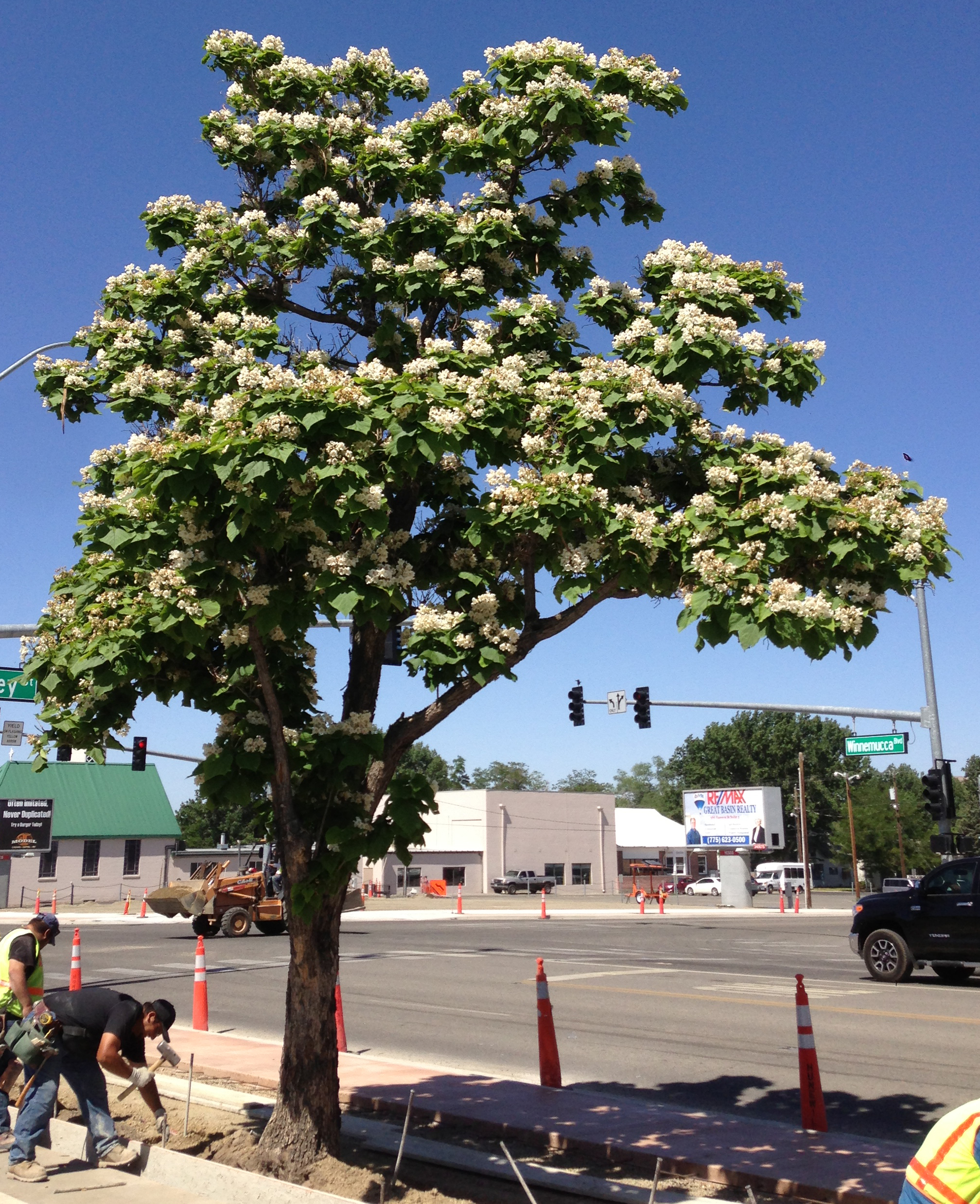
Tree in flower in Winnemucca, Nevada

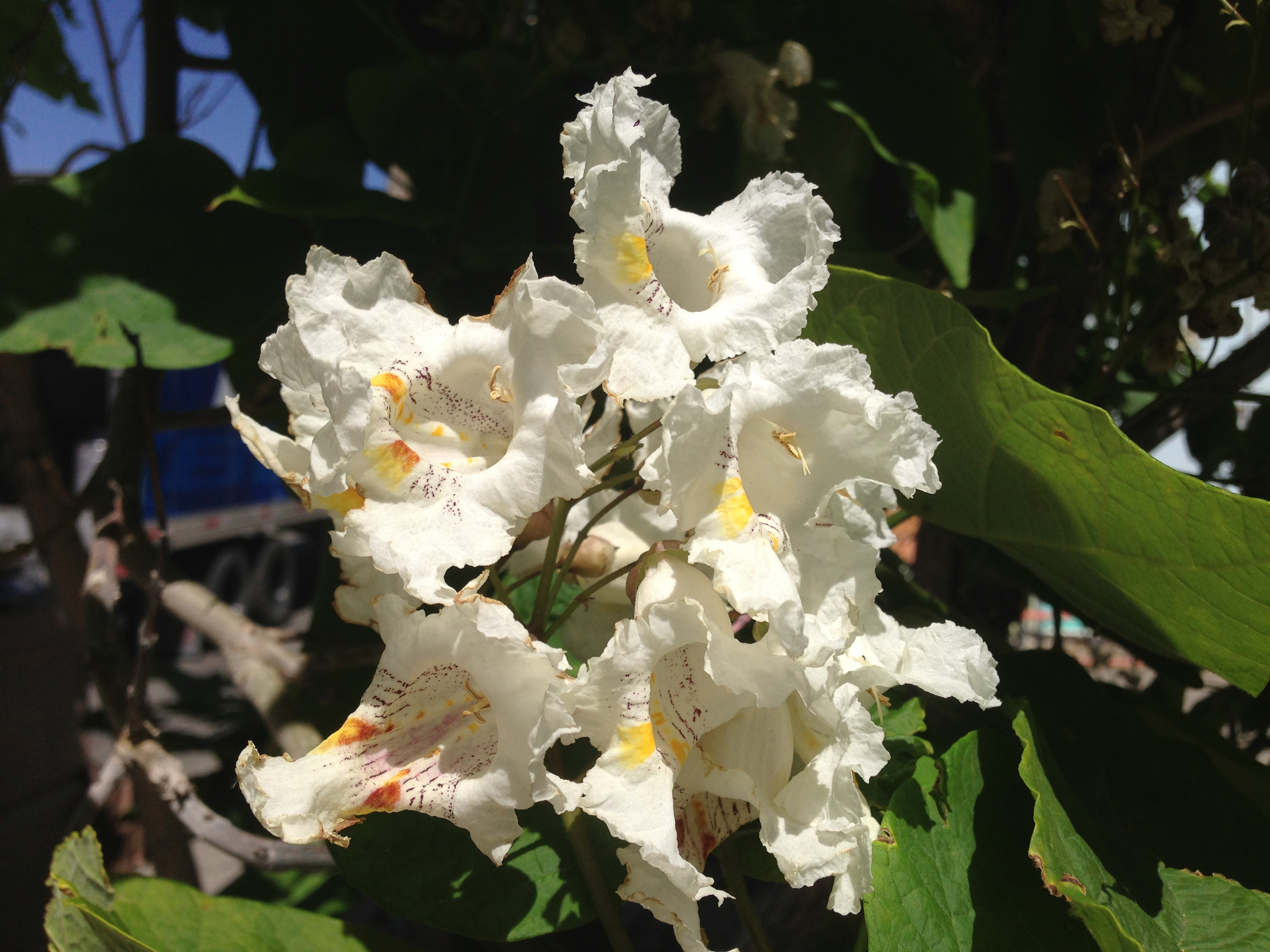
Flowers in Winnemucca, Nevada
