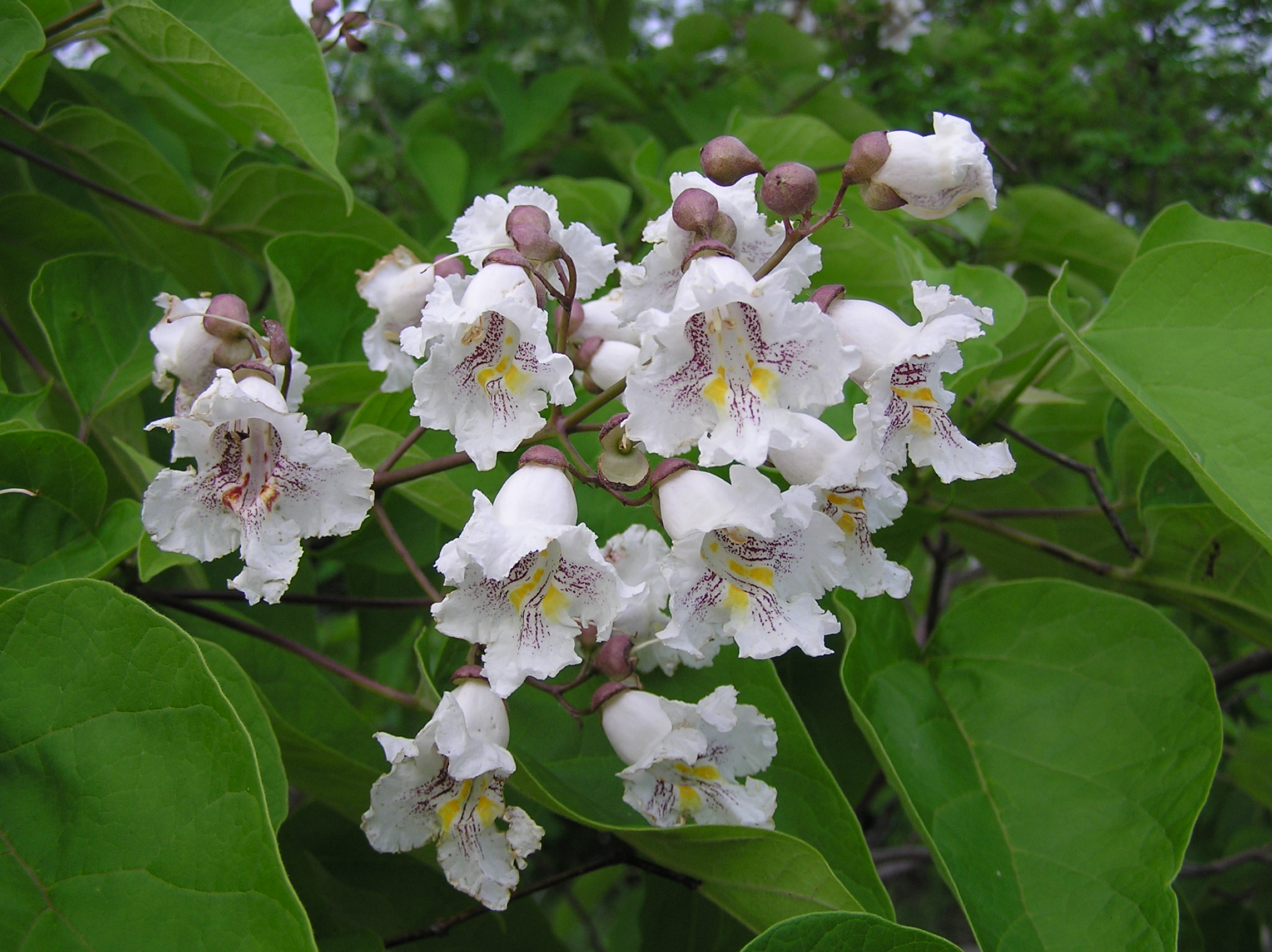

Conservation status
- Data Deficient (IUCN 3.1)

- Apparently Secure (NatureServe)

Scientific classification
- Kingdom: Plantae
- Clade: Embryophytes
- Clade: Tracheophytes
- Clade: Spermatophytes
- Clade: Angiosperms
- Clade: Eudicots
- Clade: Asterids
- Order: Lamiales
- Family: Bignoniaceae
- Genus: Catalpa
- Species: C. bignonioides

Binomial name
- Catalpa bignonioides Walter
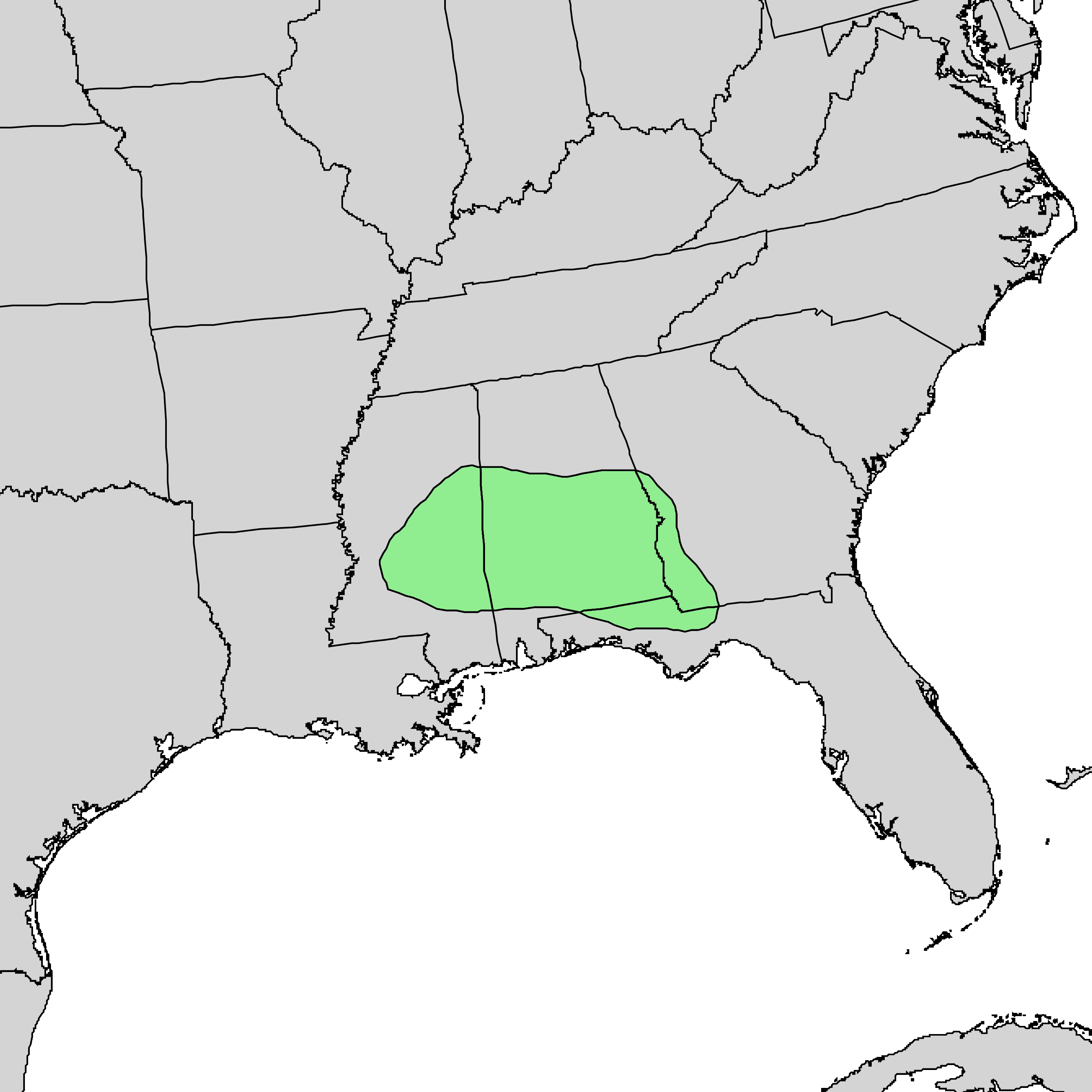
- Natural range

= Catalpa bignonioides =

Species of tree

Catalpa bignonioides is a short-lived species of Catalpa that is native to the southeastern United States in Alabama, Florida, Georgia, Louisiana, and Mississippi. Common names include southern catalpa, cigartree, and Indian bean tree It is commonly used as a garden and street tree.

== Description ==
Catalpa bignonioides is a deciduous tree growing to 25–40 feet (7.6–12.2 m) tall with an equal or greater spread, with a trunk up to 1 metre (3 ft 3 in) diameter, with brown to gray bark, maturing into hard plates or ridges. The short thick trunk supports long and straggling branches which form a broad and irregular head. The roots are fibrous and branches are brittle, its juices are watery and bitter tasting.

The leaves are large, bright green and heart shaped, being 20–30 cm (8–12 in) long and 15–20 cm (6–8 in) broad. They appear late, and as they are full-grown before the flower clusters open, they add much to the beauty of the blossoming tree. They secrete nectar, a most unusual characteristic for leaves, by means of groups of tiny glands in the axils of the primary veins. The nectar secretion starts a week before the tree's flowers bloom and up to ten days after the blooming stops.

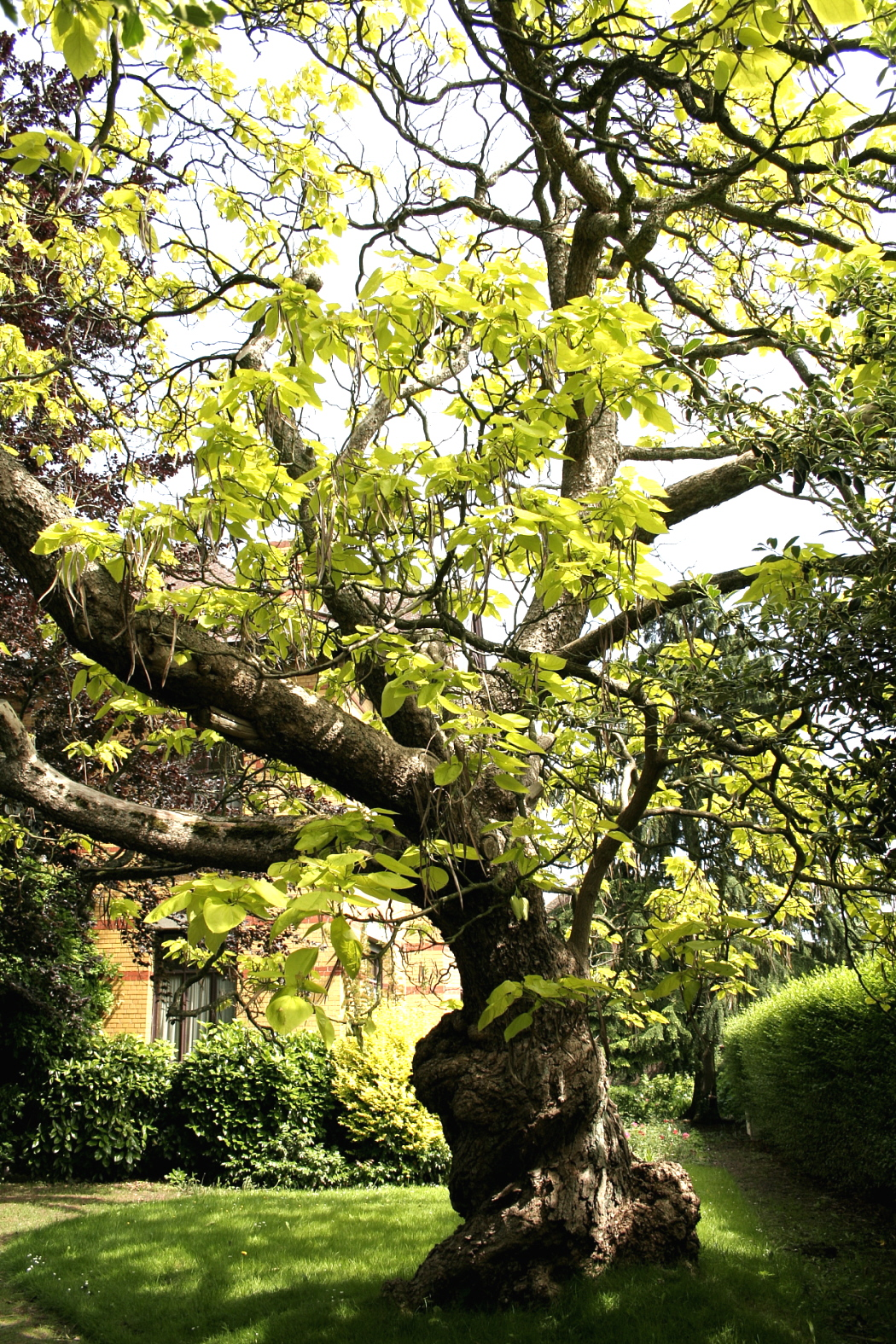
C. bignonioides 'Aurea'

The flowers are 2.5–4 cm across, trumpet shaped, white with yellow spots inside; they grow in panicles of 20–40. In the northern states of the USA, it is a late bloomer, putting forth great panicles of white flowers in June or early in July when the flowers of other trees have mostly faded. These cover the tree so thickly as almost to conceal the full-grown leaves. The general effect of the flower cluster is a pure white, but the individual corolla is spotted with purple and gold, and some of these spots are arranged in lines along a ridge, so as to lead directly to the nectar within. A single flower when fully expanded is 5 cm (2 in) long and 40 mm (1 1/2 in) wide. It is two-lipped and the lips are lobed, two lobes above and three below, as is not uncommon with such corollas. The flower is perfect, possessing both stamens and pistils; nevertheless, the law of elimination is at work and of the five stamens that are expected to be found, three have aborted, ceased to bear anthers and have become filaments simply. Then, too, the flowers refuse to be self-fertilized. Each flower has its own stamens and its own stigma but the lobes of the stigma remain closed until after the anthers have opened and discharged their pollen; after they have withered and become effete then the stigma opens and invites the wandering bee. The entire Pink family behave in this way.

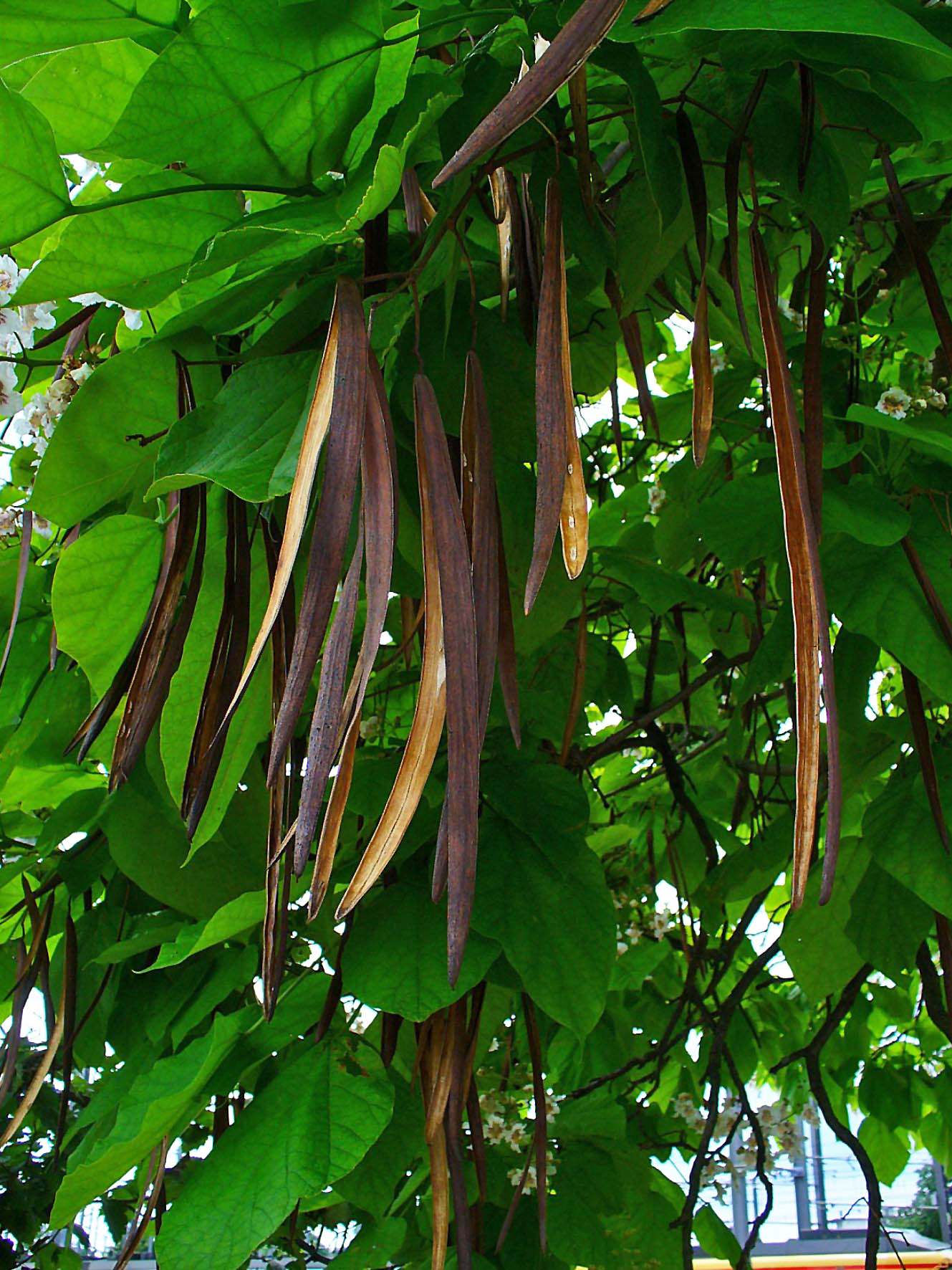
The fruit of the Southern Catalpa resembles bean pods.

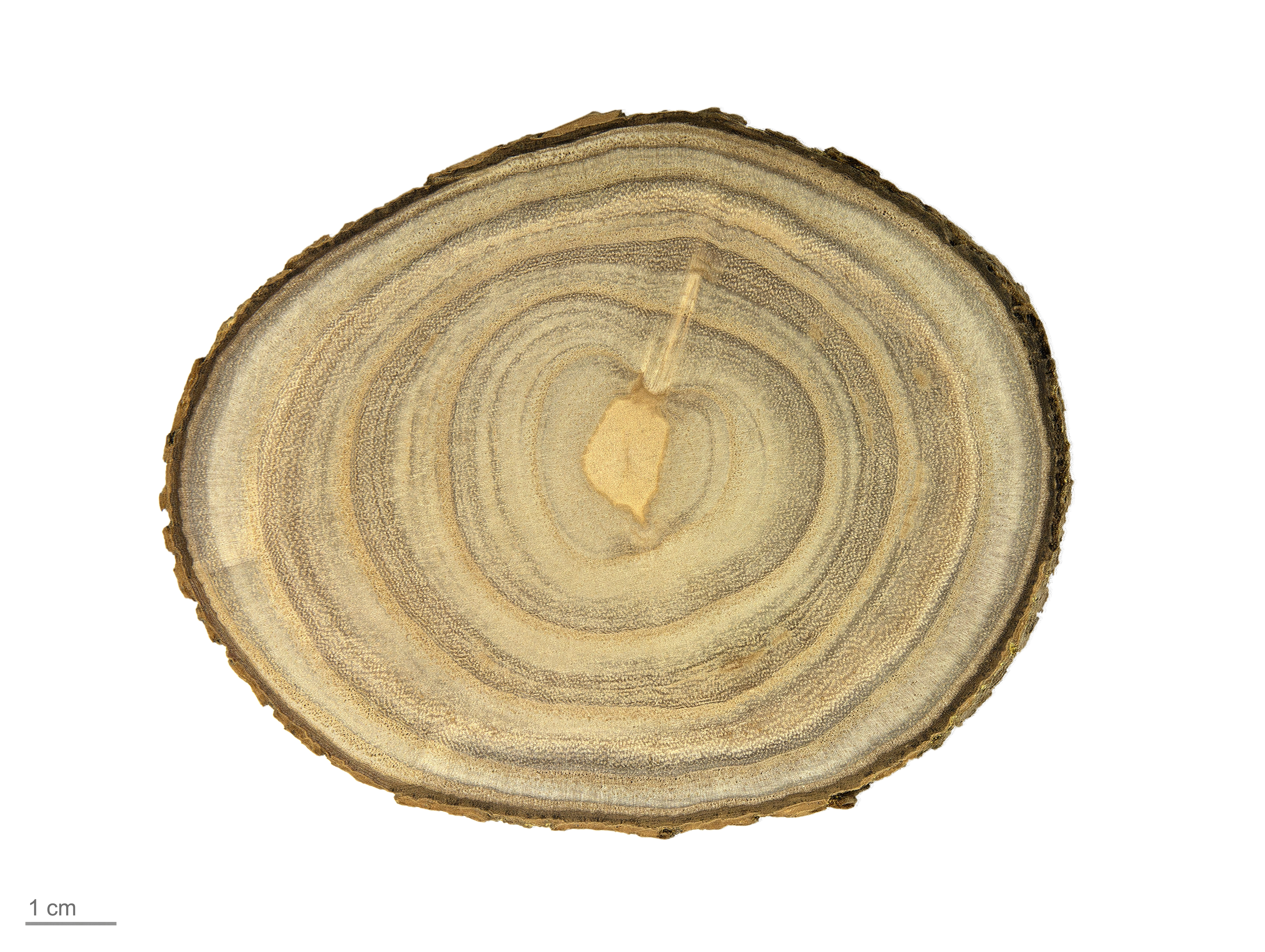
Catalpa bignonioides (MHNT)

The fruit is a long, thin seed pod 20–40 cm long and 8–10 mm in diameter; it often stays attached to the tree during winter. The capsule contains numerous flat light brown seeds with two papery wings. Despite its appearance, it is not closely related to true beans.

It is closely related to the Northern Catalpa (C. speciosa), and can be distinguished by the flowering panicles, which bear a larger number of smaller flowers, and the slightly slenderer seed capsules.

- Bark: Light brown tinged with red. Branchlets forking regularly by pairs, at first green, shaded with purple and slightly hairy, later gray or yellowish brown, finally reddish brown. Contains tannin.
- Wood: Light brown, sapwood nearly white; light, soft, coarse-grained and durable in contact with the soil.
- Winter buds: No terminal bud, uppermost bud is axillary. Minute, globular, deep in the bark. Outer scales fall when spring growth begins, inner scales enlarge with the growing shoot, become green, hairy and sometimes 50 mm (2 in) long.
- Leaves: Opposite, or in threes, simple, 150–250 mm (6–10 in) long, four to five broad. Broadly ovate, cordate at base, entire, sometimes wavy, acute or acuminate. Feather-veined, midrib and primary veins prominent. Clusters of dark glands, which secrete nectar are found in the axils of the primary veins. They come out of the bud involute, purplish, when full grown are bright green, smooth above, pale green, and downy beneath. When bruised they give a disagreeable odor. They turn dark and fall after the first severe frost. Petioles stout, terete, long.
- Flowers: June, July. Perfect, white, borne in many-flowered thyrsoid panicles, 200–250 mm (8–10 in) long. Pedicels slender, downy.
- Calyx: Globular and pointed in the bud; finally splitting into two, broadly ovate, entire lobes, green or light purple.
- Corolla: Campanulate, tube swollen, slightly oblique, two-lipped, five-lobed, the two lobes above smaller than the three below, imbricate in bud; limb spreading, undulate, when fully expanded is 40 mm (1 1/2 in) wide and nearly 50 mm (2 in) long, white, marked on the inner surface with two rows of yellow blotches and in the throat on the lower lobes with purple spots.
- Stamens: Two, rarely four, inserted near the base of the corolla, introrse, slightly exserted; anthers oblong, two-celled, opening longitudinally; filaments flattened, thread-like. Sterile filaments three, inserted near base of corolla, often rudimentary.
- Pistil: Ovary superior, two-celled; style long, thread-like, with a two-lipped stigma. Ovules numerous.
- Fruit: Long slender capsule, nearly cylindrical, two-celled, partition at right angles to the valves. 150–500 mm (6–20 in) long, brown; hangs on the tree all winter, splitting before it falls. Seeds 25 mm (1 in) long, 5 mm (1/4 in) wide, silvery gray, winged on each side and ends of wings fringed.

== Induced defenses ==
A 2003 study by J. Ness showed that when a hawkmoth caterpillar Ceratomia catalpae started eating the leaves of C. bignonoides, the leaves produced extra nectar. The nectar in turn attracted a greater number of bodyguard ants Forelius pruinosus to the damaged leaves, thus giving added protection to the whole plant. This is an example of a tree exhibiting a symbiotic relationship with nearby insects.

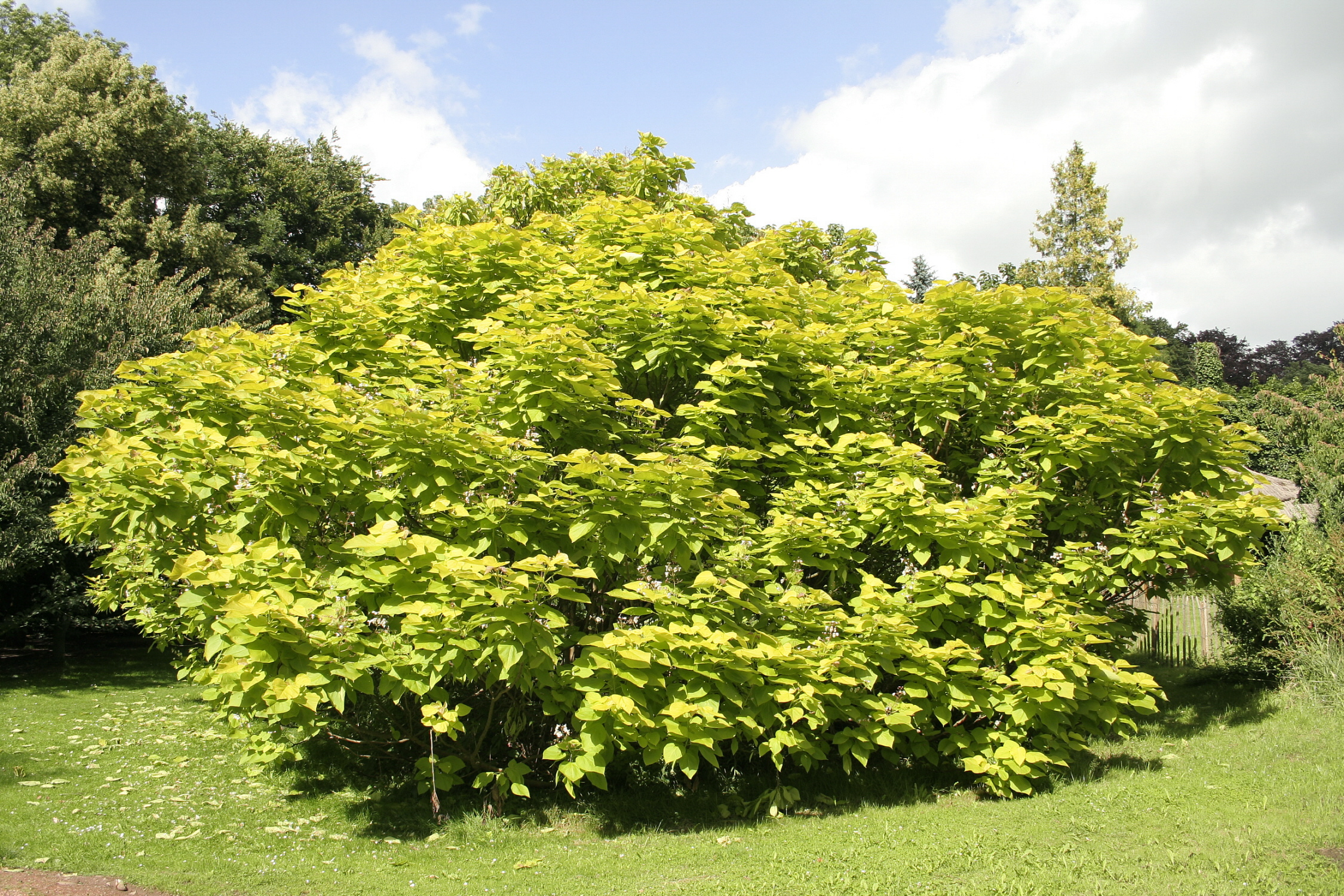
C. bignonioides 'Aurea'

== Distribution ==
In the USA, Catalpa bignonioides is undoubtedly a Southern tree. Europeans first observed the tree growing in the fields of the Cherokee Native American tribes. However, it can flourish in the North as well, and accordingly its original range is somewhat in doubt.

Despite its southern origins, it has been able to grow almost anywhere in the United States and southernmost Canada, and has become widely naturalized outside its restricted native range.

== Cultivation and uses ==
It is a fast-growing tree and widely grown as an ornamental tree. The catalpa has the distinction of bearing some of the showiest flowers of all the American native trees. Its value in this respect has long been recognized and it holds an assured place in the parks and gardens of all temperate countries. It has gained the Royal Horticultural Society's Award of Garden Merit, as has the gold-leafed cultivar C. bignonioides 'Aurea'. The purple-leaved hybrid Catalpa × erubescens 'Purpurea' syn. C. bignonioides 'Purpurea', has also achieved the award (confirmed 2017).

It prefers moist soil and full sun. It is easily raised from seeds which germinate early in the first season. It also multiplies readily from cuttings. The tree is fairly free from fungal diseases and has few insect enemies.

The wood is brittle and hard, but does not rot easily; it is used for fence posts and railroad ties.

Catalpa bignonioides contains varying levels of iridoid glycosides that deter generalist herbivores, but which are tolerated by and concentrated in Ceratomia catalpae caterpillars. These caterpillars have a longstanding ecological relationship with the tree, and may defoliate a tree three or more times in a summer without killing it. Fishing enthusiasts prize the caterpillars as bait, particularly for catfish, and may freeze them for months after collecting them in the spring.

It is one of two parents of the intergeneric hybrid tree × Chitalpa tashkentensis. The other parent is Chilopsis linearis. The cross was done by a Russian scientist in Tashkent, Uzbekistan. The hybrid is sterile and at least two crosses exist, 'White Cloud' and 'Pink Dawn'.

== History ==
The genus was common in Europe during the Tertiary period. In North America its fossil remains have been discovered in the Miocene rocks of the Yellowstone River.
