= S. spinosa =

S. spinosa may refer to:

- Saccharopolyspora spinosa, a bacterium species in the genus Saccharopolyspora
- Scaphiophryne spinosa, a frog species
- Seddera spinosa, a plant species endemic to Yemen
- Sida spinosa, a plant species in the genus Sida endemic to Hawaii
- Smilax spinosa, a climbing flowering plant species in the genus Smilax
- Stasina spinosa, a spider species in the genus Stasina
- Stephanomeria spinosa, a wirelettuce species in the genus Stephanomeria
- Strychnos spinosa, a tree species

== See also ==
- Spinosa (disambiguation)
