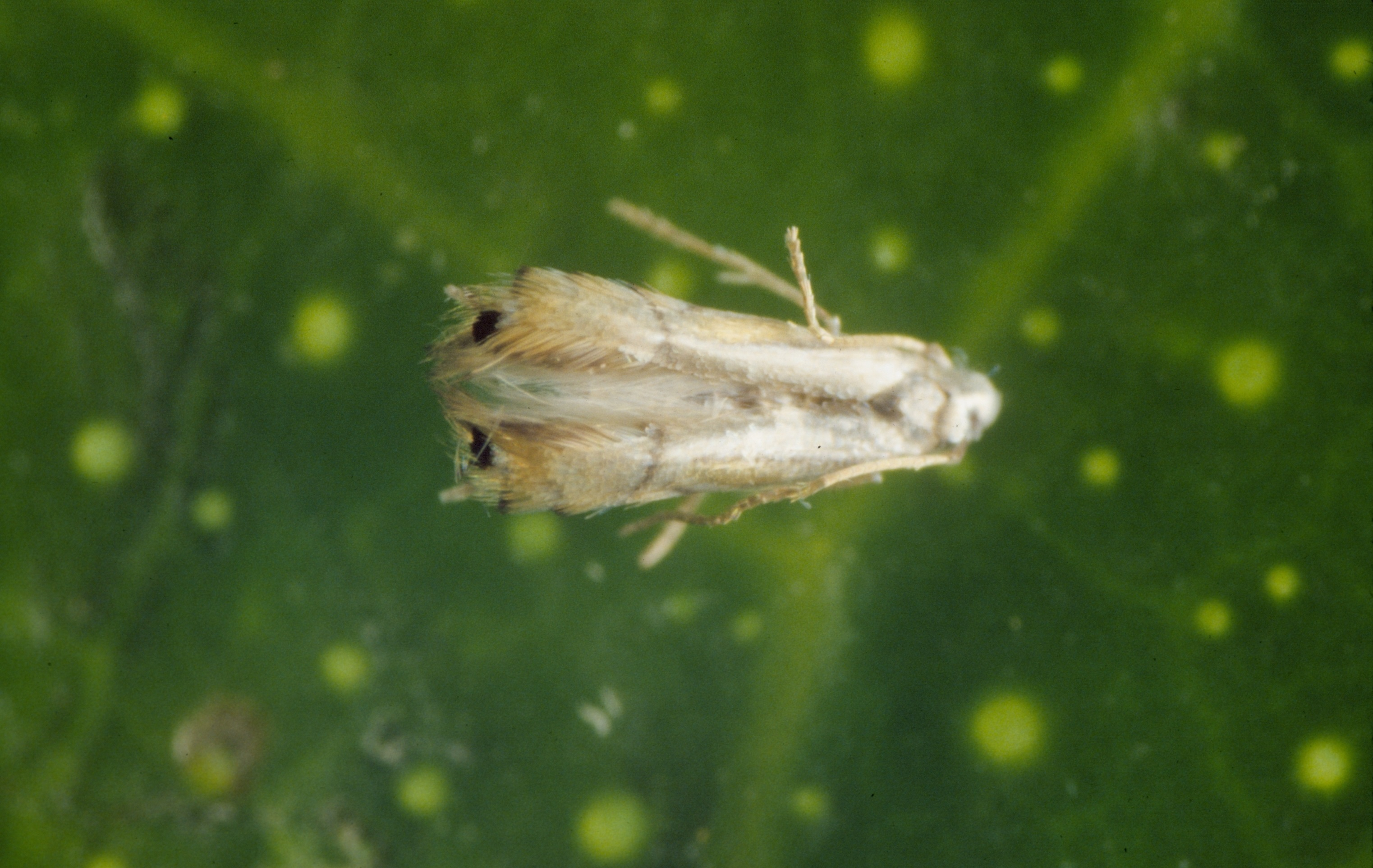

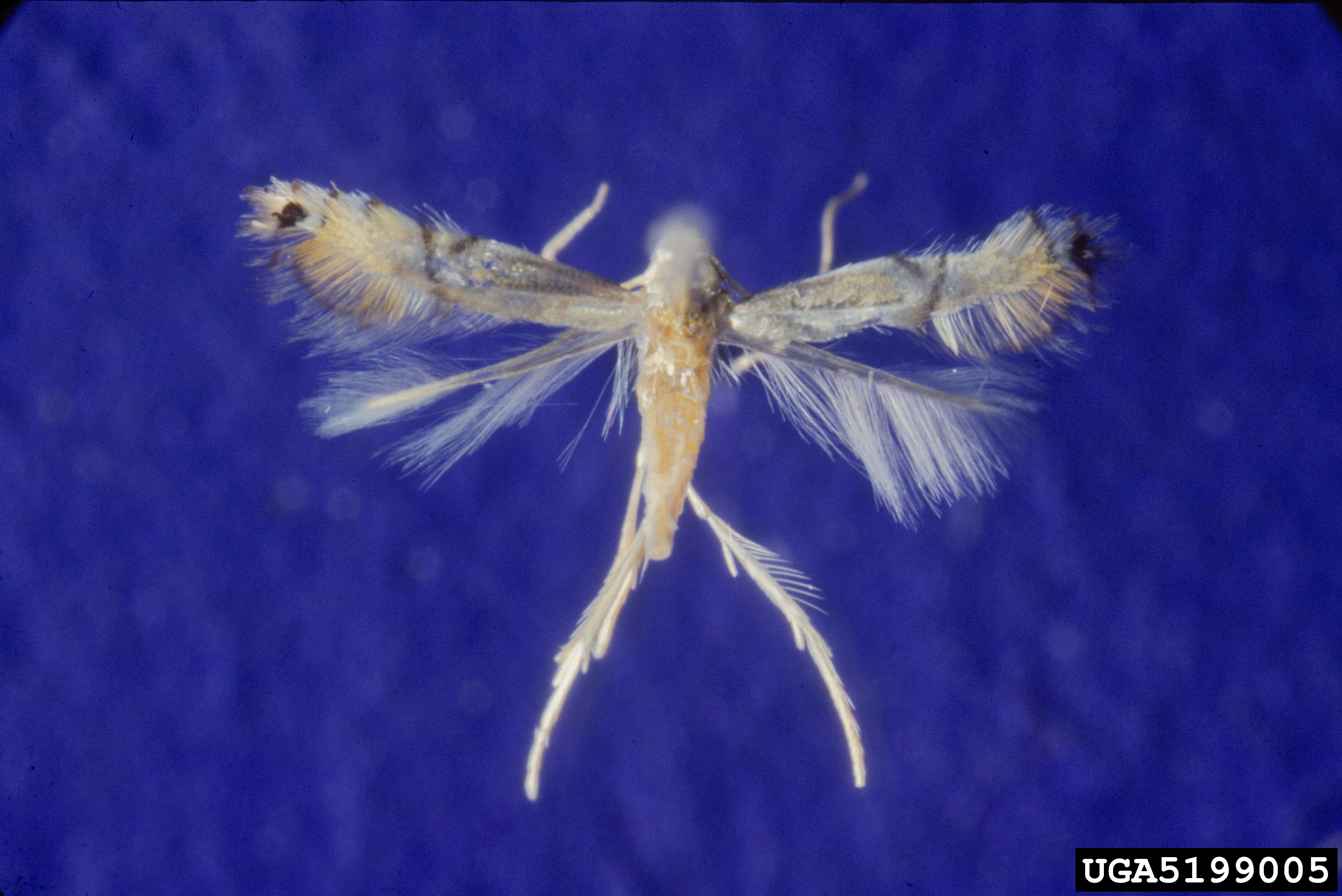

Scientific classification
- Kingdom: Animalia
- Phylum: Arthropoda
- Class: Insecta
- Order: Lepidoptera
- Family: Gracillariidae
- Genus: Phyllocnistis
- Species: P. citrella

Binomial name
- Phyllocnistis citrella Stainton, 1856

= Phyllocnistis citrella =

Species of moth

Phyllocnistis citrella, the citrus leafminer, is a moth of the family Gracillariidae. It is also known as CLM in agriculture. It was described by Henry Tibbats Stainton from India in 1856. It was first found in Florida, United States, in 1993, but is now found all over the world, including Argentina, Australia, Brazil, China, Corsica, Costa Rica, Cuba, India, Israel, Madeira, Malaysia, Mauritius, Mexico, the Philippines, South Africa, Spain, Sri Lanka and other parts of the United States.

The wingspan is about 5 millimetres (0.20 in).

The larvae are considered a serious agricultural pest on Citrus species, such as Aegle marmelos, Atalantia, Citrofortunella microcarpa, Citrus limon, Citrus paradisi, Citrus maxima, Fortunella margarita, Murraya paniculata and Poncirus trifoliate. Larvae have also been recorded on Garcinia mangostana, Pongamia pinnata, Alseodaphne semecarpifolia, Loranthus and Jasminum sambac. They mine the leaves of their host plant. The mine consists of a long epidermal corridor with a well-marked central frass line. The mine is mostly lower-surface, but sometimes upper-surface, and rarely on the rind of the developing fruit. Citrus leaf miner larvae are thus protected from many topic insecticide treatments. Pupation takes place in a chamber at the end of the corridor, under an overturned part of the leaf margin.

== Citrus leafminer distribution ==
Citrus leafminer (CLM) are native to Asia and are found throughout the continent and beyond. Japan, the Philippines, New Guinea, India and Taiwan are some of the countries in which the pest is distributed. The pest is not exclusively found in these countries having spread to nearly every citrus growing area in the world. Recent spread into North and South America was reported in the early 1990s. This is especially important because major citrus growing operations are found in Brazil and the US. These two countries account for half of the world's citrus production.

== CLM management ==
=== Insecticides ===
Insecticide applications are among the most effective methods available for managing CLM. Yet because of the CLM's ability to "mine" leaves insecticides are not entirely effective when dealing with CLM infestations. Cultural control, such as basic citrus tree upkeep and management, are essential to keeping mature citrus trees healthy and capable at combating CLM infestations. While a number of insecticides are used to manage CLM, concerns linger over the type and amount to apply to CLM orchards and nurseries. Some concerns include: wide-spectrum insecticides targeting more than just CLM, killing more than a single insect species this can have adverse effects on beneficial insects that prey on CLM and even beneficial pollinators like bees; insecticide resistance has been reported in certain citrus growing areas; use near residential areas. Insecticides used to manage this pest include but not limited to the following:

| Active Ingredient | Trade Names |
|---|---|
| Abamectin | Agri-Mek 0.15 EC |
| Acetamiprid | Assail 70 WP |
| Diflubenzuron | Micromite 80WGS |
| Thiamethoxam | Platinum 75 SG |
| Spinosad | SpinTor 2SC |
| Spinetoram | Delegate WG |
| Methoxyfenozide | Intrepid 2F |
| Imidacloprid | Admire Pro, 2F |

=== Monitoring and mass trapping ===
Traps specifically designed to lure CLM are also deployed as a mechanism to both monitor and reduce CLM population, although during high infestation situations, traps alone are not recommended without additional measures. They are, however, a good indicator of CLM population levels, which can help in developing effective management plans.

Adult citrus leafminers' mating communication is mediated by sex pheromones emitted by the adult females. A new lure that is environmentally friendly, species-specific, and emits the naturally occurring citrus leafminer pheromone has been developed targeting the management of this pest. The lure attracts adult male citrus leafminers to an insect pheromone trap over a period of 4 to 8 weeks, allowing users to monitor for its presence, determine the relative population density in the field, or use it to actually control populations by mass trapping the males.

=== Mating disruption ===
The CLM sex pheromone can also be used in the field without a trap, as a mating disruption to control and manage the pest. The mating disruption strategy is an environmentally friendly tactic that causes males to fail to find mates, reducing encounters between male and female CLM, leading to less fertilized eggs. The formulation SPLAT CLM, which combines nature-identical pheromone with SPLAT, has been registered with the US EPA to control the citrus leafminer. Unlike wide spectrum insecticides, which may impact beneficial insects (such as bees) or may cause insecticide resistance build-up, these pheromone based strategies rarely cause the development of resistance and reduce the use of conventional pesticides, thus avoiding pollution.

In the case of the citrus leafminer, the female moth produces at least two volatile compounds, a diene (two double bonds: Z,Z)-7,11-hexadecadienal) and a triene (three double bonds: (Z,Z,E)-7,11,13-hexadecatrienal) in a 3:1 triene:diene ratio that are both necessary and sufficient to attract males. It was determined that a 3:1 triene:diene blend of the synthetic pheromone was optimal for attracting males to an adhesive trap in the field in Florida. This is the same 3:1 blend that was first isolated from the female pheromone glands. However, the question of what blend (the "natural" 3:1 blend or some other "unnatural" ratio) was best for mating disruption in general was addressed for this species using geometric multivariate experiment designs combined with response surface modeling. The triene component alone achieved maximum disruption of attraction of males.

=== Attracticides ===
Advances in attractant formulations includes addition of an insecticide ingredient along with pheromone ingredients in order to attract CLM and kill the pest when it contacts the point source.

== Gallery ==
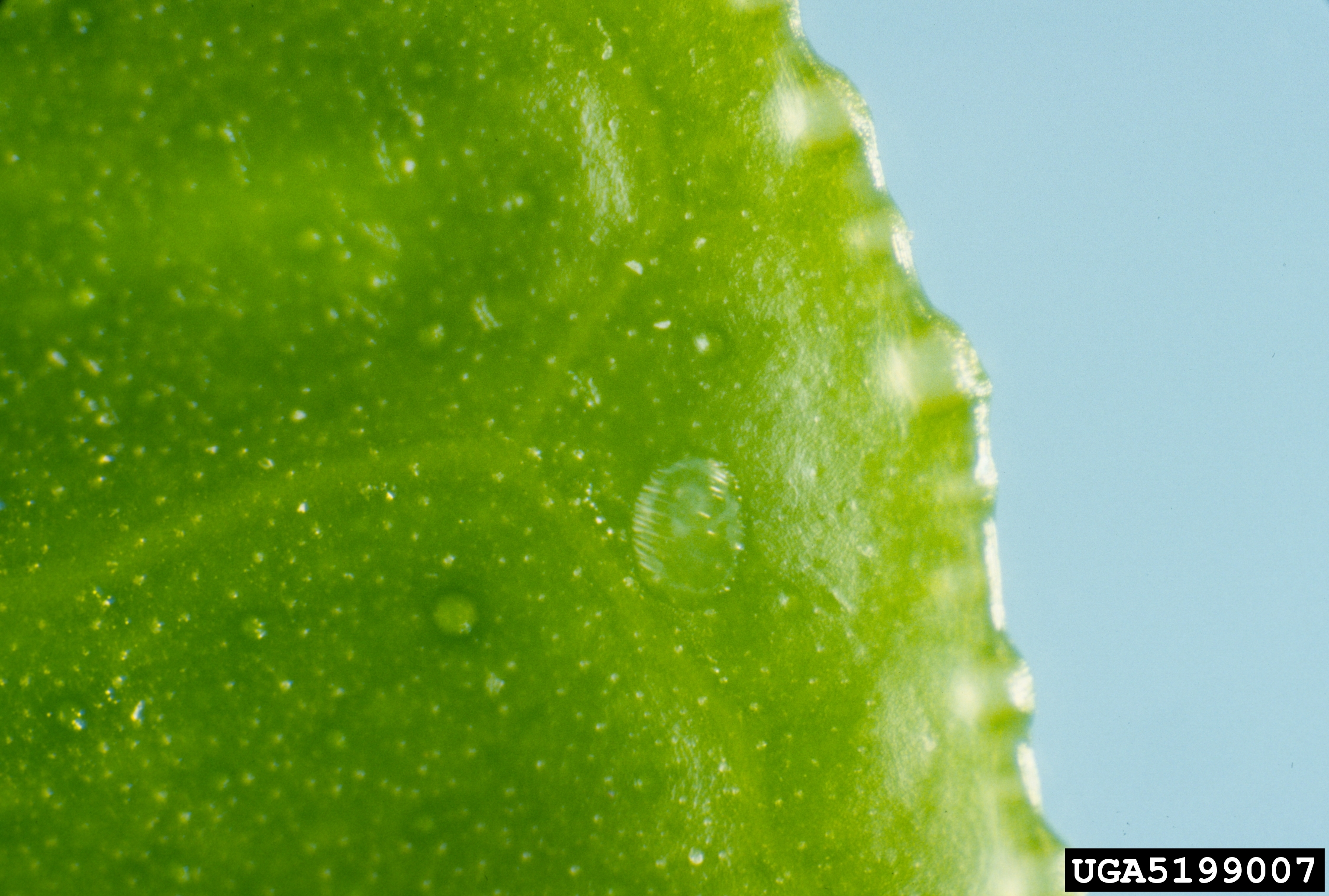
Egg

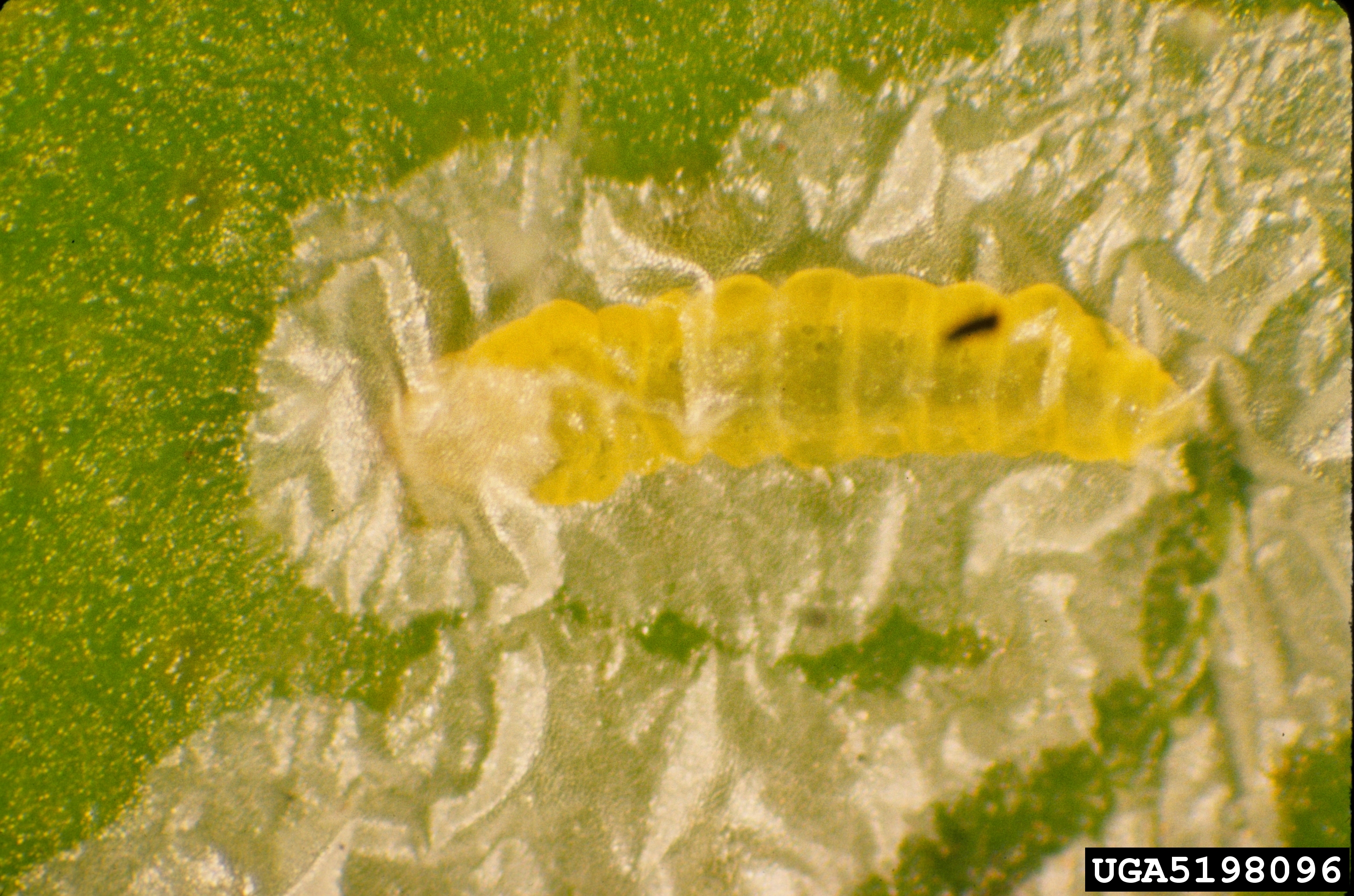
Larva

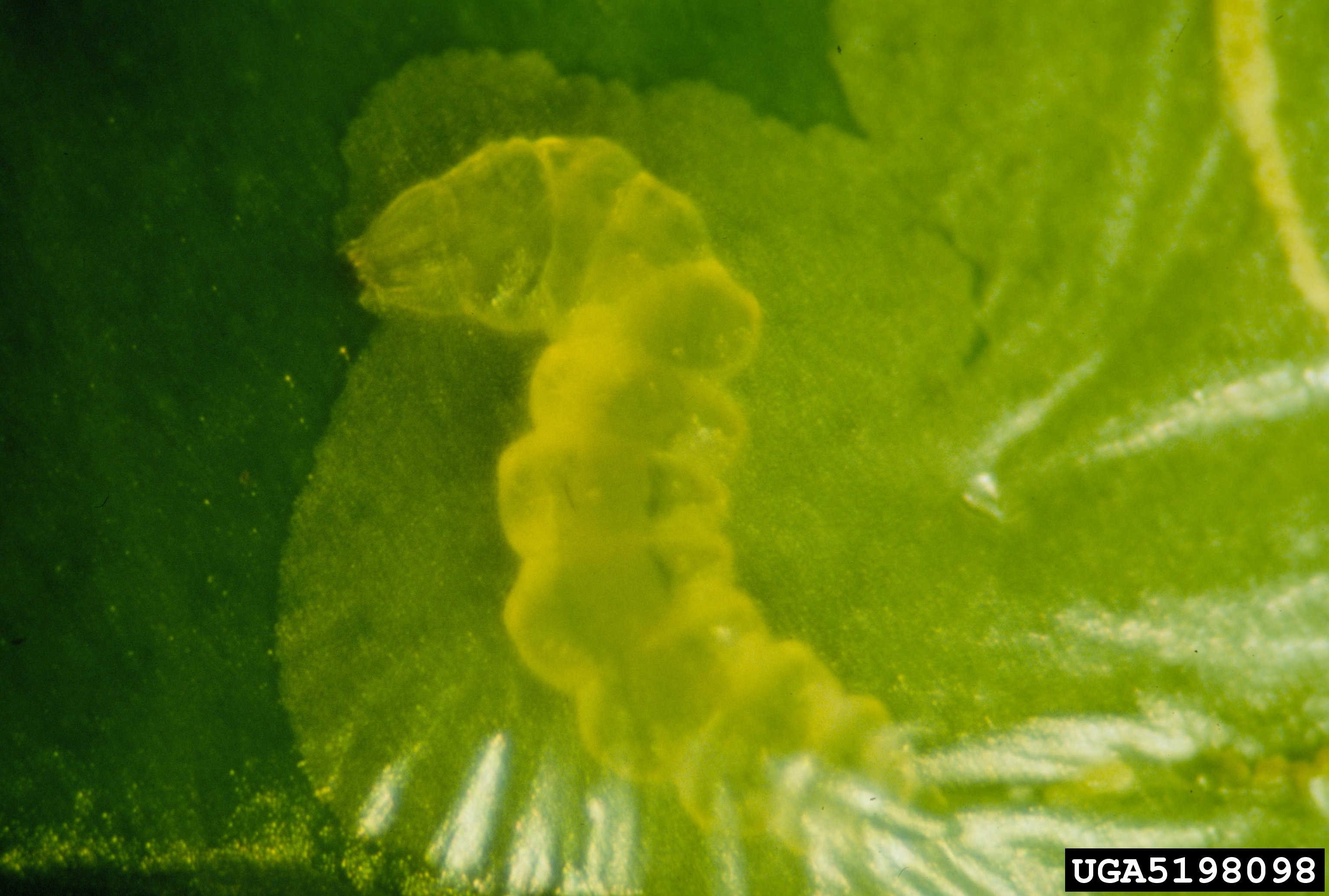
Larva close-up

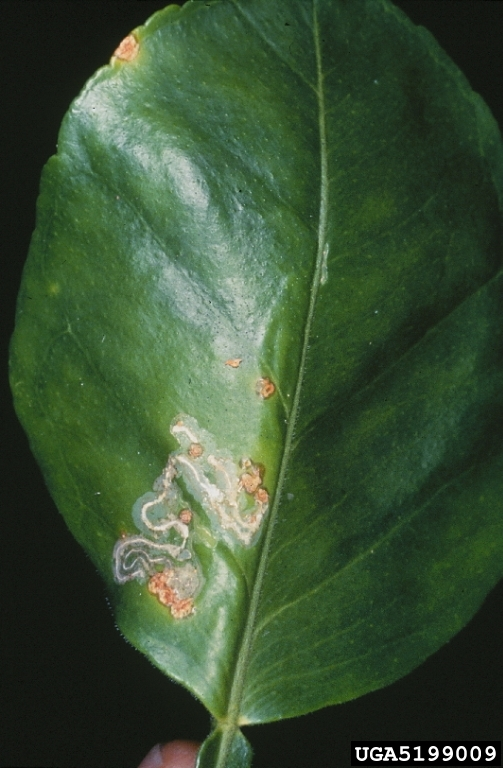
Damage

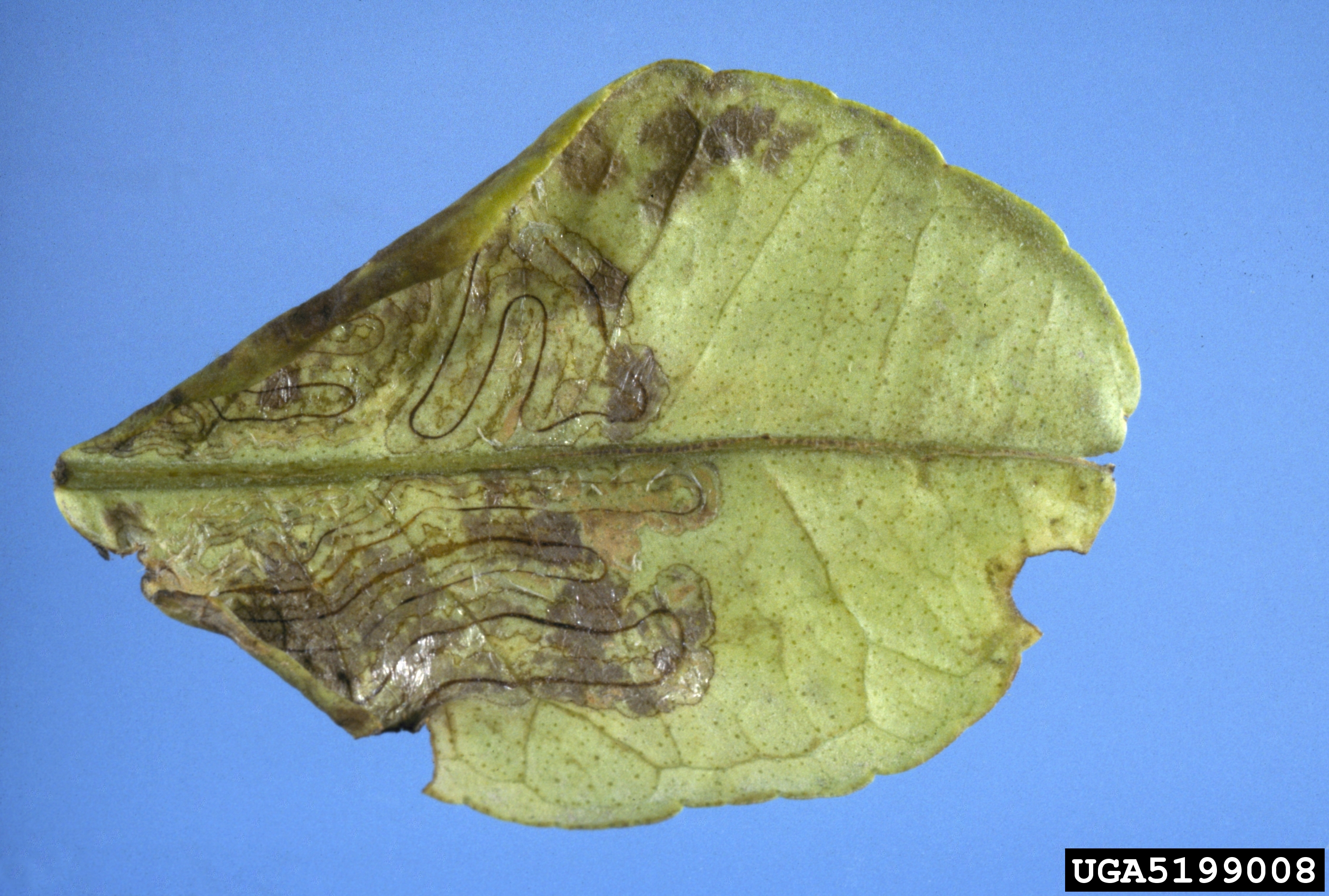
Damage

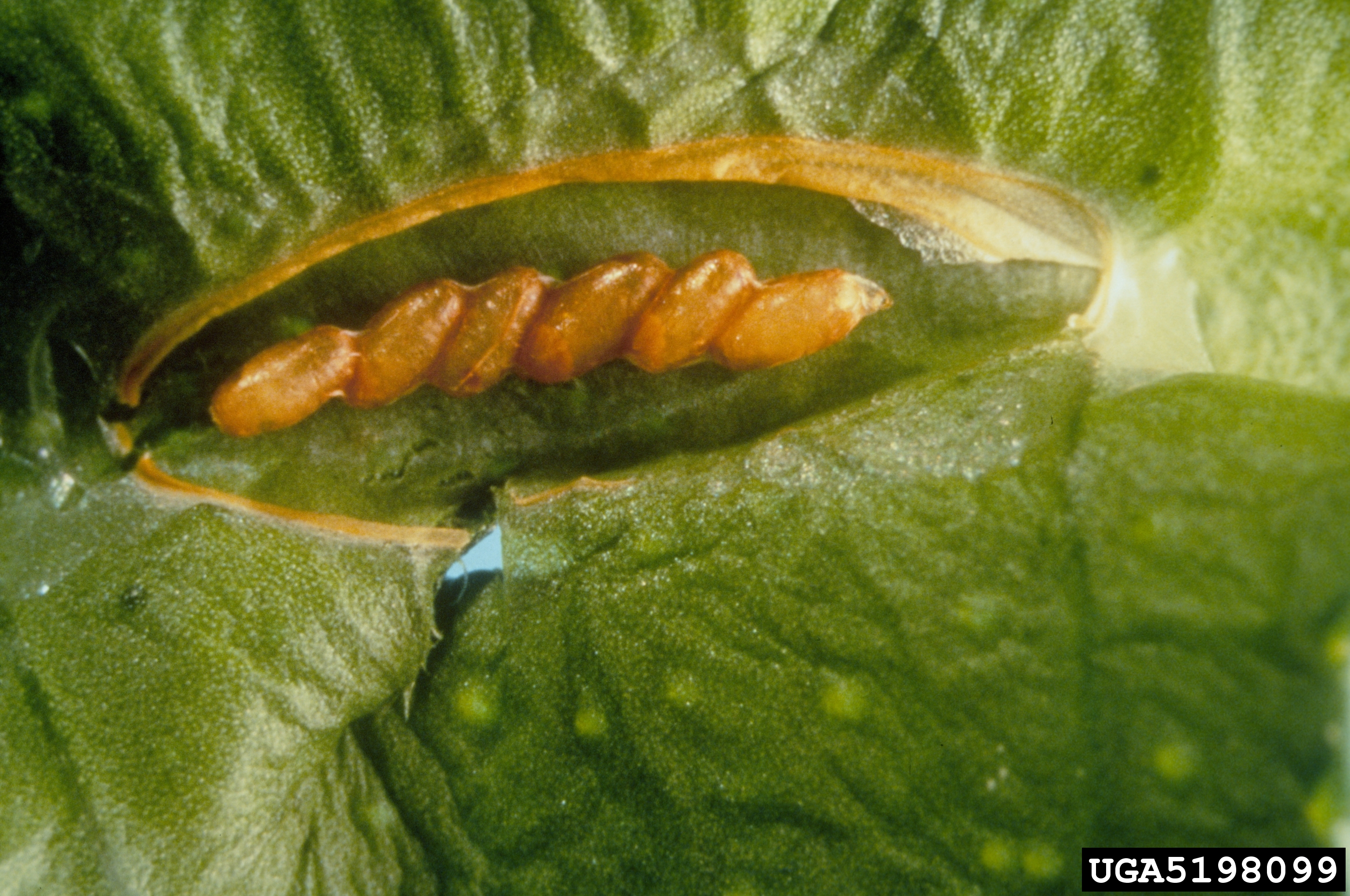
Pupa
