= Saccharopolyspora phatthalungensis =

Scientific classification
- Domain: Bacteria
- Kingdom: Bacillati
- Phylum: Actinomycetota
- Class: Actinomycetia
- Order: Pseudonocardiales
- Family: Pseudonocardiaceae
- Genus: Saccharopolyspora
- Species: S. phatthalungensis

Binomial name
- Saccharopolyspora phatthalungensis Duangmal et al. 2010

Type strain
- BCC 35844, JCM 16708, NRRL B-24798, SR8.15, TISTR 1921

Species of bacterium

Saccharopolyspora phatthalungensis is a bacterium from the genus Saccharopolyspora. It is closely related to Saccharopolyspora shandongensis and Saccharopolyspora spinosa, but was determined to be a unique species in 2010. It was collected by being isolated from rhizospheric soil from the tree Hevea brasiliensis in Phatthalung on Thailand.
