= Suberosis =

- Other names: Corkhandler's disease, corkworker's lung
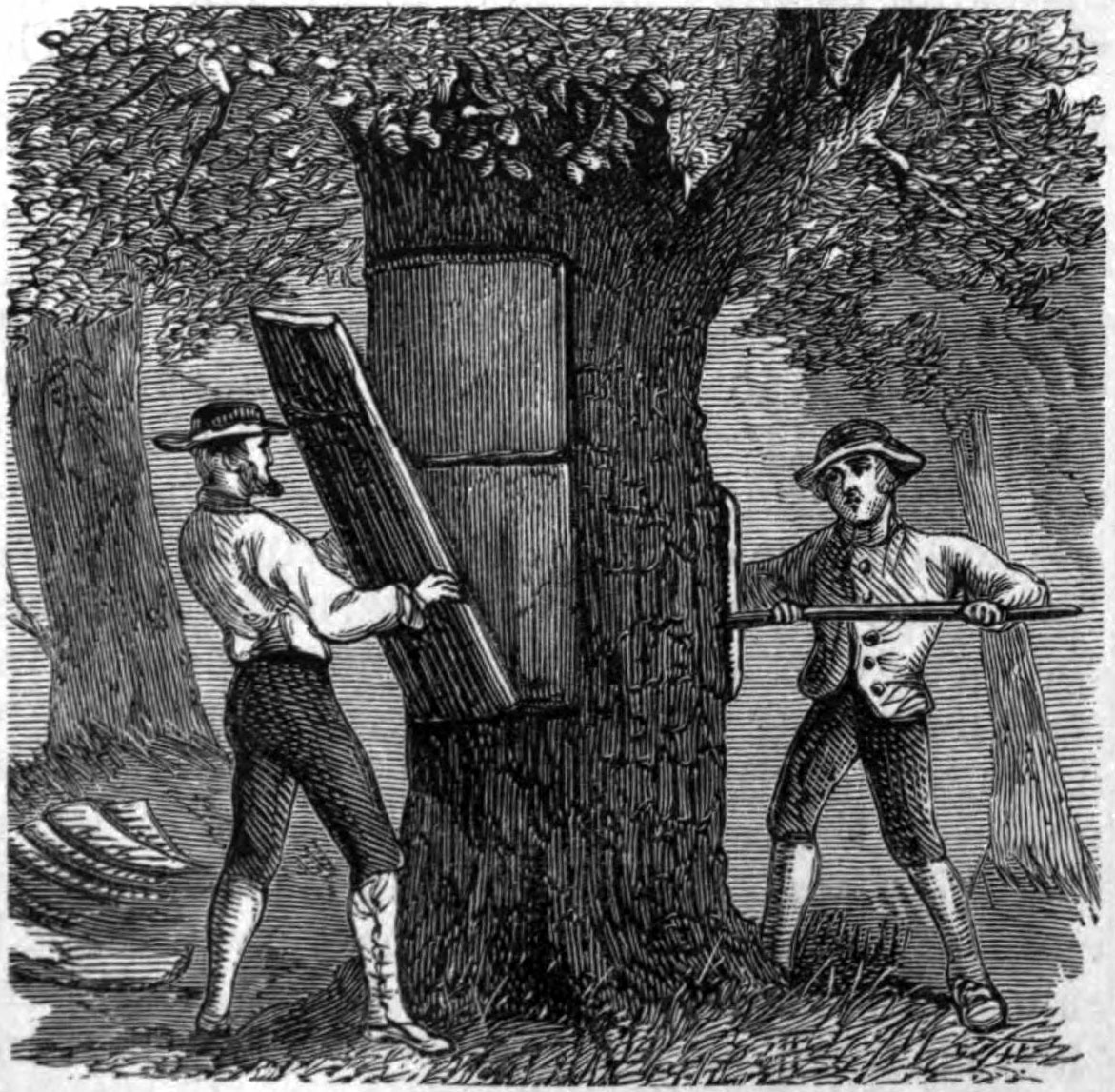
- Cork workers are susceptible to suberosis from breathing in cork dust.
- Specialty: Infectious disease, respirology

Suberosis is a type of hypersensitivity pneumonitis usually caused by the fungus Penicillium glabrum (formerly called Penicillium frequentans) from exposure to moldy cork dust. Chrysonilia sitophilia, Aspergillus fumigatus, uncontaminated cork dust, and Mucor macedo may also have significant roles in the pathogenesis of the disease.

== Cause ==
Cork is often harvested from the cork oak (Quercus suber) and stored in slabs in a hot and humid environment until covered in mold. Cork workers may be exposed to organic dusts in this process, leading to this disease.

== Diagnosis ==
Chest radiography, high-resolution chest CT, pulmonary function testing, bronchofibroscopy with BAL and transbronchial biopsy, delayed cutaneous hypersensitivity tests, fungal and suberin antigen testing, immediate hypersensitivity specific skin tests, and specific bronchial challenge tests can all be used for diagnosis. Chest radiography can show fine miliary mottling. Obtaining a history of antigen exposure and asking about symptoms (e.g. dyspnea, cough) can also be useful.

== Treatment ==
Avoidance of antigen exposure is beneficial.

== History ==
Vinte-e-Um Mendes first reported respiratory disease in Portuguese cork workers in 1947 at the Portuguese Medical Reunion. Cancella d'Abreu first described the disease in 1955.

== See also ==
- Hypersensitivity pneumonitis
