= Bird fancier's lung =

Type of hypersensitivity pneumonitis

- Other names: Bird-breeder's lung, pigeon-breeder's lung, pigeon-fancier's lung
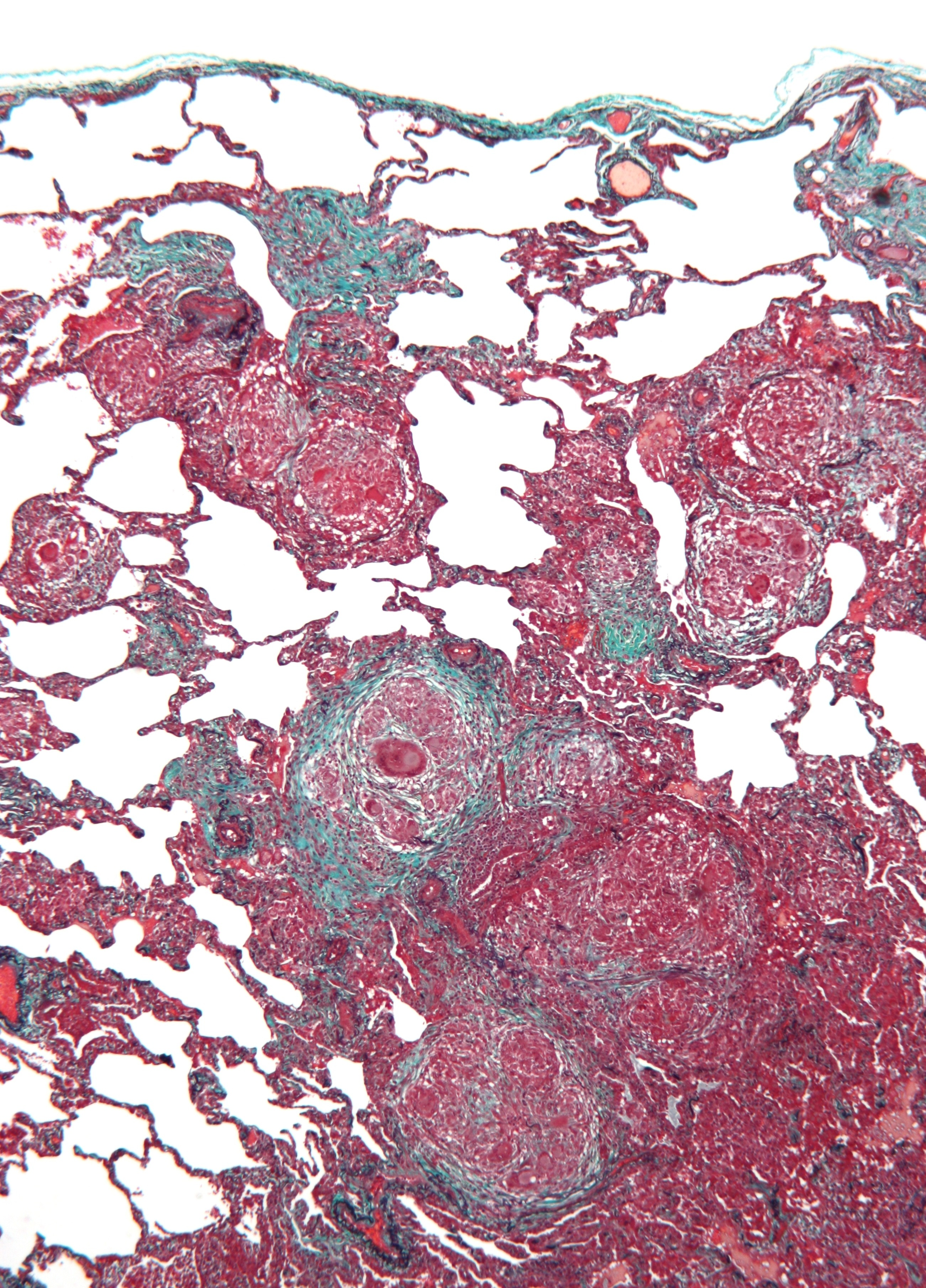
- Micrograph of hypersensitivity pneumonitis, the histologic correlate of bird fancier's lung. Lung biopsy. Trichrome stain.
- Specialty: Pulmonology
- Symptoms: shortness of breath, fever, dry cough, chest pain, anorexia, fatigue
- Complications: pulmonary fibrosis
- Causes: lung inflammation in response to avian protein (from droppings and feathers)
- Diagnostic method: exposure testing, radiology (ground glass appearance)
- Prevention: removing exposure to avian proteins
- Treatment: removing exposure to avian proteins
- Medication: Prednisone

Bird fancier's lung (BFL), also known as bird breeder's lung or pigeon lung, is a type of hypersensitivity pneumonitis. It can cause shortness of breath, fever, dry cough, chest pain, anorexia and weight loss, fatigue, and progressive pulmonary fibrosis (the most serious complication). It is triggered by exposure to avian proteins present in the dry dust of droppings or feathers of a variety of birds. The lungs become inflamed, with granuloma formation. It mostly affects people who work with birds or own many birds.

BFL is diagnosed based on symptoms, and how these get worse on exposure to avian proteins. Radiology can show damage to the lungs, which has a characteristic "ground glass" appearance. Bronchoscopy shows chronic inflammation, with biopsies showing lymphocytosis and granulomatous tissue. BFL may be treated with steroids such as prednisone to reduce inflammation, and removal of exposure to avian proteins. If pulmonary fibrosis has not occurred, treatments tend to be very effective.

== Signs and symptoms ==
Initial symptoms of BFL include shortness of breath (dyspnea), and dry cough. These may be worse after sudden exertion or when exposed to temperature change, which can resemble asthma, hyperventilation syndrome or pulmonary embolism. Chest pain (such as a tight chest), chills, crackly chest, and fever may also occur.

Upon re-exposure to avian proteins, sensitized individuals typically experience symptoms within 4–8 hours. In chronic BFL, symptoms may include anorexia, weight loss, extreme fatigue, and progressive pulmonary fibrosis. Pulmonary fibrosis is generally the most serious consequence of the disease, as it progressively and irreversibly diminishes the lungs' efficiency over time. As a result, affected individuals may have repeated chest infections and ultimately struggle to breathe.

=== Complications ===
Pulmonary fibrosis can get worse over time. This can eventually lead to respiratory failure, which can be fatal. Diffuse alveolar damage (DAD) can occur with acute respiratory failure.

== Cause ==
BFL is caused by an immune response to inhaled allergens from birds, which induce a type III hypersensitivity reaction through the formation of immune complexes within the lung parenchyma. This may be the dry dust of droppings, or feathers. These antigens can come from any bird. BFL may be caused by allergens from pigeons. Allergens may also come from other birds, including parakeets, cockatiels, budgerigars, parrots, turtle doves, turkeys, chickens, and other birds. Antigens can also be from feathers in bedding. People who work with birds or own many birds are at risk. Bird hobbyists and pet store workers may also be at risk.

== Mechanism ==
BFL causes inflammation of the alveoli in the lungs. Avian proteins include mucins and antibodies, which stimulate a significant immune response from the body. The lungs become inflamed, with granuloma formation. It can take many years of exposure to cause BFL, with an average of 1.6 years to cause acute disease, and 16 years to cause chronic disease.

== Diagnosis ==
=== Symptoms ===
A definitive diagnosis can be difficult without invasive testing. Extensive exposure to birds, combined with reduced diffusing capacity, are strongly suggestive of BFL. Symptoms worsen upon skin exposure to avian proteins in 85% of patients. Symptoms tend to occur or worsen within 4–8 hours after exposure to avian protein. Symptoms almost always worsen upon lung exposure to avian protein, and such tests are often performed in hospital in case symptoms become hard to manage.

=== Biochemistry ===
Biochemical results tend to be difficult to pinpoint to BFL, but can support a diagnosis. BFL causes high concentrations of antibodies targeted against avian proteins, although this may also be found in people exposed to avian protein without the disease. These can be detected in a blood test. An inverted CD4+/CD8+ ratio is associated with lymphocytosis.

=== Radiology ===
X-ray or CT scans usually show physical changes to the lung structure (a "ground glass" appearance or a "mosaic" pattern) as the disease progresses. Mediastinal lymphadenopathy and bronchiectasis may also be seen. Precise distribution and types of tissue damage differ among similar diseases, as does response to treatment with prednisone. Up to 12% of x-rays may show no damage, whilst only 2% of CT scans show no damage.

=== Endoscopy ===
Bronchoalveolar lavage typically shows prominent lymphocytosis. This mainly consists of cytotoxic T cells, with an elevated concentration of mast cells. Standard bronchoscopy usually shows chronic inflammation of lung tissue, and granulomas with poorly defined margins.

Lung biopsy usually reveals non-necrotizing granulomatous inflammation. It also shows "foamy" macrophages and crystals of oxalic acid. Hyperplasia tends to occur in type 1 pneumocytes and not in type 2 pneumocytes.

== Treatment ==
=== Removing avian proteins ===
The only recommended long-term treatment is avoidance of the avian proteins that trigger BFL. This can stop the underlying inflammatory response, although symptoms may continue depending on existing damage. It is advisable to remove all birds, and bedding and pillows containing feathers, from the patient's home, as well as any down-filled outerwear and sleeping bags. It is also advisable to wash all soft furnishings, walls, ceilings and furniture, and to avoid future exposure to birds, bird droppings, or any items containing feathers, such as pillows in many hotels.

In extreme cases, patients may be advised to evacuate their homes permanently and to dispose of all possessions that have been exposed to avian proteins if they cannot be cleaned thoroughly inside and out. (This includes books, beds, and upholstered furniture.) The patient should not attempt to clean any contaminated items. Anyone who comes in contact with items that have been near birds should change clothes and wash their hair before coming in contact with the patient.

=== Steroids ===
Corticosteroids, such as prednisone, often suppresses symptoms temporarily, especially in the early stages of the disease. However, corticosteroids tend not to have a long-term effect if avian protein is not also removed from the environment. Dosage is chosen specific to each patient. By reducing inflammation, corticosteroids might also delay fibrosis in the lungs.

== Prognosis ==
Unless fibrosis has progressed beyond recovery, symptoms should improve, sometimes dramatically, in the absence of such allergens. Depending on the extent of fibrosis at the time of their diagnosis and how well they follow recommended treatment protocols (especially avoidance of allergens), many BFL patients make a full recovery. However, symptoms may recur quickly upon re-exposure to birds or related allergens.

== Epidemiology ==
The frequency of BFL is hard to determine. It may be between 0.5% and 7.5% of bird owners in the United Kingdom.

== See also ==
- Hypersensitivity pneumonitis
- Farmer's lung
