= Saccharopolyspora tripterygii =

Scientific classification
- Domain: Bacteria
- Kingdom: Bacillati
- Phylum: Actinomycetota
- Class: Actinomycetia
- Order: Pseudonocardiales
- Family: Pseudonocardiaceae
- Genus: Saccharopolyspora
- Species: S. tripterygii

Binomial name
- Saccharopolyspora tripterygii Li et al. 2009

Type strain
- CCTCC AA 208062, DSM 45269, YIM 65359

Species of bacterium

Saccharopolyspora tripterygii is a bacterium from the genus Saccharopolyspora which has been isolated from the stem of the plant Tripterygium hypoglaucum in Yunnan in China.
