= Saccharopolyspora gregorii =

Scientific classification
- Domain: Bacteria
- Kingdom: Bacillati
- Phylum: Actinomycetota
- Class: Actinomycetia
- Order: Pseudonocardiales
- Family: Pseudonocardiaceae
- Genus: Saccharopolyspora
- Species: S. gregorii

Binomial name
- Saccharopolyspora gregorii Goodfellow et al. 1989

Type strain
- A333, A85, AS 4.1361, ATCC 51265, CGMCC 4.1361, DSM 44324, FH 2482, IFO 15045, IMSNU 20122, JCM 9687, KCTC 9486, LaceyA333, NBRC 15045, NCIB 12823, NCIMB 12823, NRRL B-16506, NRRL B-16506

Species of bacterium

Saccharopolyspora gregorii is a bacterium from the genus Saccharopolyspora which has been isolated from fodder.
