= Saccharopolyspora kobensis =

Scientific classification
- Domain: Bacteria
- Kingdom: Bacillati
- Phylum: Actinomycetota
- Class: Actinomycetia
- Order: Pseudonocardiales
- Family: Pseudonocardiaceae
- Genus: Saccharopolyspora
- Species: S. kobensis

Binomial name
- Saccharopolyspora kobensis (Lacey 1989) Nouioui et al. 2018

Type strain
- ATCC 20501; DSM 44795; FERM P-3912; IFO 15151; KC 6606; NBRC 15151

Synonyms
- "Saccharopolyspora hirsuta subsp. kobensis" Iwasake and Mori 1979; Saccharopolyspora hirsuta subsp. kobensis (ex Iwasake and Mori 1979) Lacey 1989; Saccharopolyspora jiangxiensis Zhang et al. 2009

Species of bacterium

Saccharopolyspora kobensis is a bacterium from the genus Saccharopolyspora.
