= Saccharopolyspora hordei =

Scientific classification
- Domain: Bacteria
- Kingdom: Bacillati
- Phylum: Actinomycetota
- Class: Actinomycetes
- Order: Pseudonocardiales
- Family: Pseudonocardiaceae
- Genus: Saccharopolyspora
- Species: S. hordei

Binomial name
- Saccharopolyspora hordei Goodfellow et al. 1989

Type strain
- A54, A735, ATCC 49856, DSM 44065, IFO 15046, IMSNU 20124, JCM 8090, KACC 20068, KCTC 9485, LaceyA735, NBRC 15046, NCIB 12824, NCIMB 12824, NRRL B-16507, NRRL B-16507

Species of bacterium

Saccharopolyspora hordei is a bacterium from the genus Saccharopolyspora which has been isolated from hay.
