= Saccharopolyspora dendranthemae =

Scientific classification
- Domain: Bacteria
- Kingdom: Bacillati
- Phylum: Actinomycetota
- Class: Actinomycetia
- Order: Pseudonocardiales
- Family: Pseudonocardiaceae
- Genus: Saccharopolyspora
- Species: S. dendranthemae

Binomial name
- Saccharopolyspora dendranthemae Zhang et al. 2014

Type strain
- KCTC 19889, NBRC 108675, KLBMP 1305

Species of bacterium

Saccharopolyspora dendranthemae is a halotolerant bacterium from the genus Saccharopolyspora which has been isolated from the stem of the plant Dendranthema indicum in Nantong in China.
