= Spinetoram =

Chemical compound

Clinical data
- Trade names: Delegate, Cheristin
- ATCvet code: QP53AX31 (WHO)

Identifiers
- IUPAC name: (2R,5R,9R,10S,14R,15S,19S)-15-[(2R,5S,6R)-5-(dimethylamino)-6-methyloxan-2-yl]oxy-7-[(2R,3R,4R,5S,6S)-4-ethoxy-3,5-dimethoxy-6-methyloxan-2-yl]oxy-19-ethyl-14-methyl-20-oxatetracyclo[10.10.0.02,10.05,9]docos-11-ene-13,21-dione
- CAS Number: 935545-74-7
- PubChem CID: 53297414
- ChemSpider: 30791336
- UNII: YGZ1037ELN
- CompTox Dashboard (EPA): DTXSID3058614
- ECHA InfoCard: 100.211.310

Chemical and physical data
- Formula: C_{42}H_{69}NO_{10}
- Molar mass: 748.011 g·mol^{−1}
- 3D model (JSmol): Interactive image
- SMILES: CCC1CCCC(C(C(=O)C2=CC3C(C2CC(=O)O1)CCC4C3CC(C4)OC5C(C(C(C(O5)C)OC)OCC)OC)C)OC6CCC(C(O6)C)N(C)C
- InChI: InChI=InChI=1S/C42H69NO10/c1-10-27-13-12-14-35(53-37-18-17-34(43(6)7)24(4)49-37)23(3)38(45)33-21-31-29(32(33)22-36(44)51-27)16-15-26-19-28(20-30(26)31)52-42-41(47-9)40(48-11-2)39(46-8)25(5)50-42/h21,23-32,34-35,37,39-42H,10-20,22H2,1-9H3/t23-,24-,25+,26-,27+,28?,29-,30-,31-,32?,34+,35+,37+,39+,40-,41-,42+/m1/s1; Key:GOENIMGKWNZVDA-OAMCMWGQSA-N

Spinetoram (marketed as Cheristin in its topical veterinary dosage-form) is an insecticidal mixture of two active neurotoxic constituents of Saccharopolyspora spinosa. It is used to control pest insects in stored grain and on domestic cats.

== See also ==
- Spinosad
