= Saccharopolyspora rosea =

Scientific classification
- Domain: Bacteria
- Kingdom: Bacillati
- Phylum: Actinomycetota
- Class: Actinomycetia
- Order: Pseudonocardiales
- Family: Pseudonocardiaceae
- Genus: Saccharopolyspora
- Species: S. rosea

Binomial name
- Saccharopolyspora rosea Tang et al. 2009

Type strain
- CCUG 56401, DSM 45226, IMMIB L-1070

Species of bacterium

Saccharopolyspora rosea is a bacterium from the genus Saccharopolyspora, which has been isolated from bronchial lavage of a patient in Aachen in Germany.
