= Bagassosis =

- Specialty: Pulmonology

Bagassosis, an interstitial lung disease, is a type of hypersensitivity pneumonitis attributed to exposure to moldy molasses or bagasse dust.

== Signs and symptoms ==
Some symptoms and signs of bagassosis include breathlessness, cough, haemoptysis, and slight fever. Acute diffuse bronchiolitis may also occur. An X-ray may show mottling of lungs or a shadow.

== Cause ==
Bagassosis has been shown to be due to a thermophilic actinomycete for which the name Thermoactinomycetes sacchari was suggested.

== Prevention ==
The following are precautionary measures that can be taken to avoid the spread of bagassosis:

1. Dust control – prevention/suppression of dust such as wet process, enclosed apparatus, exhaust ventilation etc. should be used
2. Personal protection – masks/respirators
3. Medical control – initial medical examination and periodical checkups of workers
4. Bagasse control – keep moisture content above 20% and spray bagasse with 2% propionic acid

== History ==
Bagassosis was first reported in India by Ganguly and Pal in 1955, in a cardboard manufacturing plant near Kolkata. India has a large cane sugar industry. The sugarcane fibre which, until recently, went to waste, is now utilised in the manufacture of cardboard, paper and rayon. Bagasse is commonly used to fuel boilers in sugar mills across the world, particularly in Australian sugar mills.
