= Saccharopolyspora subtropica =

Scientific classification
- Domain: Bacteria
- Kingdom: Bacillati
- Phylum: Actinomycetota
- Class: Actinomycetia
- Order: Pseudonocardiales
- Family: Pseudonocardiaceae
- Genus: Saccharopolyspora
- Species: S. subtropica

Binomial name
- Saccharopolyspora subtropica Wu et al. 2016

Type strain
- CGMCC 4.7206, DSM 46801, T3, T3(2014)

Species of bacterium

Saccharopolyspora subtropica is a thermophilic bacterium from the genus Saccharopolyspora which has been isolated from a sugar cane field in Guangxi in China.
