= Saccharopolyspora taberi =

Scientific classification
- Domain: Bacteria
- Kingdom: Bacillati
- Phylum: Actinomycetota
- Class: Actinomycetia
- Order: Pseudonocardiales
- Family: Pseudonocardiaceae
- Genus: Saccharopolyspora
- Species: S. taberi

Binomial name
- Saccharopolyspora taberi (Labeda 1987) Korn-Wendisch et al. 1989

Type strain
- AS 4.1360, ATCC 49842, CGMCC 4.1360, CGMCC 4.2117, DSM 43856, IFO 15061, IMET 7648, IMSNU 20126, JCM 9383, KCTC 9482, LL-WRAT-210, LLR-WRAT-210, LLWRAT-210, NBRC 15061, NRRL B-16173, NRRL B-16173

Synonyms
- Saccharopolyspora hirsuta subsp. taberi Labeda 1987

Species of bacterium

Saccharopolyspora taberi is a bacterium from the genus Saccharopolyspora which has been isolated from soil in Texas in the United States.
