= Saccharopolyspora spongiae =

Scientific classification
- Domain: Bacteria
- Kingdom: Bacillati
- Phylum: Actinomycetota
- Class: Actinomycetia
- Order: Pseudonocardiales
- Family: Pseudonocardiaceae
- Genus: Saccharopolyspora
- Species: S. spongiae

Binomial name
- Saccharopolyspora spongiae Souza et al. 2017

Type strain
- DSM 103218, NRRL B-65384, CMAA 1452

Species of bacterium

Saccharopolyspora spongiae is a bacterium from the genus Saccharopolyspora which has been isolated from the sponge Scopalina ruetzleri.
