= Stasina nalandica =

Scientific classification
- Kingdom: Animalia
- Phylum: Arthropoda
- Subphylum: Chelicerata
- Class: Arachnida
- Order: Araneae
- Infraorder: Araneomorphae
- Family: Sparassidae
- Genus: Stasina
- Species: S. nalandica

Binomial name
- Stasina nalandica Karsch, 1892

Species of spider

Stasina nalandica, is a species of spider of the genus Stasina. It is endemic to Sri Lanka.
