= Saccharopolyspora cavernae =

Scientific classification
- Domain: Bacteria
- Kingdom: Bacillati
- Phylum: Actinomycetota
- Class: Actinomycetia
- Order: Pseudonocardiales
- Family: Pseudonocardiaceae
- Genus: Saccharopolyspora
- Species: S. cavernae

Binomial name
- Saccharopolyspora cavernae Cheng et al. 2014

Type strain
- CCTCC AA 2012022, DSM 45825, YIM C01235

Species of bacterium

Saccharopolyspora cavernae is a Gram-positive, aerobic and non-motile bacterium from the genus of Saccharopolyspora which has been isolated from cave-wall soil from the Swallow Cave, Yunnan Province, China.
