= Saccharopolyspora cebuensis =

Scientific classification
- Domain: Bacteria
- Kingdom: Bacillati
- Phylum: Actinomycetota
- Class: Actinomycetia
- Order: Pseudonocardiales
- Family: Pseudonocardiaceae
- Genus: Saccharopolyspora
- Species: S. cebuensis

Binomial name
- Saccharopolyspora cebuensis Pimentel-Elardo et al. 2008

Type strain
- CIP 109355, DSM 45019, JCM 18116, SPE 10-1

Species of bacterium

Saccharopolyspora cebuensis is a bacterium from the genus Saccharopolyspora which has been isolated from the marine sponge Haliclona on Cebu in the Philippines.
