= Saccharopolyspora halophila =

Scientific classification
- Domain: Bacteria
- Kingdom: Bacillati
- Phylum: Actinomycetota
- Class: Actinomycetia
- Order: Pseudonocardiales
- Family: Pseudonocardiaceae
- Genus: Saccharopolyspora
- Species: S. halophila

Binomial name
- Saccharopolyspora halophila Tang et al. 2009

Type strain
- DSM 45007, JCM 16221, KCTC 19162, YIM 90500

Species of bacterium

Saccharopolyspora halophila is a halophilic bacterium from the genus Saccharopolyspora which has been isolated from a salt lake from Xinjiang in China.
