= Saccharopolyspora indica =

Scientific classification
- Domain: Bacteria
- Kingdom: Bacillati
- Phylum: Actinomycetota
- Class: Actinomycetia
- Order: Pseudonocardiales
- Family: Pseudonocardiaceae
- Genus: Saccharopolyspora
- Species: S. indica

Binomial name
- Saccharopolyspora indica Vaddavalli et al. 2014

Type strain
- ATCC BAA-2551, KCTC 29208, MCC 2206, MTCC 11564, VRC122

Species of bacterium

Saccharopolyspora indica is a bacterium from the genus of Saccharopolyspora which has been isolated from the rhizosphere of the plant Callistemon citrinus from New Delhi in India.
