= Saccharopolyspora deserti =

Scientific classification
- Domain: Bacteria
- Kingdom: Bacillati
- Phylum: Actinomycetota
- Class: Actinomycetia
- Order: Pseudonocardiales
- Family: Pseudonocardiaceae
- Genus: Saccharopolyspora
- Species: S. deserti

Binomial name
- Saccharopolyspora deserti Yang et al. 2018

Type strain
- CPCC 204620, KCTC 39989, SYSU D8010

Species of bacterium

Saccharopolyspora deserti is a halotolerant bacterium from the genus of Saccharopolyspora which has been isolated from sand in Saudi Arabia.
