= Saccharopolyspora gloriosae =

Scientific classification
- Domain: Bacteria
- Kingdom: Bacillati
- Phylum: Actinomycetota
- Class: Actinomycetia
- Order: Pseudonocardiales
- Family: Pseudonocardiaceae
- Genus: Saccharopolyspora
- Species: S. gloriosae

Binomial name
- Saccharopolyspora gloriosae Qin et al. 2010

Type strain
- CCTCC AA 207006, KCTC 19243, AECSS08, YIM 60513

Species of bacterium

Saccharopolyspora gloriosae is a bacterium from the genus Saccharopolyspora which has been isolated from the stem of the plant Gloriosa superba from the tropical rainforest in Xishuangbanna in China.
