= Saccharopolyspora antimicrobica =

Scientific classification
- Domain: Bacteria
- Kingdom: Bacillati
- Phylum: Actinomycetota
- Class: Actinomycetia
- Order: Pseudonocardiales
- Family: Pseudonocardiaceae
- Genus: Saccharopolyspora
- Species: S. antimicrobica

Binomial name
- Saccharopolyspora antimicrobica Yuan et al. 2008

Type strain
- CCM 7463, JCM 16610, KCTC 19303, I05-00074

Species of bacterium

Saccharopolyspora antimicrobia is a Gram-positive, aerobic and non-motile bacterium from the genus of Saccharopolyspora which has been isolated from soil in Beijing and Sichuan in China.
