= Saccharopolyspora rectivirgula =

Scientific classification
- Domain: Bacteria
- Kingdom: Bacillati
- Phylum: Actinomycetota
- Class: Actinomycetes
- Order: Pseudonocardiales
- Family: Pseudonocardiaceae
- Genus: Saccharopolyspora
- Species: S. rectivirgula

Binomial name
- Saccharopolyspora rectivirgula (Krassilnikov and Agre 1964) Korn-Wendisch et al. 1989

Synonyms
- Faenia rectivirgula (Krasil'nikov and Agre 1964) Kurup and Agre 1983; Micropolyspora faeni Cross et al. 1968 (Approved Lists 1980); Micropolyspora rectivirgula (Krassilnikov and Agre 1964) Prauser and Momirova 1970 (Approved Lists 1980); Thermopolyspora polyspora Henssen 1957; "Thermopolyspora rectivirgula" Krasil'nikov and Agre 1964

Species of bacterium

Saccharopolyspora rectivirgula is a species of bacteria. It is a Gram-positive, spore-forming, obligately aerobic, thermophilic rod. It was formerly known as Micropolyspora faeni.

Inhalation of the bacteria can cause extrinsic allergic alveolitis, also known as farmer's lung, a type of hypersensitivity pneumonitis. S. rectivirgula is typically isolated from moldy hay, soil, compost, and manure, and thus handling of hay bales and compost increases exposure to the bacteria and increases the risk of developing the disease.

The species name, rectivirgula, comes from Latin, meaning "straight twig".

== Microbiology ==
S. rectivirgula is often classified with the aerobic actinomycetes, an informal, taxonomically divergent destination for which no agreed-upon operational definition currently exists, beyond that members of this group often form gram-positive rods at some point in their growth, and most of which have rudimentary branching under certain growth conditions.

S. rectivirgula colonies have been described as being beige or yellow, thin, raised/convex, slightly wrinkled, and mucoid/gelatinous with sparse aerial mycelium. Their aerial hyphae are typically white to light pink in color and are between 0.8 and 1.2μm in diameter. Their substrate mycelium is yellow to orange, branched, septate, and 0.5 to 0.8μm in diameter. Their spores are developed in chains on both substrate and aerial hyphae on short, unbranched, lateral or terminal sporophores. It has the cell wall type IV, containing meso-DAP, arabinose, and galactose, as well as phospholipid type III.

The organism grows in temperatures between 37 and 63 °C, with optimum growth at 45–50 °C, and grows in NaCl concentrations up to 10%. S. rectivigula grows on a wide variety of media, including yeast malt agar and tryptone soy agar.

It is non-acid fast, spore-forming, non-hemolytic, and is lysozyme sensitive. Additionally, it hydrolyzes esculin, arbutin, urea, allantoin, and uric acid, and degrades xanthine, hypoxanthine, tyrosine, gelatin, and casein. Adenine, elastin, starch, chitin, and xylan are not degraded, and glucose, xylose, fructose, sucrose, raffinose, mannitol, and inositol are utilized by this bacterium as sole carbon sources.

== Medical relevance ==
Saccharopolyspora rectivirgula is best known as being an etiological agent of farmer's lung.

Farmer's lung is one of the two most common forms of extrinsic allergic alveolitis, the other being pigeon breeder's disease. The symptoms result from sensitization and repeated inhalation of an antigen, and immunopathogenesis appears to involve both type III antigen-antibody complex and type IV cell-mediated delayed hypersensitivity responses to the offending antigen. Symptoms can vary depending on whether the disease is acute, subacute or chronic, but are nonspecific and can include acute cough, dyspnea, fever, malaise and anorexia.

Diagnosis of hypersensitivity pneumonitis can rely on either the demonstration in the patient's serum of precipitating antibodies to the causal antigen, a positive laboratory culture/PCR result for the offending pathogen or chest radiographs of pulmonary infiltrates compatible with hypersensitivity pneumonitis. A majority of patients with acute farmer's lung demonstrate precipitating serum antibodies in double-gel diffusion tests to an antigenic extract of S. rectivirgula.

Treatment usually involves avoidance of re-exposure to the causative antigens, as well as corticosteroids to improve pathologic lesions and inflammation.
