= Saccharopolyspora halotolerans =

Scientific classification
- Domain: Bacteria
- Kingdom: Bacillati
- Phylum: Actinomycetota
- Class: Actinomycetia
- Order: Pseudonocardiales
- Family: Pseudonocardiaceae
- Genus: Saccharopolyspora
- Species: S. halotolerans

Binomial name
- Saccharopolyspora halotolerans Lv et al. 2014

Type strain
- CCTCC AA 2013006, DSM 45990, TRM 45123

Species of bacterium

Saccharopolyspora halotolerans is a halophilic bacterium from the genus Saccharopolyspora which has been isolated from soil from the salt lake Lop Nur in Xinjiang in China.
