= Saccharopolyspora spinosporotrichia =

Scientific classification
- Domain: Bacteria
- Kingdom: Bacillati
- Phylum: Actinomycetota
- Class: Actinomycetia
- Order: Pseudonocardiales
- Family: Pseudonocardiaceae
- Genus: Saccharopolyspora
- Species: S. spinosporotrichia

Binomial name
- Saccharopolyspora spinosporotrichia Zhou et al. 1998

Type strain
- A-50, AS4.198, DSM 44350, IFO 16190, JCM 10303, KCTC 9939, NBRC 16190

Species of bacterium

Saccharopolyspora spinosporotrichia is a Gram-positive and aerobic bacterium from the genus Saccharopolyspora which has been isolated from soil in Jiangxi in China.
