= Saccharopolyspora thermophila =

Scientific classification
- Domain: Bacteria
- Kingdom: Bacillati
- Phylum: Actinomycetota
- Class: Actinomycetes
- Order: Pseudonocardiales
- Family: Pseudonocardiaceae
- Genus: Saccharopolyspora
- Species: S. thermophila

Binomial name
- Saccharopolyspora thermophila Lu et al. 2001

Type strain
- 216, AS 4.1511, CGMCC 4.1511, DSM 44575, IFO 16346, JCM 10664, KCTC 19903, NBRC 16346

Species of bacterium

Saccharopolyspora thermophila is a Gram-positive and aerobic bacterium from the genus Saccharopolyspora which has been isolated from soil in China, South America, and India.
