= Saccharopolyspora qijiaojingensis =

Scientific classification
- Domain: Bacteria
- Kingdom: Bacillati
- Phylum: Actinomycetota
- Class: Actinomycetia
- Order: Pseudonocardiales
- Family: Pseudonocardiaceae
- Genus: Saccharopolyspora
- Species: S. qijiaojingensis

Binomial name
- Saccharopolyspora qijiaojingensis Tang et al. 2009

Type strain
- DSM 45088, KCTC 19235, YIM 91168

Species of bacterium

Saccharopolyspora qijiaojingensis is a halophilic bacterium from the genus Saccharopolyspora which has been isolated from a salt lake in Xinjiang in China.
