= Saccharopolyspora flava =

Scientific classification
- Domain: Bacteria
- Kingdom: Bacillati
- Phylum: Actinomycetota
- Class: Actinomycetia
- Order: Pseudonocardiales
- Family: Pseudonocardiaceae
- Genus: Saccharopolyspora
- Species: S. flava

Binomial name
- Saccharopolyspora flava Lu et al. 2001

Type strain
- AS 4.1520, DSM 44771, IFO 16345, JCM 10665, NBRC 16345, 07

Species of bacterium

Saccharopolyspora flava is a Gram-positive and aerobic bacterium from the genus Saccharopolyspora which has been isolated from garden soil in China.
