= Saccharopolyspora hattusasensis =

Scientific classification
- Domain: Bacteria
- Kingdom: Bacillati
- Phylum: Actinomycetota
- Class: Actinomycetes
- Order: Pseudonocardiales
- Family: Pseudonocardiaceae
- Genus: Saccharopolyspora
- Species: S. hattusasensis

Binomial name
- Saccharopolyspora hattusasensis Veyisoglu et al. 2018

Type strain
- DSM 45715, KCTC 29104, CR3506

Species of bacterium

Saccharopolyspora hattusasensis is a bacterium from the genus Saccharopolyspora which has been isolated from soil from Sungurlu in Turkey.
