= Lycoperdonosis =

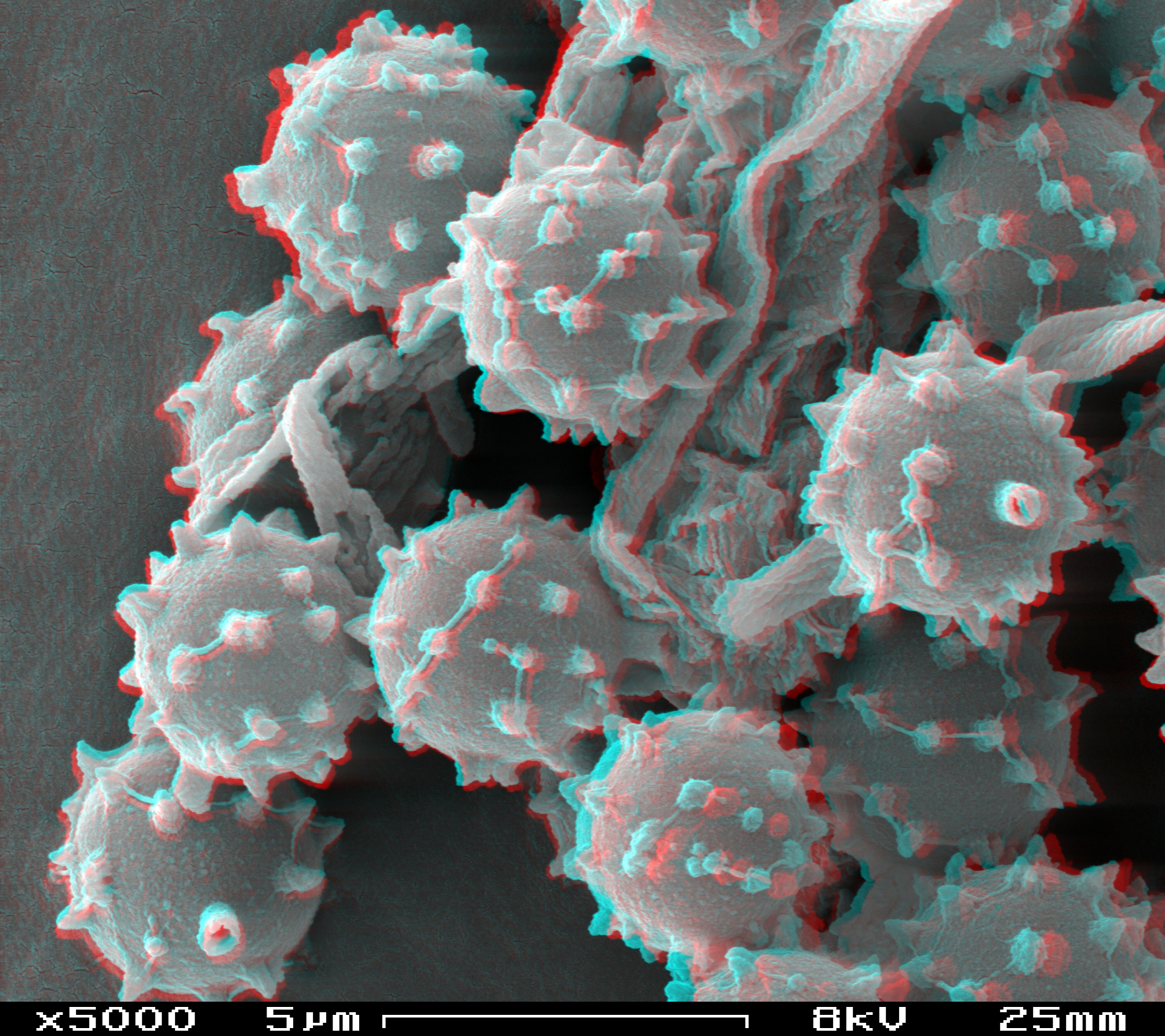
- Puffball spores seen with scanning electron microscopy; 5000x magnification
- Specialty: Pulmonology

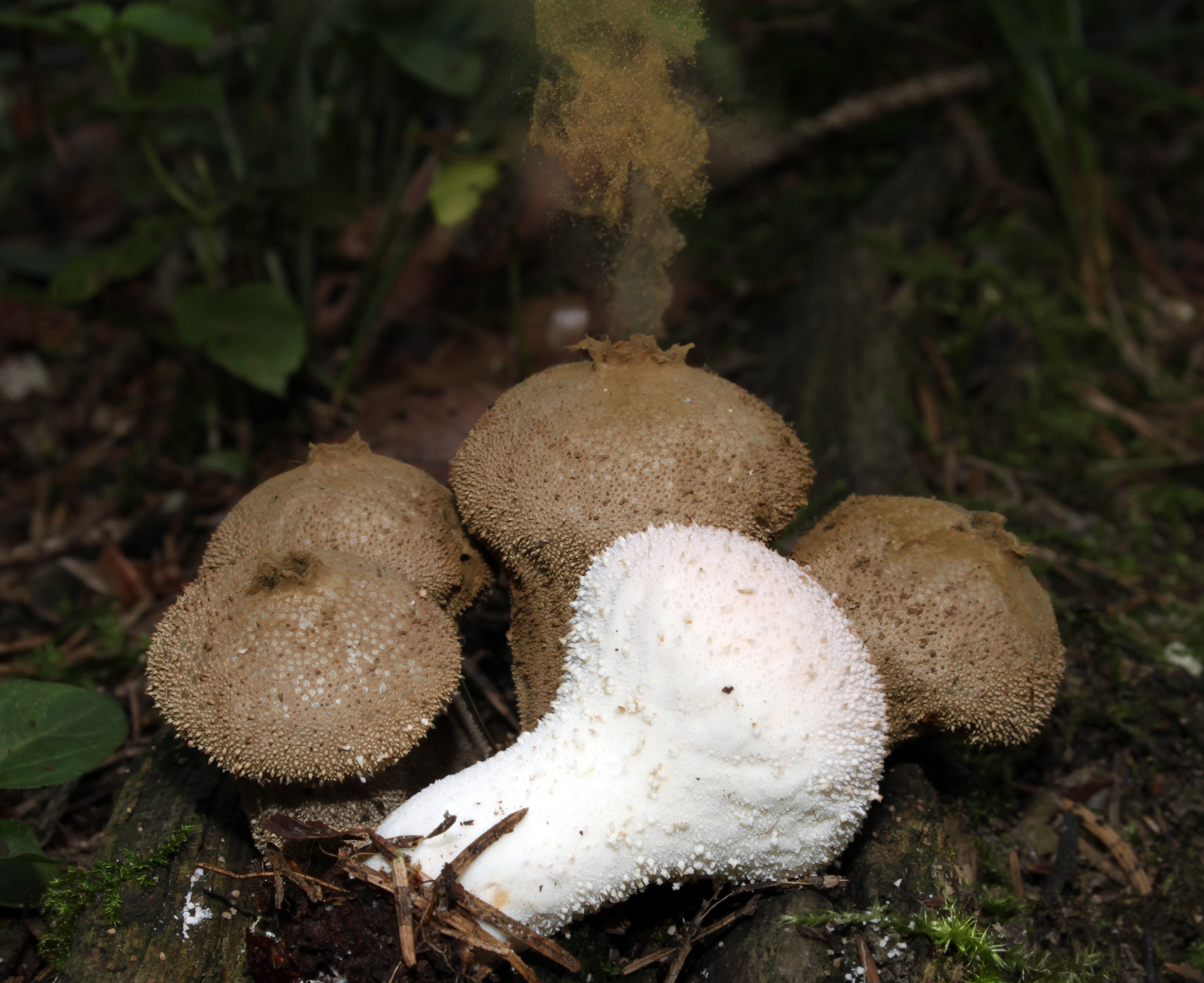
Puffball species like Lycoperdon perlatum produce copious amounts of spores when they are mature.

Lycoperdonosis is a respiratory disease caused by the inhalation of large amounts of spores from mature puffballs. It is classified as a hypersensitivity pneumonitis (also called extrinsic allergic alveolitis)—an inflammation of the alveoli within the lung caused by hypersensitivity to inhaled natural dusts. It is one of several types of hypersensitivity pneumonitis caused by different agents that have similar clinical features. Typical progression of the disease includes symptoms of a cold hours after spore inhalation, followed by nausea, rapid pulse, crepitant rales (a sound like that made by rubbing hairs between the fingers, heard at the end of inhalation), and dyspnea. Chest radiographs reveal the presence of lung nodules. The early symptoms presented in combination with pulmonary abnormalities apparent on chest radiographs may lead to misdiagnosis of the disease as tuberculosis, histiocytosis, or pneumonia caused by Pneumocystis carinii. Lycoperdonosis is generally treated with corticosteroids, which decrease the inflammatory response; these are sometimes given in conjunction with antimicrobials.

The disease was first described in the medical literature in 1967 by R.D. Strand and colleagues in the New England Journal of Medicine. In 1976, a 4-year-old was reported developing the disease in Norway after purposely inhaling a large quantity of Lycoperdon spores to stop a nosebleed. Lycoperdon species are sometimes used in folk medicine in the belief that their spores have haemostatic properties. A 1997 case report discussed several instances of teenagers inhaling the spores. In one severe case, the individual inhaled enough spores so as to be able to blow them out of his mouth. He underwent bronchoscopy and then had to be on life support before recovering in about four weeks. In another instance, a teenager spent 18 days in a coma, had portions of his lung removed, and suffered severe liver damage. In Wisconsin, eight teenagers who inhaled spores at a party presented clinical symptoms such as cough, fever, shortness of breath, myalgia, and fatigue within a week. Five of the eight required hospitalization; of these, two required intubation to assist in breathing. The disease is rare, possibly because of the large quantity of spores that need to be inhaled for clinical effects to occur. Lycoperdonosis also occurs in dogs; in the few reported cases, the animals had been playing or digging in areas known to contain puffballs. Known species of puffballs implicated in the etiology of the published cases include the widespread Lycoperdon perlatum (the "devil's snuff-box", L. gemmatum) and Calvatia gigantea, both of the family Lycoperdaceae.
