= Saccharopolyspora hirsuta =

Scientific classification
- Domain: Bacteria
- Kingdom: Bacillati
- Phylum: Actinomycetota
- Class: Actinomycetes
- Order: Pseudonocardiales
- Family: Pseudonocardiaceae
- Genus: Saccharopolyspora
- Species: S. hirsuta

Binomial name
- Saccharopolyspora hirsuta Lacey and Goodfellow 1975 (Approved Lists 1980)

Species of bacterium

Saccharopolyspora hirsuta is a nocardioform actinomycete.
