= Organic dust toxic syndrome =

- Specialty: Pulmonology

Organic dust toxic syndrome is a potentially severe flu-like syndrome originally described in farmers, mushroom workers, bird breeders and other persons occupationally exposed to dusty conditions.

== Symptoms ==
Symptoms arise 4 to 12 hours after exposure to an organic dust, and generally last from one to five days. Common generalised symptoms include fever over 38 °C / 100.4 °F, chills, myalgia and malaise. The most frequent respiratory symptoms are dyspnea and a dry cough, while a wheeze may be present less commonly. Headache, rhinitis, conjunctivitis and keratitis can also be present, and skin irritation may occur in those handling grain.

Respiratory function may worsen to the point where hypoxia occurs, and damage to the airways may lead to non-cardiogenic pulmonary edema one to three days post exposure.

Laboratory investigations may show a raised white cell (and specifically neutrophil) count, while a chest X-ray is often normal or shows minimal interstitial infiltration.

== Causes ==
An inflammatory reaction of the airways and alveoli, the mechanism of organic dust toxic syndrome is thought to be toxic rather than autoimmune in origin. The airways are exposed to high concentrations of organic dust created by some form of disturbance or mechanical process. They can be such materials such as grain kernel fragments, bits of insects, bacteria, fungal spores, molds or chemical residues, the individual particles 0.1 to 50 μm in size. A common scenario is exposure to moldy grain, hay or woodchips, with farmers and pig workers the most common occupations affected. Those who work with grain, poultry and mushrooms also frequently report symptoms.

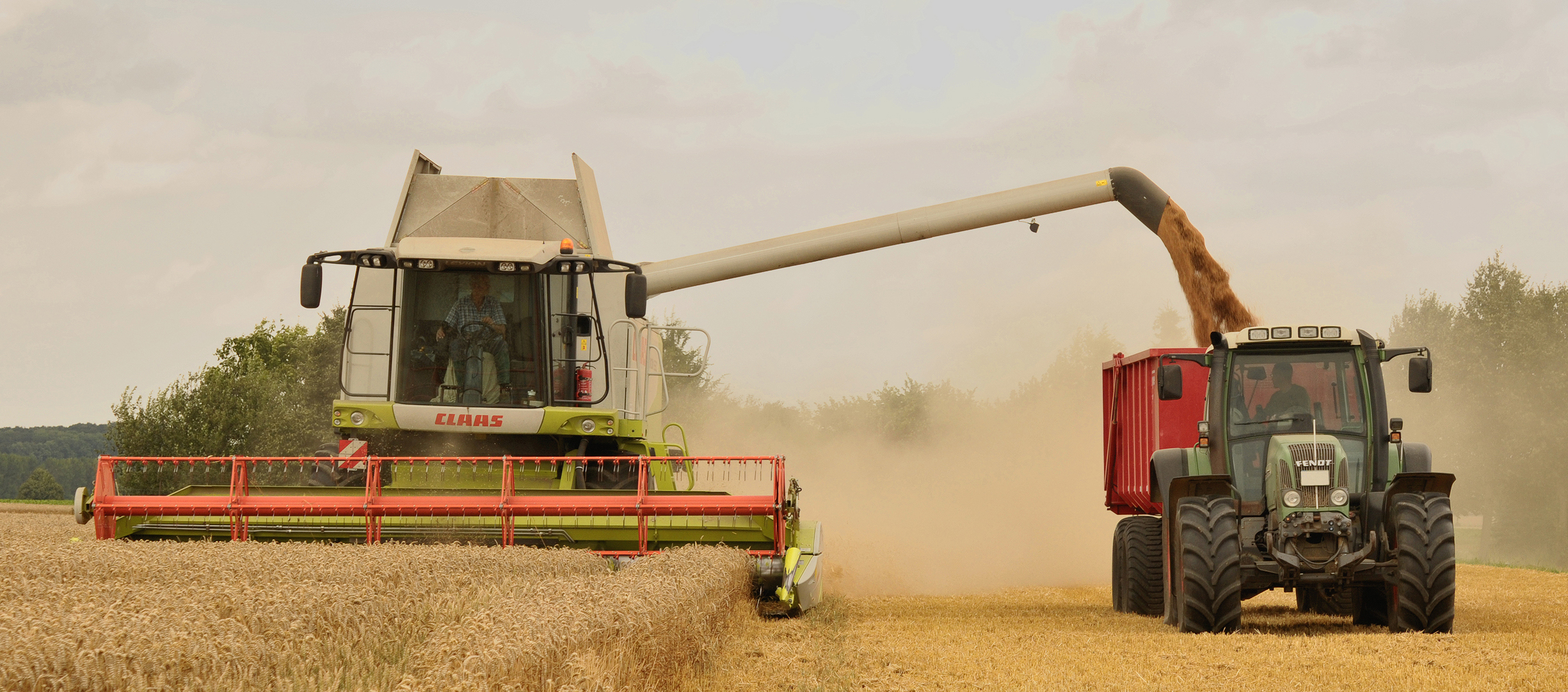
Wheat harvested has dust blown in the air.

Pulmonary reactions occur due to the exposure to grain dust. The amount of organic dust include hay, grain, wood and compost. Exposure to high amounts of dust particles cause syndromes of grain fever, organic dust toxic syndrome, toxic pneumonitis, inhalation fever, silo unloaders' disease, hypersensitivity pneumonitis, farmers' lung, mushroom workers' lung, and bark strippers' disease. Recent studies have conducted that organic dust syndrome has acute like symptoms of grain fever, silo unloaders' disease and toxic pneumonitis.

== Diagnosis ==
Diagnosis is first done through the inspection of the swollen mucosa in the mouth and visible airways. Any inspection of the lung stays nonetheless unapparent.

== Treatment ==
The illness is generally self-limiting. Management on the whole is preventive, by limiting exposure to mouldy environments with ventilation, or by wearing respiratory protection such as facemasks.

== History ==
It was recognised as a distinct clinical syndrome in the 1980s. Previously, cases had been reported and given various names such as pulmonary mycotoxicosis, silo unloader's syndrome, grain fever, malt fever, toxin fever, humidifier fever, mill fever, toxic alveolitis or allergic alveolitis. In 1994, the National Institute for Occupational Safety and Health published case reports and highlighted the urgency for study of the syndrome.

There are two primary types of dust exposure in agriculture: inorganic and organic. Often the cause of allergy illnesses like asthma, organic dusts come from both plant and animal sources. Inorganic dust illnesses are non-allergic lung reactions that originate in the soil. Asthma-like symptoms are linked to inorganic dust syndrome.

== External Factors ==
=== Droughts ===
In the Sierra Nevada, where the dust cycle has responded significantly to climate change, droughts have been a competing element. The primary factors are the increased greenhouse gas emissions that have contributed to global warming, which has had a significant impact on moisture levels and the possibility of evapotranspiration (the amount of water that evaporates from the ground to the amount of water that is accessible). Crop water intake is also calculated using potential evapotranspiration. Dust emissions have increased as a result of land use, industrial development, and animal grazing, particularly in the western United States. Furthermore,"Dust emissions in some regions have increased by up to 400% in the past several decades".

=== Inorganic dust (minerals) ===
The Central Valley of California is known for its agricultural industry, including dry farming, resulting in increase of airborne dust from field procedures (harvesting, crop cleanup, etc.). Soil is a combination of small amounts of organic compound and large amounts of inorganic compounds, yet it is part of external factors that often cause nonallergic lung symptoms. Exposure to mineral dust presents the hazards for farmers in the development of lung disease. In one analysis, 112 male Hispanic individuals in the Fresno county were part of a study conducted in the findings of the comparison between farm workers and non-farm workers. Out of 32 individuals, 22 farmers were diagnosed with mineral dust small airways disease, Thirty-one out of Sixty-one were diagnosed with smoking-related small airways disease and 17 out 23 farmers were diagnosed with Pneumoconiosis. Furthermore, residents were as well found to be diagnosed with interstitial fibrosis, lymph node fibrosis, chronic bronchitis, asthma-like airway disease and emphysema. The study resulted in farmworkers having a higher risk of the diseases is mentioned.

== See also ==
- Farmer's lung
