= Saccharopolyspora shandongensis =

Scientific classification
- Domain: Bacteria
- Kingdom: Bacillati
- Phylum: Actinomycetota
- Class: Actinomycetia
- Order: Pseudonocardiales
- Family: Pseudonocardiaceae
- Genus: Saccharopolyspora
- Species: S. shandongensis

Binomial name
- Saccharopolyspora shandongensis Zhang et al. 2008

Type strain
- CGMCC 4.3530, JCM 14614, 88

Species of bacterium

Saccharopolyspora shandongensis is a bacterium from the genus Saccharopolyspora which has been isolated from wheat field soil in Shandong in China.
