= Penicillium alicantinum =

Scientific classification
- Kingdom: Fungi
- Division: Ascomycota
- Class: Eurotiomycetes
- Order: Eurotiales
- Family: Aspergillaceae
- Genus: Penicillium
- Species: P. alicantinum

Binomial name
- Penicillium alicantinum C. Ramírez & A.T. Martínez 1980

Type strain
- ATCC 42236, CBS 164.81, IJFM 7026, IMI 253797, KCTC 6393 VKM F-2193

Synonyms
- Penicillium albocinerascens, Penicillium citreonigrum, Penicillium citreoviride, Penicillium cinerascens, Penicillium gallaicum, Penicillium katangense, Penicillium lilacinoechinulatum, Penicillium syriacum, Penicillium subcinereum,

Species of fungus

Penicillium alicantinum is a fungus species of the genus of Penicillium which was isolated from the atmosphere in Madrid.

== See also ==
- List of Penicillium species
