= Farmer's lung =

Hypersensitivity pneumonitis

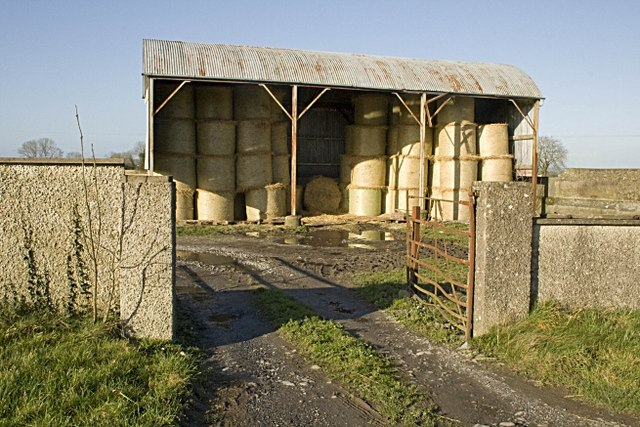
- Hay shed
- Specialty: Respirology

Farmer's lung is a type of hypersensitivity pneumonitis (also referred to as hypersensitivity alveolitis or extrinsic allergic alveolitis) which is induced by the inhalation of biologic dusts coming from hay dust or mold spores, or any other agricultural products. It results in a type III hypersensitivity inflammatory response and can progress to become a chronic condition which is considered potentially dangerous. It is not to be confused with silo-filler's disease.

== Signs and symptoms ==
- Acute Stage: Appears four to eight hours after exposure. Symptoms such as headache, irritating cough, and shortness of breath upon physical exertion.
- Subacute Stage: Symptoms persist without further exposure, and increase in severity. Symptoms include: shortness of breath upon exertion, chronic coughing, physical weakness, occasional fever and sweating, decrease in appetite, aches and pains.
- Chronic Stage: Debilitating effects are now considered long-term. Symptoms include: severe shortness of breath, chronic coughing, physical weakness, occasional fever and sweating at night, decrease in appetite, and general aches and pains.

These symptoms develop between four and eight hours after exposure to the antigens. In acute attacks, the symptoms mimic pneumonia or flu. In chronic attacks, there is a possibility of the victim going into shock and dying from the attack.

== Causes ==
Permanent lung damage can arise due to one's inability to recognize the cause of symptoms. Farmer's lung occurs because repeated exposure to antigens, found in the mold spores of hay, crops, and animal feed, triggers an allergic reaction within the farmer's immune system. The defense mechanisms of the body present as cold and flu-like symptoms that occur in individuals who experience either acute or chronic reactions.

The mold spores are inhaled and provoke the creation of IgE antibodies that circulate in the bloodstream, these types of immune response are most often initiated by exposure to thermophilic actinomycetes (most commonly Saccharopolyspora rectivirgula), which generate IgG-type antibodies. Following a subsequent exposure, IgG antibodies combined with the inhaled allergen to form immune complexes in the walls of the alveoli in the lungs. This causes fluid, protein, and cells to accumulate in the alveolar wall which slows blood-gas interchange and compromises the function of the lung. After multiple exposures, it takes less and less of the antigens to set off the reaction in the lung.

== Prevention ==
Farmer's lung disease (FLD) is permanent and cannot be reversed, therefore in order to prevent the onset of further stages, farmers should inform their doctor of their occupation and if they have mold in their work environment. Prevention of this respiratory illness can be facilitated through the ventilation of work areas, drying of materials, and the use of a mask when working in confined areas with moldy hay or crops.

== Diagnosis ==
Diagnoses of Farmer's lung is difficult due to its similarity to cold and flu-like symptoms. Doctors diagnose patients with Farmer's lung under the following conditions:

- A clinical history of symptoms such as cough, fever, and labored breathing when exposed to mold in work environment.
- The presence of diffuse lung disease in chronic cases.
- Presentation of antibodies when exposed to thermophilic Actinomyces.

Examination procedures may include:

- Taking a blood test
- Taking a chest x-ray
- Administering a breathing capacity test
- Administering an inhalation challenge
- Examining lung tissue
- Performing an immunological investigation
- Performing a lung function test
- Reviewing the clinical history

== Treatment ==
Depending on the severity of the symptoms, FLD can last from one to two weeks, or it can last for the rest of one's life. Acute FLD has the ability to be treated because hypersensitivity to the antigens has not yet developed. The main treatment options are: rest and reducing the exposure to the antigens through masks and increased airflow in confined spaces where the antigens are present. Any exposure to the antigens once hypersensitivity has occurred can set off another chronic reaction. For chronic FLD, there are no true treatments because the patient has developed hypersensitivity meaning that their condition will last the rest of their life.

== Epidemiology ==
The growth of mold spores occurs when hay is not dried properly. The growth of these mold spores accumulates over time and will infect the host upon release from the source. When in the air, the farmer may inhale the particles and induce an allergic reaction. The hay at risk for increased volumes of spores is found at the bottom of the pile. The incidence of Farmer's Lung Disease peaks during late winter and early spring, and is mostly seen after the harvest season when symptoms have set in. This disease is most prevalent in damp climates.

== See also ==
- Organic dust toxic syndrome
