= Stasina =

Scientific classification
- Kingdom: Animalia
- Phylum: Arthropoda
- Subphylum: Chelicerata
- Class: Arachnida
- Order: Araneae
- Infraorder: Araneomorphae
- Family: Sparassidae
- Genus: Stasina; Simon, 1877

Type species
- S. vittata Simon, 1877

Species
- 9, see text

Genus of spiders

Stasina is a genus of huntsman spiders that was first described by Eugène Louis Simon in 1877. Many former species have been transferred to Thelcticopis and Neostasina.

== Species ==
As of September 2019 it contains nine species, found in Asia, Venezuela, Brazil, Gabon, and on the Greater Antilles:

- Stasina americana Simon, 1887 – Brazil
- Stasina hirticeps Caporiacco, 1955 – Venezuela
- Stasina manicata Simon, 1897 – Gabon
- Stasina nalandica Karsch, 1892 – Sri Lanka
- Stasina paripes (Karsch, 1879) – Sri Lanka
- Stasina planithorax Simon, 1897 – Malaysia
- Stasina rangelensis Franganillo, 1935 – Cuba
- Stasina spinosa Simon, 1897 – Brazil
- Stasina vittata Simon, 1877 (type) – Philippines
