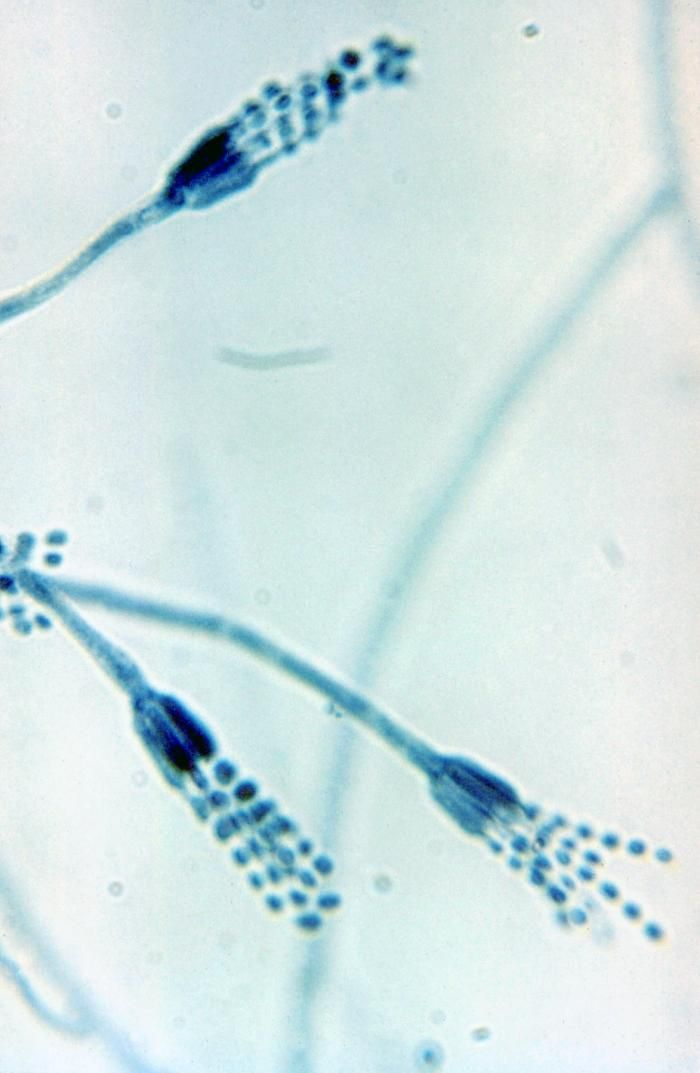
- P. glabrum conidiophores

Scientific classification
- Domain: Eukaryota
- Kingdom: Fungi
- Division: Ascomycota
- Class: Eurotiomycetes
- Order: Eurotiales
- Family: Aspergillaceae
- Genus: Penicillium
- Species: P. glabrum

Binomial name
- Penicillium glabrum (Wehmer) Westling, (1911)

Synonyms
- Penicillium frequentans; Penicillium terlikowskii

= Penicillium glabrum =

Species of fungus

Penicillium glabrum is a plant pathogen infecting strawberries.
