= Saccharopolyspora =

Scientific classification
- Domain: Bacteria
- Kingdom: Bacillati
- Phylum: Actinomycetota
- Class: Actinomycetes
- Order: Pseudonocardiales
- Family: Pseudonocardiaceae
- Genus: Saccharopolyspora; Lacey and Goodfellow 1975 (Approved Lists 1980)

Type species
- Saccharopolyspora hirsuta Lacey & Goodfellow 1975

Species
- See text

Synonyms
- Faenia Kurup and Agre 1983

Genus of bacteria

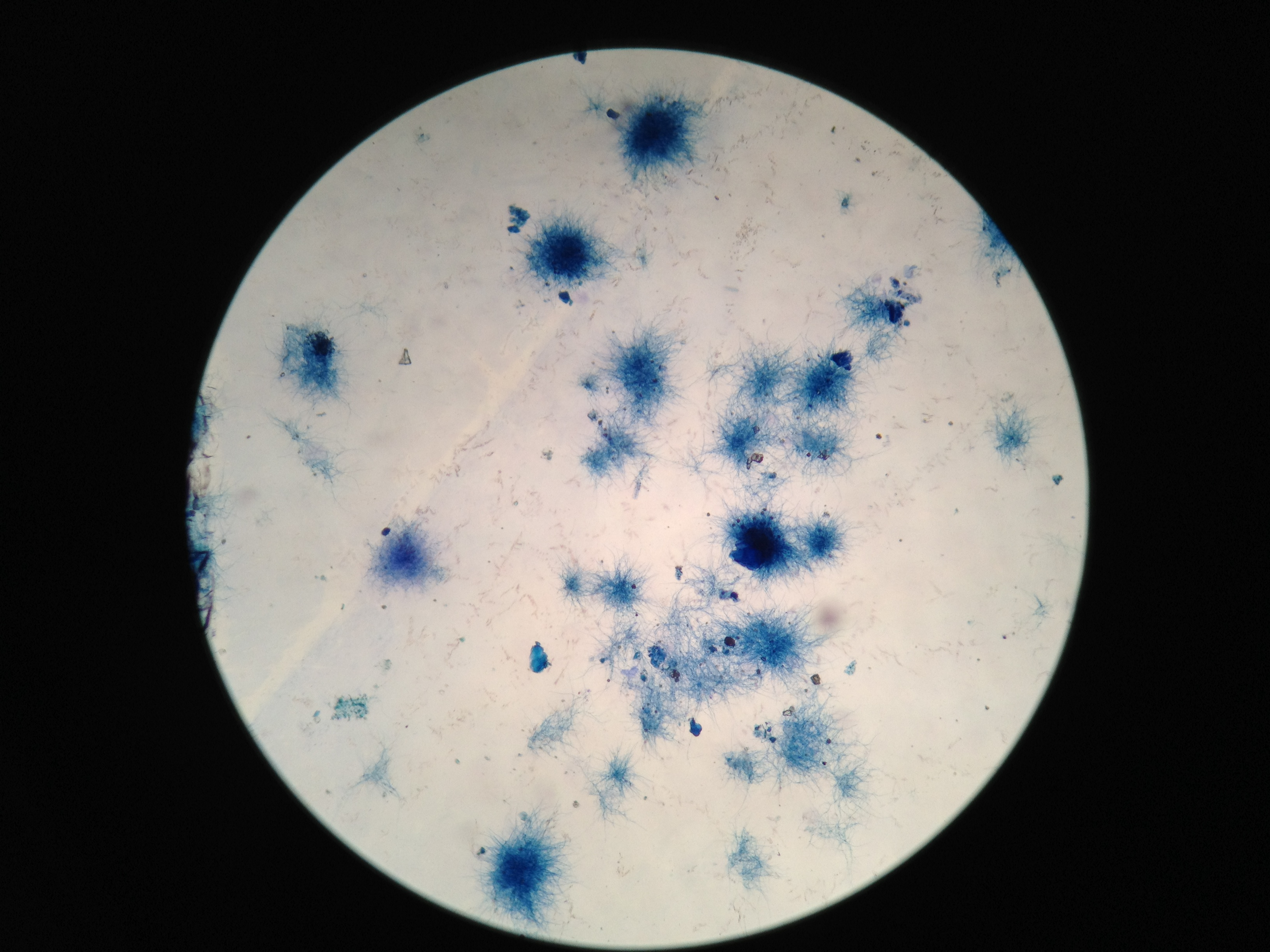
Dyed saccharopolyspora erythraea bacteria

Saccharopolyspora is a genus of bacteria within the family Pseudonocardiaceae.

== Phylogeny ==
The currently accepted taxonomy is based on the List of Prokaryotic names with Standing in Nomenclature (LPSN) and National Center for Biotechnology Information (NCBI).

16S rRNA based LTP_10_2024

- Saccharopolyspora
  - - S. taberi (Labeda 1987) Korn-Wendisch et al. 1989
    - - S. erythraea (Waksman 1923) Labeda 1987
      - S. spinosporotrichia Zhou et al. 1998
  - - - S. halotolerans Lv et al. 2014
      - - S. gloriosae Qin et al. 2010
        - S. gregorii Goodfellow et al. 1989
    - - S. cebuensis Pimentel-Elardo et al. 2008
      - - - - S. deserti Yang et al. 2018
            - S. halophila Tang et al. 2009
          - - - S. tripterygii Li et al. 2009
              - - S. flava Lu et al. 2001
                - S. rhizosphaerae Intra et al. 2019
            - - S. dendranthemae Zhang et al. 2014
              - - S. terrae Saygin et al. 2022
                - - S. karakumensis Saygin et al. 2022
                  - - S. spongiae Souza et al. 2017
                    - - S. aridisoli Saygin et al. 2022
                      - S. endophytica Qin et al. 2021
        - - - - S. subtropica Wu et al. 2016
              - S. thermophila Lu et al. 2001
            - - S. rosea Yassin 2009
              - - S. qijiaojingensis Tang et al. 2009
                - S. rectivirgula (Krassilnikov and Agre 1964) Korn-Wendisch et al. 1989
          - - "S. pathumthaniensis" Sinma et al. 2011
            - - - S. hattusasensis Veyisoglu et al. 2018
                - S. spinosa Mertz and Yao 1990
              - - - S. elongata Saygin et al. 2022
                  - S. shandongensis Zhang et al. 2008
                - - - S. maritima Suksaard et al. 2018
                    - S. soli Veyisoglu et al. 2022
                  - - - S. hirsuta Lacey and Goodfellow 1975
                      - S. hordei Goodfellow et al. 1989
                    - - S. antimicrobica Yuan et al. 2008
                      - - S. indica Vaddavalli et al. 2014
                        - S. kobensis (Lacey 1989) Nouioui et al. 2018

120 marker proteins based GTDB 10-RS226

- Saccharopolyspora
  - - - S. taberi
      - S. erythraea [incl. S. spinosporotrichia]
    - - S. coralli Zhou et al. 2020
      - - S. gloriosae
        - S. gregorii
  - - S. cebuensis
    - - - S. rectivirgula
        - S. rosea
      - - - S. thermophila [incl. S. subtropica]
          - - S. soli
            - - S. phatthalungensis
              - - - S. elongata
                  - S. shandongensis
                - - "S. pogona" Lewer et al. 2009
                  - S. spinosa
        - - - S. hordei
            - - S. hirsuta
              - - S. oryzae Kammanee et al. 2024
                - - S. indica
                  - - S. antimicrobica
                    - S. kobensis
          - - S. halophila
            - - S. rhizosphaerae
              - - "S. mangrovi" Lu et al. 2024
                - - - S. flava
                    - "S. ipomoeae" Suksaard et al. 2024
                  - - S. dendranthemae
                    - - S. aridisoli
                      - S. endophytica

Species incertae sedis:

- "Faenia interjecta" Okazaki & Enokita 1987
- S. antibiotica Kanchanasin et al. 2025
- "S. aurantiaca" Jiang and Xu 1986
- S. cavernae Cheng et al. 2014
- "S. emeiensis" Yuan, Zhang & & Zhang 2007
- S. galaxeae Xie et al. 2025
- "S. griseoalba" Jiang et al. 2016
- S. montiporae Xie et al. 2025
- "S. qinghaiensis" Jiang et al. 2019
- "S. salina" Suthindhiran et al. 2009

== See also ==
- List of bacterial orders
- List of bacteria genera
