= Saccharopolyspora spinosa =

Scientific classification
- Domain: Bacteria
- Kingdom: Bacillati
- Phylum: Actinomycetota
- Class: Actinomycetes
- Order: Pseudonocardiales
- Family: Pseudonocardiaceae
- Genus: Saccharopolyspora
- Species: S. spinosa

Binomial name
- Saccharopolyspora spinosa Mertz and Yao 1990

Species of bacterium

Saccharopolyspora spinosa is a species of actinobacterium first isolated from an abandoned sugar mill in the Virgin Islands. It was discovered and described by researchers Mertz and Yao while collecting specimens to be screened for novel antibiotics. It develops aerial, pale, yellowish pink hyphae and bears long chains of spores encased in spiny spore sheaths. It can also reproduce by fragmentation in an aqueous environment. Its type strain is A83543.1 (= NRRL 18395).

Saccharopolyspora spinosa is the source of a family of insecticidal compounds called spinosyns. They act as neurotoxins by activation of nicotinic acetylcholine receptors in insects. The insecticide Spinetoram is composed of two synthetic derivatives of spinosyns.

== See also ==
- Spinosad
