= Multivorans =

Multivorans may refer to:

- Allokutzneria multivorans, species of bacteria
- Burkholderia multivorans, species of bacteria
- Desulfococcus multivorans, species of bacteria
- Epibacterium multivorans, species of bacteria
- Methylorhabdus multivorans, species of bacteria
- Sabulilitoribacter multivorans, species of bacteria
- Salana multivorans, species of bacteria
- Tenuibacillus multivorans, species of bacteria
- Winogradskyella multivorans, species of bacteria
- Youngiibacter multivorans, species of bacteria
