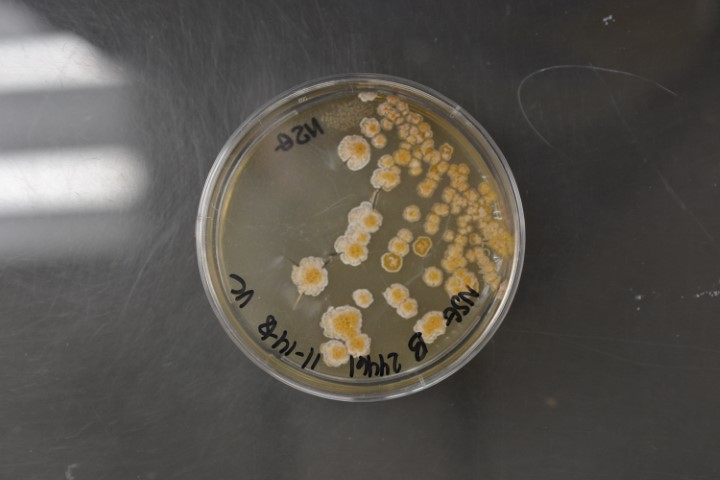

Scientific classification
- Domain: Bacteria
- Kingdom: Bacillati
- Phylum: Actinomycetota
- Class: Actinomycetia
- Order: Pseudonocardiales
- Family: Pseudonocardiaceae
- Genus: Allokutzneria
- Species: A. albata

Binomial name
- Allokutzneria albata (Tomita et al. 1993) Labeda and Kroppenstedt 2008

Type strain
- ATCC 55061; CGMCC 4.1881; DSM 44149; JCM 9917; KCTC 9837; NBRC 101910; NCIMB 13433; NRRL B-24461; R-761-7; SA-27176

Synonyms
- Kibdelosporangium albatum Tomita et al. 1993

= Allokutzneria albata =

Species of bacterium

Allokutzneria albata is a bacterium from the genus Allokutzneria which has been isolated from soil from the Mindanao Island on the Philippines. Allokutzneria albata produces the antivirals cycloviracin B1 and cycloviracin B2 as well as the antibiotic sequanamycin A (SEQ-503), a 14-membered ring erythromycin family macrolide against Mycobacterium tuberculosis, which was discovered in 1969.
