= Streptoalloteichus tenebrarius =

Scientific classification
- Domain: Bacteria
- Kingdom: Bacillati
- Phylum: Actinomycetota
- Class: Actinomycetia
- Order: Pseudonocardiales
- Family: Pseudonocardiaceae
- Genus: Streptoalloteichus
- Species: S. tenebrarius

Binomial name
- Streptoalloteichus tenebrarius (ex Higgins and Kastner, 1967) Tamura et al., 2008

Synonyms
- Streptomyces tenebrarius Higgins and Kastner 1967

Species of bacterium

Streptoalloteichus tenebrarius is a bacterium that biosynthesizes the aminoglycoside antibiotics tobramycin and apramycin.
