= Prauserella alba =

Scientific classification
- Domain: Bacteria
- Kingdom: Bacillati
- Phylum: Actinomycetota
- Class: Actinomycetes
- Order: Pseudonocardiales
- Family: Pseudonocardiaceae
- Genus: Prauserella
- Species: P. alba

Binomial name
- Prauserella alba Li et al. 2003

Type strain
- BCRC 16313; CCRC 16313; CCRCC 16313; CCTCC AA001016; CIP 107981; DSM 44590; JCM 13022; KCTC 19002; YIM 90005

Species of bacterium

Prauserella alba is a moderately halophilic bacterium from the genus Prauserella which has been isolated from saline soil in China.
