= Actinopolyspora xinjiangensis =

Scientific classification
- Domain: Bacteria
- Kingdom: Bacillati
- Phylum: Actinomycetota
- Class: Actinomycetes
- Order: Actinopolysporales
- Family: Actinopolysporaceae
- Genus: Actinopolyspora
- Species: A. xinjiangensis

Binomial name
- Actinopolyspora xinjiangensis Guan et al. 2011

Species of bacterium

Actinopolyspora xinjiangensis is a halophilic, filamentous actinobacterium. It is aerobic and Gram-positive, with type strain TRM 40136(T) (=CCTCC AA 209080(T) = KCTC 19656(T)).
