= Prauserella aidingensis =

Scientific classification
- Domain: Bacteria
- Kingdom: Bacillati
- Phylum: Actinomycetota
- Class: Actinomycetia
- Order: Pseudonocardiales
- Family: Pseudonocardiaceae
- Genus: Prauserella
- Species: P. aidingensis

Binomial name
- Prauserella aidingensis Li et al. 2009

Type strain
- CCTCC AA 208053; DSM 45266; YIM 90636

Species of bacterium

Prauserella aidingensis is a bacterium from the genus Prauserella which has been isolated from Aiding Lake in China.
