= Kibdelosporangium phytohabitans =

Scientific classification
- Domain: Bacteria
- Kingdom: Bacillati
- Phylum: Actinomycetota
- Class: Actinomycetia
- Order: Pseudonocardiales
- Family: Pseudonocardiaceae
- Genus: Kibdelosporangium
- Species: K. phytohabitans

Binomial name
- Kibdelosporangium phytohabitans Xing et al. 2012

Type strain
- CCTCC AA 2010001; KCTC 19775; KLBMP 1111

Species of bacterium

Kibdelosporangium phytohabitans is a bacterium from the genus Kibdelosporangium which has been isolated from seeds from the plant Jatropha curcas in Sichuan, China.
