= Michael Goodfellow =

British academic (1941–2024)

Michael Goodfellow MBE
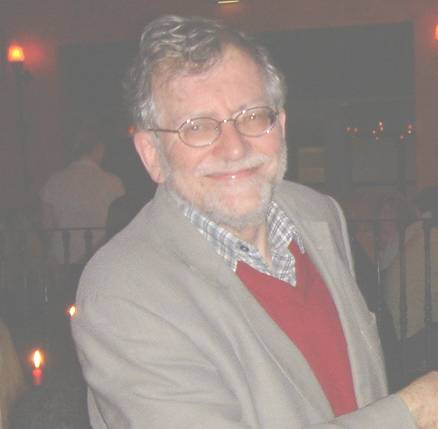
- Born: 8 January 1941; Ecclefechan, Scotland
- Died: 8 March 2024 (aged 83)
- Spouse: Punita Tanna (m. 1983)
- Children: 2
- Scientific career
- Fields: Taxonomist
- Workplaces: University of Newcastle upon Tyne

Michael Goodfellow MBE (8 January 1941 – 8 March 2024) was a British professor in microbial systematics, specialising in Actinomycetota taxonomy. He earlier served as head of the School of Biology in University of Newcastle upon Tyne. He was also the chair of the Bergey's Manual Trust. Goodfellow died on 8 March 2024, at the age of 83.

== Early life and education ==
Goodfellow was born in Ecclefechan, Scotland to mother Mary (née Wilson), who died when he was 3, and father Edwin Goodfellow. He grew up in Carlisle, Cumbria.

Goodfellow attended Carlisle Grammar School. He did both his undergraduate and postgraduate degrees at the University of Liverpool, graduating with PhD in 1966. He took a postdoctoral fellowship at Penn State, then as an MRC Junior Research Fellow at the University of Leicester. In 1969 he joined the then newly established University of Newcastle, where he later served as head of the School of Biology.

== Goodfellow in Newcastle University ==
In Newcastle he established and developed courses in microbial systematics and biotechnology and managed the Microbial Resource Laboratory (MRC) for over 30 years. The MRC has and remains focussed on the development and application of state-of-the-art procedures designed to advance the systematics, ecology and commercialisation of actinobacteria.

Key achievements at the University of Newcastle include

- Forty years research funding from sponsors such as the European Commission, Research Councils (BBSRC, ESRC, MRC and NERC), The British Council and industrial concerns, notably Glaxo Smith Kline, Novartis and Severn Trent Water (51 funded projects in total).
- Supervision of students who completed 62 PhDs., 4 M.Phils, and innumerable M.Sc's.
- International recognition for promoting actinobacterial biology and prokaryotic systematics, as exemplified by the award of international prizes, honorary degrees, and invitations to present keynote lectures at international symposia.

Owing to his contribution to microbial systematics, a bacterial genus of Actinomycetota was named after him as Goodfellowia.

== Educationist ==
Apart from his research activities he was involved in development of education in Newcastle-upon-Tyne. He was appointed a governor for Gosforth High School in 1974 and later elected the chair of governors in 1979, a post he still held. For his service in education he was named Member of the Order of the British Empire (MBE) in the 2010 New Year Honours list.

== Personal life ==
Goodfellow married Punita Tanna in 1983. The couple have two daughters Lena (born 1984) and Maya (born 1988). The family lived in Newcastle upon Tyne. Maya Goodfellow works as an academic and writer.

=== Politics ===
Goodfellow was a socialist and internationalist. He joined the Labour Party at age 18 and helped set up the affiliated Socialist Environment and Resources Association (SERA). Goodfellow resigned from Labour shortly before his death in 2024 "in protest of the party's direction of travel" under Keir Starmer's leadership.
