= Lentzea waywayandensis =

Scientific classification
- Domain: Bacteria
- Kingdom: Bacillati
- Phylum: Actinomycetota
- Class: Actinomycetia
- Order: Pseudonocardiales
- Family: Pseudonocardiaceae
- Genus: Lentzea
- Species: L. waywayandensis

Binomial name
- Lentzea waywayandensis (Labeda and Lyons 1989) Labeda et al. 2001

Type strain
- AS 4.1646; ATCC 51594; CGMCC 4.1646; DSM 44232; IFO 14970; IMSNU 21344; JCM 9114; KCTC 9400; LL-37Z-15; LLR-37Z-15; LLR-37Z-6; NBRC 14970; NCIMB 13164; NRRL B-16159; VKM Ac-1970

Synonyms
- Saccharothrix waywayandensis Labeda and Lyons 1989

Species of bacterium

Lentzea waywayandensis is a bacterium from the genus of Lentzea which has been isolated from soil from the Lake Waywayanda in New Jersey in the United States.
