= Haloechinothrix alba =

Scientific classification
- Domain: Bacteria
- Kingdom: Bacillati
- Phylum: Actinomycetota
- Class: Actinomycetia
- Order: Pseudonocardiales
- Family: Pseudonocardiaceae
- Genus: Haloechinothrix
- Species: H. alba

Binomial name
- Haloechinothrix alba Tang et al. 2010

Type strain
- CCTCC AB 208140; DSM 45207; YIM 93221

Species of bacterium

Haloechinothrix alba is a halophilic bacterium from the genus Haloechinothrix which has been isolated from soil from the Qijiaojing Lake in Xinjiang, China.
