= Lentzea flaviverrucosa =

Scientific classification
- Domain: Bacteria
- Kingdom: Bacillati
- Phylum: Actinomycetota
- Class: Actinomycetia
- Order: Pseudonocardiales
- Family: Pseudonocardiaceae
- Genus: Lentzea
- Species: L. flaviverrucosa

Binomial name
- Lentzea flaviverrucosa (ex Yan and Deng 1966) Xie et al. 2002

Type strain
- AS 4.0578; CGMCC 4.0578; CIP 107743; DSM 44664; JCM 11373; NBRC 100042

Species of bacterium

Lentzea flaviverrucosa is a Gram-positive bacterium from the genus Lentzea which has been isolated from soil in China.
