= Prauserella salsuginis =

Scientific classification
- Domain: Bacteria
- Kingdom: Bacillati
- Phylum: Actinomycetota
- Class: Actinomycetia
- Order: Pseudonocardiales
- Family: Pseudonocardiaceae
- Genus: Prauserella
- Species: P. salsuginis

Binomial name
- Prauserella salsuginis Li et al. 2009

Type strain
- CCTCC AA 208051; DSM 45264; YIM 90625

Synonyms
- Prauserella flava Li et al. 2009; Prauserella sediminis Li et al. 2009

Species of bacterium

Prauserella salsuginis is a bacterium from the genus Prauserella which has been isolated from the Aiding Lake in Xinjiang, China.
