= Prauserella soli =

Scientific classification
- Domain: Bacteria
- Kingdom: Bacillati
- Phylum: Actinomycetota
- Class: Actinomycetia
- Order: Pseudonocardiales
- Family: Pseudonocardiaceae
- Genus: Prauserella
- Species: P. soli

Binomial name
- Prauserella soli Almutairi 2015

Type strain
- DSM 45819; LMG 28346; Ku54; 12-833

Species of bacterium

Prauserella soli is a bacterium from the genus Prauserella which has been isolated from crude oil-contaminated soil in Kuwait. Prauserella soli has the ability to degrade crude oil.
