= Prauserella marina =

Scientific classification
- Domain: Bacteria
- Kingdom: Bacillati
- Phylum: Actinomycetota
- Class: Actinomycetia
- Order: Pseudonocardiales
- Family: Pseudonocardiaceae
- Genus: Prauserella
- Species: P. marina

Binomial name
- Prauserella marina Wang et al. 2010

Type strain
- CCTCC AA 208056; DSM 45268; MS498

Species of bacterium

Prauserella marina is a bacterium from the genus Prauserella which has been isolated from ocean sediments from the South China Sea near China.
