= Actinopolyspora righensis =

Scientific classification
- Domain: Bacteria
- Kingdom: Bacillati
- Phylum: Actinomycetota
- Class: Actinomycetes
- Order: Actinopolysporales
- Family: Actinopolysporaceae
- Genus: Actinopolyspora
- Species: A. righensis

Binomial name
- Actinopolyspora righensis Meklat et al. 2014

Species of bacterium

Actinopolyspora righensis is a halophilic actinomycete first isolated from Saharan soil in Algeria. Its aerial mycelium produce long, straight or flexuous spore chains with non-motile, smooth-surfaced and rod-shaped spores. Its type strain is H23^{T} (=DSM 45501^{T} = CCUG 63368^{T} = MTCC 11562^{T}).
