= Lentzea flava =

Scientific classification
- Domain: Bacteria
- Kingdom: Bacillati
- Phylum: Actinomycetota
- Class: Actinomycetia
- Order: Pseudonocardiales
- Family: Pseudonocardiaceae
- Genus: Lentzea
- Species: L. flava

Binomial name
- Lentzea flava (Gauze et al. 1974) Nouioui et al. 2018

Type strain
- AS 4.1715; ATCC 29533; BCRC 13328; CCRC 13328; CGMCC 4.1715; CIP 107110; DSM 43885; IFO 14521; IMET 9748; IMET 9848; IMSNU 21358; INA 2171; JCM 3296; KCC A-0296; KCCA-0296; KCTC 9393; NBRC 14521; NCIB 11447; NCIMB 11447; NRRL B-16131; VKM Ac-906

Synonyms
- Actinomadura flava Gauze et al. 1974 (Approved Lists 1980); Lechevalieria flava (Gauze et al. 1974) Labeda et al. 2001; Nocardiopsis flava (Gauze et al. 1974) Gauze and Sveshnikova 1985; Saccharothrix flava (Gauze et al. 1974) Grund and Kroppenstedt 1990

Species of bacterium

Lentzea flava is a bacterium from the genus Lentzea which has been isolated from soil. Lentzea flava produces madumycin.
