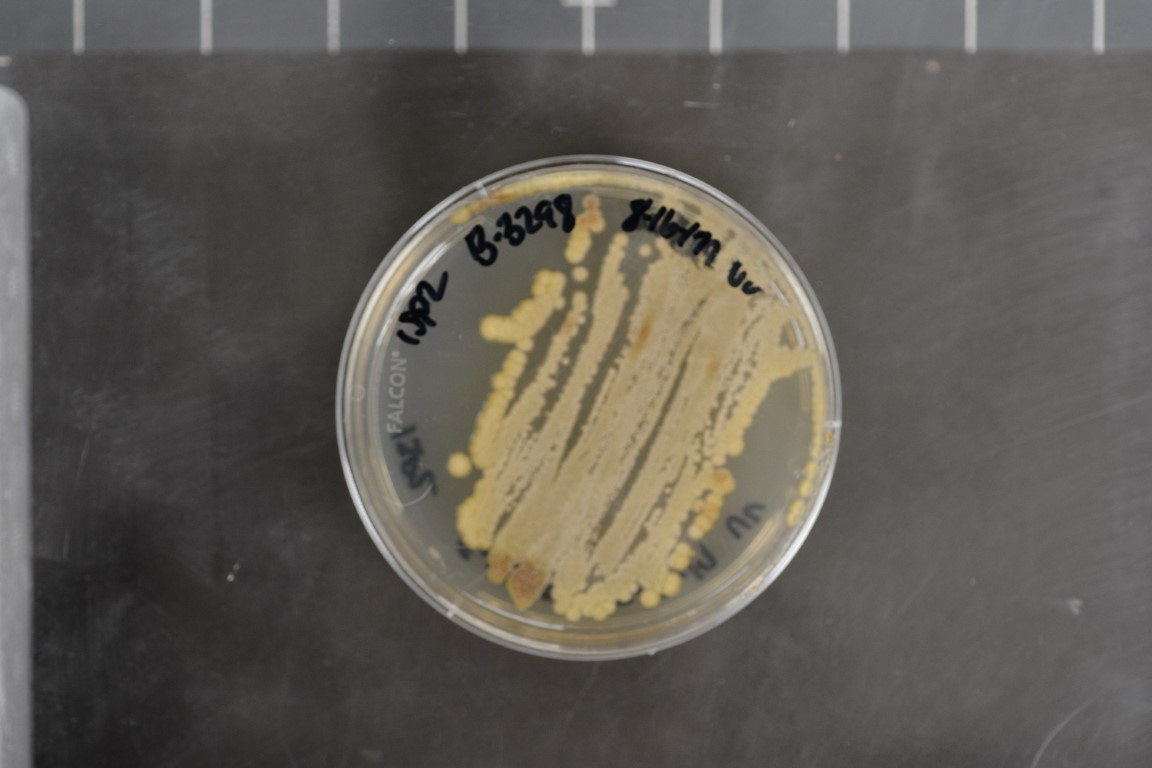

Scientific classification
- Domain: Bacteria
- Kingdom: Bacillati
- Phylum: Actinomycetota
- Class: Actinomycetia
- Order: Pseudonocardiales
- Family: Pseudonocardiaceae
- Genus: Lentzea
- Species: L. aerocolonigenes

Binomial name
- Lentzea aerocolonigenes (Labeda 1986) Nouioui et al. 2018

Type strain
- 4614; 701; AS 4.1712; ATCC 23870; BCRC 13661; CBS 60; CBS 609.68; CCM 2777; CCRC 13661; CGMCC 4.1712; CIP 107109; DSM 40034; IFO 1319; IFO 13195; IFO 3837; IMET 7515; IMSNU 21350; ISP 5034; JCM 4150; JCM 4614; KCC S-0150; KCC S-0614; KCTC 9379; MTCC 1533; MTCC 1553; NBRC 13195; NBRC 3837; NCIMB 12944; NRRL B-3298; NRRL ISP-5034; R. Shinobu 701; RIA 1108; Shinobu OEU 701; VKM Ac-1081

Synonyms
- Lechevalieria aerocolonigenes (Labeda 1986) Labeda et al. 2001; "Nocardia aerocolonigenes" (Shinobu and Kawato 1960) Pridham 1970; "Streptomyces aerocolonigenes" Shinobu and Kawato 1960; Streptomyces aerocolonigenes (ex Shinobu and Kawato 1960) Labeda 1986; subsp. aerocolonigenes (Labeda 1986) Takahashi et al. 1996; subsp. staurosporea corrig. (ex Ōmura et al. 1977) Takahashi et al. 1996

= Lentzea aerocolonigenes =

Species of bacterium

Lentzea aerocolonigenes is a bacterium from the genus Lentzea which has been isolated from soil in Japan. Lentzea aerocolonigenes produces rebeccamycin.
