= Prauserella isguenensis =

Scientific classification
- Domain: Bacteria
- Kingdom: Bacillati
- Phylum: Actinomycetota
- Class: Actinomycetia
- Order: Pseudonocardiales
- Family: Pseudonocardiaceae
- Genus: Prauserella
- Species: P. isguenensis

Binomial name
- Prauserella isguenensis Saker et al. 2015

Type strain
- CECT 8577; DSM 46664; H137; H225

Species of bacterium

Prauserella isguenensis is a halophilic bacterium from the genus Prauserella which has been isolated from desert soil in Algeria.
