= Actinopolyspora mortivallis =

Scientific classification
- Domain: Bacteria
- Kingdom: Bacillati
- Phylum: Actinomycetota
- Class: Actinomycetes
- Order: Actinopolysporales
- Family: Actinopolysporaceae
- Genus: Actinopolyspora
- Species: A. mortivallis

Binomial name
- Actinopolyspora mortivallis Yoshida et al. 1991

Species of bacterium

Actinopolyspora mortivallis is a bacterium with type strain HS-1 (= JCM 7550).
