= Lentzea kentuckyensis =

Scientific classification
- Domain: Bacteria
- Kingdom: Bacillati
- Phylum: Actinomycetota
- Class: Actinomycetia
- Order: Pseudonocardiales
- Family: Pseudonocardiaceae
- Genus: Lentzea
- Species: L. kentuckyensis

Binomial name
- Lentzea kentuckyensis Labeda et al. 2007

Type strain
- CIP 109797; DSM 44909; JCM 14913; LDDC 2876-05; NRRL B-24416

Species of bacterium

Lentzea kentuckyensis is a bacterium from the genus Lentzea which has been isolated from a placenta of an Equine in Lexington.
