= Prauserella halophila =

Scientific classification
- Domain: Bacteria
- Kingdom: Bacillati
- Phylum: Actinomycetota
- Class: Actinomycetia
- Order: Pseudonocardiales
- Family: Pseudonocardiaceae
- Genus: Prauserella
- Species: P. halophila

Binomial name
- Prauserella halophila Li et al. 2003

Type strain
- BCRC 16311; CCRC 16311; CCRCC 16311; CCTCC AA001015; CIP 107978; DSM 44617; JCM 13023; KCTC 19000; YIM 90001

Species of bacterium

Prauserella halophila is a moderately halophilic bacterium from the genus Prauserella which has been isolated from soil in Xinjiang, China.
