= Lentzea fradiae =

Scientific classification
- Domain: Bacteria
- Kingdom: Bacillati
- Phylum: Actinomycetota
- Class: Actinomycetia
- Order: Pseudonocardiales
- Family: Pseudonocardiaceae
- Genus: Lentzea
- Species: L. fradiae

Binomial name
- Lentzea fradiae (Zhang et al. 2007) Nouioui et al. 2018

Type strain
- AS 4.3506; CGMCC 4.3506; DSM 45099; JCM 14205; Z6

Synonyms
- Lechevalieria fradiae Zhang et al. 2007

Species of bacterium

Lentzea fradiae is a bacterium from the genus Lentzea which has been isolated from soil in China.
