= Lentzea californiensis =

Scientific classification
- Domain: Bacteria
- Kingdom: Bacillati
- Phylum: Actinomycetota
- Class: Actinomycetia
- Order: Pseudonocardiales
- Family: Pseudonocardiaceae
- Genus: Lentzea
- Species: L. californiensis

Binomial name
- Lentzea californiensis Labeda et al. 2001

Type strain
- CGMCC 4.2094; DSM 43393; IMRU 550; JCM 11305; KCTC 19912; NRLL B-16137; NRRL B-16137; UCLA C30

Species of bacterium

Lentzea californiensis is a bacterium from the genus Lentzea which has been isolated from soil in California.
