= Lentzea nigeriaca =

Scientific classification
- Domain: Bacteria
- Kingdom: Bacillati
- Phylum: Actinomycetota
- Class: Actinomycetia
- Order: Pseudonocardiales
- Family: Pseudonocardiaceae
- Genus: Lentzea
- Species: L. nigeriaca

Binomial name
- Lentzea nigeriaca (Camas et al. 2013) Nouioui et al. 2018

Type strain
- DSM 45680; KCTC 29057; NJ2035; NRRL B-24881; NRRLB-24881

Synonyms
- Lechevalieria nigeriaca Camas et al. 2013

Species of bacterium

Lentzea nigeriaca is a bacterium from the genus Lentzea which has been isolated from soil from Abuja, Nigeria.
