= Lentzea jiangxiensis =

Scientific classification
- Domain: Bacteria
- Kingdom: Bacillati
- Phylum: Actinomycetota
- Class: Actinomycetia
- Order: Pseudonocardiales
- Family: Pseudonocardiaceae
- Genus: Lentzea
- Species: L. jiangxiensis

Binomial name
- Lentzea jiangxiensis Li et al. 2012

Type strain
- CGMCC 4.6609; FXJ1.034; NBRC 106680

Species of bacterium

Lentzea jiangxiensis is a bacterium from the genus Lentzea which has been isolated from acidic soil in Jiangxi, China.
