= Kibdelosporangium philippinense =

Scientific classification
- Domain: Bacteria
- Kingdom: Bacillati
- Phylum: Actinomycetota
- Class: Actinomycetia
- Order: Pseudonocardiales
- Family: Pseudonocardiaceae
- Genus: Kibdelosporangium
- Species: K. philippinense

Binomial name
- Kibdelosporangium philippinense Mertz and Yao 1988

Type strain
- A80407; ATCC 49844; DSM 44226; IFO 14839; IFO 15154; JCM 9918; KCTC 9838; NBRC 14839; NBRC 15154; NCIMB 13200; NRRL 18198

Species of bacterium

Kibdelosporangium philippinense is a bacterium from the genus of Kibdelosporangium which has been isolated from soil on the Philippines.
