= Streptoalloteichus =

Scientific classification
- Domain: Bacteria
- Kingdom: Bacillati
- Phylum: Actinomycetota
- Class: Actinomycetes
- Order: Pseudonocardiales
- Family: Pseudonocardiaceae
- Genus: Streptoalloteichus (ex Tomita et al. 1978) Tomita et al. 1987

Type species
- Streptoalloteichus hindustanus (ex Tomita et al. 1978) Tomita et al. 1987

Species
- S. hindustanus; S. tenebrarius

Genus of bacteria

Streptoalloteichus is a genus of bacteria within the family Pseudonocardiaceae that contains two known species:

- S. hindustanus, which is known for the production of tallysomycin, an antitumor antibiotic;
- S. tenebrarius, which is known for production of tobramycin, and which was previously classified as Streptomyces tenebrarius.

== Phylogeny ==
The currently accepted taxonomy is based on the List of Prokaryotic names with Standing in Nomenclature (LPSN) and National Center for Biotechnology Information (NCBI).

16S rRNA based LTP_10_2024

- Streptoalloteichus
  - S. hindustanus Tomita et al. 1978 ex Tomita et al. 1987
  - S. tenebrarius Higgins & Kastner 1967 ex Tamura et al. 2008

120 marker proteins based GTDB 10-RS226

- Streptoalloteichus
  - S. hindustanus
  - S. tenebrarius

== See also ==
- List of bacterial orders
- List of bacteria genera
