= Kibdelosporangium lantanae =

Scientific classification
- Domain: Bacteria
- Kingdom: Bacillati
- Phylum: Actinomycetota
- Class: Actinomycetia
- Order: Pseudonocardiales
- Family: Pseudonocardiaceae
- Genus: Kibdelosporangium
- Species: K. lantanae

Binomial name
- Kibdelosporangium lantanae Li et al. 2015

Type strain
- KCTC 29675; X5-6; XMU 506

Species of bacterium

Kibdelosporangium lantanae is a bacterium from the genus Kibdelosporangium which has been isolated from soil from the plant Lantana camara in Xiamen, China.
