= Actinopolyspora halophila =

Scientific classification
- Domain: Bacteria
- Kingdom: Bacillati
- Phylum: Actinomycetota
- Class: Actinomycetes
- Order: Actinopolysporales
- Family: Actinopolysporaceae
- Genus: Actinopolyspora
- Species: A. halophila

Binomial name
- Actinopolyspora halophila Gochnauer et al. 1975

Species of bacterium

Actinopolyspora halophila is a bacterium. It differs from its cogenerate bacteria in the make-up of its cell wall. Like all Actinopolyspora, A. halophila requires saline conditions for survival, however wild types generally require more than 12% salt concentration to grow, and can grow in concentrations of up to 30%.
