= Prauserella shujinwangii =

Scientific classification
- Domain: Bacteria
- Kingdom: Bacillati
- Phylum: Actinomycetota
- Class: Actinomycetia
- Order: Pseudonocardiales
- Family: Pseudonocardiaceae
- Genus: Prauserella
- Species: P. shujinwangii

Binomial name
- Prauserella shujinwangii Liu et al. 2014

Type strain
- CGMCC 4.7125; JCM 19736; XJ46

Species of bacterium

Prauserella shujinwangii is a Gram-positive, spore-forming and rod-shaped bacterium from the genus Prauserella which has been isolated in Xinjiang, China.
