= Lentzea albida =

Scientific classification
- Domain: Bacteria
- Kingdom: Bacillati
- Phylum: Actinomycetota
- Class: Actinomycetia
- Order: Pseudonocardiales
- Family: Pseudonocardiaceae
- Genus: Lentzea
- Species: L. albida

Binomial name
- Lentzea albida Labeda et al. 2001

Type strain
- AS 4.1727; CGMCC 4.1727; DSM 44437; IFO 16102; JCM 10670; KCTC 19911; NA 944235; NBRC 16102; NRRL B-24073

Synonyms
- "Asiosporangium albidum" Runmao et al. 1995

Species of bacterium

Lentzea albida is a bacterium from the genus Lentzea which has been isolated from soil in Jiangxi, China. Lentzea albida produces staurosporine.
