= Salinifilum ghardaiense =

Scientific classification
- Domain: Bacteria
- Kingdom: Bacillati
- Phylum: Actinomycetota
- Class: Actinomycetia
- Order: Pseudonocardiales
- Family: Pseudonocardiaceae
- Genus: Salinifilum
- Species: S. ghardaiense

Binomial name
- Salinifilum ghardaiense corrig. (Meklat et al. 2014) Moshtaghi Nikou et al. 2017

Type strain
- CCUG 63370, CECT 8304, DSM 45606, H53

Synonyms
- Saccharopolyspora ghardaiensis Meklat et al. 2014; Salinifilum ghardaiensis (Meklat et al. 2014) Moshtaghi Nikou et al. 2017

Species of bacterium

Salinifilum ghardaiense is an extremely halophilic bacterium from the genus Salinifilum which has been isolated from sahara soil from Chaâbet Ntissa, M'zab, Ghardaïa Province, Algeria.
