= Lentzea albidocapillata =

Scientific classification
- Domain: Bacteria
- Kingdom: Bacillati
- Phylum: Actinomycetota
- Class: Actinomycetia
- Order: Pseudonocardiales
- Family: Pseudonocardiaceae
- Genus: Lentzea
- Species: L. albidocapillata

Binomial name
- Lentzea albidocapillata Yassin et al. 1995

Type strain
- AS 4.1519; ATCC 51859; CCUG 48294; CGMCC 4.1519; CIP 104842; CIP 107111; D-958; DSM 44073; HUT-6595; IFO 15855; IMMIB D-958; IMSNU 21253; JCM 9732; KACC 20017; NBRC 100372; NBRC 15855; NRRL B-24057

Synonyms
- Lentzea violacea (Lee et al. 2000) Labeda et al. 2001; Saccharothrix albidocapillata (Yassin et al. 1995) Lee et al. 2000; Saccharothrix violacea Lee et al. 2000

Species of bacterium

Lentzea albidocapillata is a Gram-positive bacterium from the genus Lentzea which has been isolated from tissue specimen of a patient in Germany.
