= Lentzea guizhouensis =

Scientific classification
- Domain: Bacteria
- Kingdom: Bacillati
- Phylum: Actinomycetota
- Class: Actinomycetia
- Order: Pseudonocardiales
- Family: Pseudonocardiaceae
- Genus: Lentzea
- Species: L. guizhouensis

Binomial name
- Lentzea guizhouensis Cao et al. 2016

Type strain
- CGMCC 4.7203; KCTC 29677; DHS C013

Species of bacterium

Lentzea guizhouensis is a lithophilous bacterium from the genus Lentzea which has been isolated from limestone from the Karst area in Guizhou, China.
