= Kibdelosporangium banguiense =

Scientific classification
- Domain: Bacteria
- Kingdom: Bacillati
- Phylum: Actinomycetota
- Class: Actinomycetia
- Order: Pseudonocardiales
- Family: Pseudonocardiaceae
- Genus: Kibdelosporangium
- Species: K. banguiense

Binomial name
- Kibdelosporangium banguiense Pascual et al. 2016

Type strain
- DSM 46670; F-240,109; LMG 28181

Species of bacterium

Kibdelosporangium banguiense is a Gram-positive, aerobic and non-motile bacterium from the genus Kibdelosporangium which has been isolated from soil from the forest of Pama in the Central African Republic.
