= Actinokineospora iranica =

Scientific classification
- Domain: Bacteria
- Kingdom: Bacillati
- Phylum: Actinomycetota
- Class: Actinomycetia
- Order: Pseudonocardiales
- Family: Pseudonocardiaceae
- Genus: Actinokineospora
- Species: A. iranica

Binomial name
- Actinokineospora iranica (Nikou et al. 2014) Nouioui et al. 2018

Type strain
- CECT 8209; Chem10; IBRC-M 10403

Synonyms
- Alloactinosynnema iranicum Nikou et al. 2014

Species of bacterium

Actinokineospora iranica is a Gram-positive and strictly aerobic bacterium from the genus Actinokineospora which has been isolated from soil from hypersaline wetland from Inche-Broun, Golestan province, Iran.
