= Kibdelosporangium metalli =

Scientific classification
- Domain: Bacteria
- Kingdom: Bacillati
- Phylum: Actinomycetota
- Class: Actinomycetia
- Order: Pseudonocardiales
- Family: Pseudonocardiaceae
- Genus: Kibdelosporangium
- Species: K. metalli

Binomial name
- Kibdelosporangium metalli Cao et al. 2017

Type strain
- CCTCC AA 2016002; KCTC 39719; KC 266

Species of bacterium

Kibdelosporangium metalli is a Gram-positive bacterium from the genus Kibdelosporangium which has been isolated from an earth mine in Bayan Obo, China.
