= Allokutzneria oryzae =

Scientific classification
- Domain: Bacteria
- Kingdom: Bacillati
- Phylum: Actinomycetota
- Class: Actinomycetia
- Order: Pseudonocardiales
- Family: Pseudonocardiaceae
- Genus: Allokutzneria
- Species: A. oryzae

Binomial name
- Allokutzneria oryzae Duangmal et al. 2014

Type strain
- R8-39; BCC 60399; NBRC 109649

Species of bacterium

Allokutzneria oryzae is a bacterium from the genus Allokutzneria which has been isolated from the rhizospheric soil from the rice-plant (Oryza sativa).
