= Lentzea atacamensis =

Scientific classification
- Domain: Bacteria
- Kingdom: Bacillati
- Phylum: Actinomycetota
- Class: Actinomycetia
- Order: Pseudonocardiales
- Family: Pseudonocardiaceae
- Genus: Lentzea
- Species: L. atacamensis

Binomial name
- Lentzea atacamensis (Okoro et al. 2010) Nouioui et al. 2018

Type strain
- CGMCC 4.5536; DSM 45479; JCM 17492; C61; NRRL B-24706

Synonyms
- Lechevalieria atacamensis Okoro et al. 2010; Lechevalieria deserti Okoro et al. 2010; Lentzea deserti (Okoro et al. 2010) Nouioui et al. 2018

Species of bacterium

Lentzea atacamensis is a bacterium from the genus Lentzea which has been isolated from the Atacama Desert in Chile.
