= Actinophytocola xanthii =

Scientific classification
- Domain: Bacteria
- Kingdom: Bacillati
- Phylum: Actinomycetota
- Class: Actinomycetia
- Order: Pseudonocardiales
- Family: Pseudonocardiaceae
- Genus: Actinophytocola
- Species: A. xanthii

Binomial name
- Actinophytocola xanthii Wang et al. 2017

Type strain
- 11-183; MCCC 1K02062; KCTC 39690

Species of bacterium

Actinophytocola xanthii is a bacterium from the genus of Actinophytocola which has been isolated from rhizosphere soil from the plant Xanthium strumarium in Tangshan, China.
