= Prauserella coralliicola =

Scientific classification
- Domain: Bacteria
- Kingdom: Bacillati
- Phylum: Actinomycetota
- Class: Actinomycetia
- Order: Pseudonocardiales
- Family: Pseudonocardiaceae
- Genus: Prauserella
- Species: P. coralliicola

Binomial name
- Prauserella coralliicola Wu et al. 2014

Type strain
- DSM 45821; NBRC 109418; SCSIO 11529

Synonyms
- Prauserella endophytica Liu et al. 2015

Species of bacterium

Prauserella coralliicola is a Gram-positive bacterium from the genus Prauserella which has been isolated from the coral Galaxea fascicularis from the Luhuitou fringing reef in China.
