= Actinorectispora indica =

Scientific classification
- Domain: Bacteria
- Kingdom: Bacillati
- Phylum: Actinomycetota
- Class: Actinomycetes
- Order: Pseudonocardiales
- Family: Pseudonocardiaceae
- Genus: Actinorectispora
- Species: A. indica

Binomial name
- Actinorectispora indica Quadri et al. 2016

Type strain
- CCTCC AA 209065; DSM 45410; YIM 75728; YIM 75722; YIM 75726

Species of bacterium

Actinorectispora indica is a Gram-positive and aerobic bacterium from the genus of Actinorectispora which has been isolated from soil from Kurnool in India.
