= Lentzea roselyniae =

Scientific classification
- Domain: Bacteria
- Kingdom: Bacillati
- Phylum: Actinomycetota
- Class: Actinomycetia
- Order: Pseudonocardiales
- Family: Pseudonocardiaceae
- Genus: Lentzea
- Species: L. roselyniae

Binomial name
- Lentzea roselyniae (Okoro et al. 2010) Nouioui et al. 2018

Type strain
- CGMCC 4.5537; DSM 45481; JCM 17494; C81; NRRL B-24708

Synonyms
- Lechevalieria roselyniae Okoro et al. 2010

Species of bacterium

Lentzea roselyniae is a Gram-positive and aerobic bacterium from the genus Lentzea which has been isolated from hyperarid soil. Lentzea roselyniae is named after Roselyn Brown.
