= L-ornithine N5 monooxygenase =

Enzyme

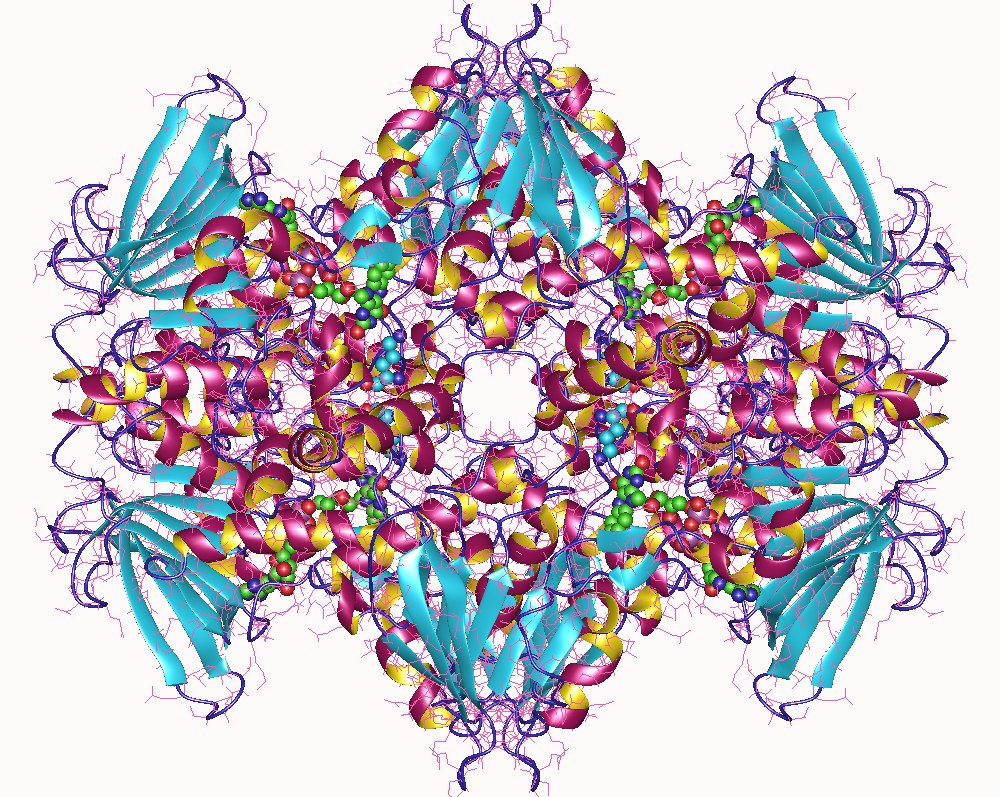
- Ornithine monooxygenase tetramer, Aspergillus fumigatus

Identifiers
- EC no.: 1.14.13.196

Databases
- IntEnz: IntEnz view
- BRENDA: BRENDA entry
- ExPASy: NiceZyme view
- KEGG: KEGG entry
- MetaCyc: metabolic pathway
- PRIAM: profile
- PDB structures: RCSB PDB PDBe PDBsum
Search
- PMC: articles
- PubMed: articles
- NCBI: proteins

L-ornithine N5 monooxygenase (EC 1.14.13.195 or EC 1.14.13.196) is an enzyme which catalyzes one of the following chemical reactions:

L-ornithine + NADPH + O_{2} $\rightleftharpoons$ N(5)-hydroxy-L-ornithine + NADP^{+} + H_{2}O L-ornithine + NAD(P)H + O_{2} $\rightleftharpoons$ N(5)-hydroxy-L-ornithine + NAD(P)^{+} + H_{2}O

The three ligands of this enzyme are L-ornithine (substrate), FAD (cofactor), and NADPH or NAD(P)H (cofactor and electron donor).

== Enzyme classification ==
L-ornithine N5 monooxygenase is classified under two EC numbers - EC1.14.13.195 and EC 1.14.13.196. The first number, 1, identifies the enzyme as an oxidoreductase. The subsequent 14 refers to the fact that this enzyme acts "on paired donors, with incorporation or reduction of molecular oxygen". The 13 identifies this enzyme as using NADH or NAD(P)H as one donor, while incorporating one atom of oxygen onto the other. This is why there are two EC numbers for this enzyme - one ends with 195 referring to NADPH as the donor, while the 196 refers to NAD(P)H as the donor.

== Structure ==
L-ornithine N5 monooxygenase adopbts an oxidoreductase Rossmann fold tertiary structure that binds FAD and NADP cofactors.

Crystallographic structures have been solved for this class of enzymes from Aspergillus fumigatus. These structures reflect structural changes which take place when the enzyme binds combinations of ligands, including ornithine and NADP. Additional structures have also been solved for strain Af293. These structures reflect different redox and ligation states. The following table briefly describes these crystal structures:

PDB Accession Code	Description	A. fumigatus strain	Source
4NZH	r279a mutant	parent	
4B63	bound to NADP and ornithine	"	
4B64	bound to NADP and lysine	"	
4B65	reduced and bound to NADPH	"	
4B66	reduced and bound to NADP and arginine	"	
4B67	re-oxidized and bound to NADP and ornithine	"	
4B68	re-oxidized and bound to NADP and arginine	"	
4B69	bound to ornithine	"	
5CKU	mutant N323A bound to NADP and ornithine	Af293	
6X0H	oxidized	"	
6X0I	oxidized and bound to NADP+	"	
6X0J	reduced and bound to NADP+ and L-ornithine	"	
6X0K	reduced and bound to L-ornithine	"	
7JVK	resting state	"	
7JVL	M101A variant complexed with NADP+	"	

In A. fumigatus, the enzyme is named Af SidA for siderophore biosynthesis protein A. It has three domains for ornithine (substrate), FAD (cofactor), and NAD(P)H (cofactor and electron donor). The enzyme is a homotetramer.

N-hydroxylating flavin-containing monooxygenase (NMO) enzymes such as this target the nucleophilic terminal amine groups of primary aliphatic amines such as L-ornithine. The enzyme operates via a multistep oxidative mechanism which has a C4a-hydroperoxyflavin intermediate. SidA stabilizes this intermediate and keeps NADP+ bound throughout the remainder of the catalytic cycle because it is necessary for intermediate stabilization. The nicotinamide-ribose moiety and H-bonding between the main chain and residues Lys107, Asn293, and Ser469 position the L-ornithine alpha carbon such that its side chain amino group can be hydroxylated by the C4a-(hydro)peroxyflavin. Unlike many other NMOs, A. fumigatus SidA strictly acts on ornithine. Interactions with arginine increase interactivity between the reduced flavin and oxygen.

The active site is located within a cleft at the interface between the three domains on each subunit. SidA has a resting state (6X0H) in which neither L-ornithine nor NAD(P)H is bound. This resting state has an "out" active site caused by large rotations of the FAD isoalloxazine and a 10-Å movement of the Tyrosine loop. Either flavin reduction or NAD(P)H binding drives the active site to the "in" conformation (6X0I).

SidA demonstrates typical kinetics when saturated with L-ornithine. Inhibition is caused by high concentrations of NADPH and NADH. There is an 8-fold increase in catalytic efficiency for NADPH compared to NADH. NADP+ is a competitive inhibitor with respect to NADPH.

== Function ==
This enzyme is widely distributed, especially among eukaryotes, being found in Fungi, Metazoa, Protista, Viridiplantae, Choanoflagellates, and Icththyosporeans. Among Bacteria, it is found in Kutzneria sp. 744, and an ornithine hydroxylase from Pseudomonas aeruginosa has a similar structure and 41% amino acid similarity to that of A. nidulans.

In addition to being found in the non-pathogenic fungi such as Aspergillus nidulans, it is also found in many fungal pathogens such as Aspergillus fumigatus, Botrytis cinerea, Fusarium oxysporum, Magnaporthe oryzae, Sclerotinia sclerotiorum, Spizellomyces punctatus, and Ustilago maydis.

In A. fumigatus, it is classified as a flavoprotein because FAD is a cofactor. It catalyzes the FAD and NADPH-dependent hydroxylation of L-ornithine in biosynthesis of the ferrichrome siderophores triacetylfusarinine and desferriferricrocin. It is produced primarily under iron-limited conditions. Siderophores are also important for virulence.

In Kutzneria sp. 744, this enzyme is involved in the biosynthesis of piperazate, which contributes to the biosynthesis of kutzneride antifungal antibiotics.
