= Lentzea xinjiangensis =

Scientific classification
- Domain: Bacteria
- Kingdom: Bacillati
- Phylum: Actinomycetota
- Class: Actinomycetia
- Order: Pseudonocardiales
- Family: Pseudonocardiaceae
- Genus: Lentzea
- Species: L. xinjiangensis

Binomial name
- Lentzea xinjiangensis (Wang et al. 2007) Nouioui et al. 2018

Type strain
- CGMCC 4.3525; DSM 45081; JCM 15473; R24

Synonyms
- Lechevalieria xinjiangensis Wang et al. 2007

Species of bacterium

Lentzea xinjiangensis is a bacterium from the genus Lentzea which has been isolated from soil in Xinjiang, China.
