= Actinokineospora alba =

Scientific classification
- Domain: Bacteria
- Kingdom: Bacillati
- Phylum: Actinomycetota
- Class: Actinomycetia
- Order: Pseudonocardiales
- Family: Pseudonocardiaceae
- Genus: Actinokineospora
- Species: A. alba

Binomial name
- Actinokineospora alba (Yuan et al. 2010) Nouioui et al. 2018

Type strain
- 03-9939; CCM 7461; DSM 45114; JCM 17965; KCTC 19294

Synonyms
- Alloactinosynnema album Yuan et al. 2010

Species of bacterium

Actinokineospora alba is a Gram-positive and aerobic bacterium from the genus of Actinokineospora which has been isolated from soil from Xinjiang, China.
