= Prauserella rugosa =

Scientific classification
- Domain: Bacteria
- Kingdom: Bacillati
- Phylum: Actinomycetota
- Class: Actinomycetia
- Order: Pseudonocardiales
- Family: Pseudonocardiaceae
- Genus: Prauserella
- Species: P. rugosa

Binomial name
- Prauserella rugosa (Lechevalier et al. 1986) Kim and Goodfellow 1999

Type strain
- AJ9109; ATCC 43014; BCRC 12523; BRRL B-2295; CBS 614.67; CCRC 12523; CGMCC 4.1215; CIP 106520; CMI 71674; DSM 43194; HUT-6557; IFO 14506; IMET 7650; IMI 071674; IMRU 3760; JCM 3193; JCM 9736; KCC A-0193; KCCA-0193; KCTC 9299; KCTC 9427; KCTC 9942; NBRC 14506; NCIB 8926; NCIMB 11010; NCIMB 8926; NRRL 2295; NRRL B-2295; PCM 2309; VKM Ac-1243

Synonyms
- Amycolatopsis rugosa (ex di Marco and Spalla 1957) Lechevalier et al. 1986; Nocardia rugosa (Lechevalier et al. 1986) Goodfellow and Lechevalier 1988; "Nocardia rugosa" di Marco and Spalla 1957; "Proactinomyces rugosa" (di Marco and Spalla 1957) Krasil'nikov 1981

Species of bacterium

Prauserella rugosa is a bacterium from the genus Prauserella which has been isolated from the rumen of cattle.
