= Lentzea =

Scientific classification
- Domain: Bacteria
- Kingdom: Bacillati
- Phylum: Actinomycetota
- Class: Actinomycetes
- Order: Pseudonocardiales
- Family: Pseudonocardiaceae
- Genus: Lentzea; Yassin et al. 1995

Type species
- Lentzea albidocapillata Yassin et al. 1995

Species
- See text

Synonyms
- "Asiosporangium" Runmao, Guizhen & Junying 1995; Lechevalieria Labeda et al. 2001

Genus of bacteria

Lentzea is a Gram-positive, mesophilic and aerobic genus from the family Pseudonocardiaceae.

== Phylogeny ==
The currently accepted taxonomy is based on the List of Prokaryotic names with Standing in Nomenclature (LPSN) and National Center for Biotechnology Information (NCBI).

16S rRNA based LTP_10_2024

- Lentzea
  - - L. chajnantorensis Idris et al. 2017
    - L. fradiae (Zhang et al. 2007) Nouioui et al. 2018
  - - - - L. aerocolonigenes (Labeda 1986) Nouioui et al. 2018
        - L. rhizosphaerae (Zhao et al. 2017) Yang and Zhi 2020
      - - L. flava (Gauze et al. 1974) Nouioui et al. 2018
        - - L. nigeriaca (Camas et al. 2013) Nouioui et al. 2018
          - - L. xinjiangensis (Wang et al. 2007) Nouioui et al. 2018
            - - L. atacamensis (Okoro et al. 2010) Nouioui et al. 2018
              - - L. roselyniae (Okoro et al. 2010) Nouioui et al. 2018
                - L. deserti (Okoro et al. 2010) Nouioui et al. 2018
    - - L. kentuckyensis Labeda et al. 2007
      - - L. alba Sun et al. 2021
        - - L. albida Labeda et al. 2001
          - - - L. cavernae Fang et al. 2017
              - L. pudingi Cao et al. 2017
            - - L. waywayandensis (Labeda and Lyons 1989) Labeda et al. 2001
              - - - - L. soli Li et al. 2018
                    - L. terrae Li et al. 2018
                  - - L. guizhouensis Cao et al. 2016
                    - L. jiangxiensis Li et al. 2012
                - - L. violacea (Lee et al. 2000) Labeda et al. 2001
                  - - L. flaviverrucosa (ex Yan and Deng 1966) Xie et al. 2002
                    - - L. californiensis Labeda et al. 2001
                      - L. albidocapillata Yassin et al. 1995

120 marker proteins based GTDB 10-RS226

- Lentzea
  - L. tibetensis Huang & Huang 2021
  - - L. guizhouensis
    - - - L. aerocolonigenes
        - - L. atacamensis
          - - L. flava
            - L. nigeriaca
      - - - L. terrae
          - - - "L. indica" Maiti and Mandal 2020
              - L. miocenica Lara et al. 2024
            - - L. alba
              - L. kentuckyensis
        - - L. xinjiangensis
          - - L. fradiae
            - - L. jiangxiensis
              - - L. albida
                - - L. cavernae
                  - - L. pudingi
                    - - - L. sokolovensis Lara et al. 2024
                        - L. waywayandensis
                      - - L. kristufekii Lara et al. 2024
                        - - L. californiensis
                          - - L. albidocapillata
                            - L. violacea

Species incertae sedis:

- "L. isolaginshaensis" Wang et al. 2019
- "L. xerophila" Wen et al. 2025

== See also ==
- List of bacterial orders
- List of bacteria genera
