= Winogradskyella rapida =

Scientific classification
- Domain: Bacteria
- Kingdom: Pseudomonadati
- Phylum: Bacteroidota
- Class: Flavobacteriia
- Order: Flavobacteriales
- Family: Flavobacteriaceae
- Genus: Winogradskyella
- Species: W. rapida

Binomial name
- Winogradskyella rapida Pinhassi et al. 2009

Type strain
- SCB36

Species of bacterium

Winogradskyella rapida is a Gram-negative, aerobic, rod-shaped and heterotrophic bacterium from the genus Winogradskyella which has been isolated from protein-enriched seawater from Scripps Pier.
