= Haloactinomyces =

Scientific classification
- Domain: Bacteria
- Kingdom: Bacillati
- Phylum: Actinomycetota
- Class: Actinomycetes
- Order: Pseudonocardiales
- Family: Pseudonocardiaceae
- Genus: Haloactinomyces; Lai et al. 2017

Type species
- Haloactinomyces albus Lai et al. 2017

Species
- H. albus

Genus of bacteria

Haloactinomyces is a genus of bacteria in the family Pseudonocardiaceae.

== See also ==
- List of bacterial orders
- List of bacteria genera
