= Winogradskyella crassostreae =

Scientific classification
- Domain: Bacteria
- Kingdom: Pseudomonadati
- Phylum: Bacteroidota
- Class: Flavobacteriia
- Order: Flavobacteriales
- Family: Flavobacteriaceae
- Genus: Winogradskyella
- Species: W. crassostreae

Binomial name
- Winogradskyella crassostreae Park et al. 2015

Type strain
- TYO-19

Species of bacterium

Winogradskyella crassostreae is a Gram-negative, aerobic and rod-shaped bacterium from the genus Winogradskyella which has been isolated from a Pacific oyster.
