= Winogradskyella flava =

Scientific classification
- Domain: Bacteria
- Kingdom: Pseudomonadati
- Phylum: Bacteroidota
- Class: Flavobacteriia
- Order: Flavobacteriales
- Family: Flavobacteriaceae
- Genus: Winogradskyella
- Species: W. flava

Binomial name
- Winogradskyella flava Lee et al. 2017

Type strain
- SFD31

Species of bacterium

Winogradskyella flava is a Gram-negative and aerobic bacterium from the genus Winogradskyella which has been isolated from the alga Sargassum fulvellum from the South Sea in Korea.
