= Allokutzneria multivorans =

Scientific classification
- Domain: Bacteria
- Kingdom: Bacillati
- Phylum: Actinomycetota
- Class: Actinomycetia
- Order: Pseudonocardiales
- Family: Pseudonocardiaceae
- Genus: Allokutzneria
- Species: A. multivorans

Binomial name
- Allokutzneria multivorans Cao et al. 2013

Type strain
- DSM 45532; JCM 17342; YIM 120521

Species of bacterium

Allokutzneria multivorans is a bacterium from the genus Allokutzneria which has been isolated from soil from a river bank from the Nujiang River in Yunnan, China.
