= Tenuibacillus =

Scientific classification
- Domain: Bacteria
- Kingdom: Bacillati
- Phylum: Bacillota
- Class: Bacilli
- Order: Bacillales
- Family: Alkalibacillaceae
- Genus: Tenuibacillus; Ren and Zhou 2005

Type species
- Tenuibacillus multivorans Ren & Zhou 2005

Species
- T. halotolerans; T. multivorans

Synonyms
- Tenuebacillus (sic)

Genus of bacteria

Tenuibacillus is a genus of bacteria from the family of Bacillaceae.

== Phylogeny ==
The currently accepted taxonomy is based on the List of Prokaryotic names with Standing in Nomenclature (LPSN) and National Center for Biotechnology Information (NCBI).

16S rRNA based LTP_10_2024

- - Tenuibacillus multivorans Ren & Zhou 2005
  - - Tenuibacillus halotolerans Gao et al. 2021
    - Aquisalibacillus

120 marker proteins based GTDB 09-RS220

- - Tenuibacillus multivorans
  - - Aquisalibacillus
    - other

== See also ==
- List of bacterial orders
- List of bacteria genera
