= Haloechinothrix =

Scientific classification
- Domain: Bacteria
- Kingdom: Bacillati
- Phylum: Actinomycetota
- Class: Actinomycetes
- Order: Pseudonocardiales
- Family: Pseudonocardiaceae
- Genus: Haloechinothrix; Tang et al. 2010

Type species
- Haloechinothrix alba Tang et al. 2010

Species
- H. aidingensis; H. alba; H. halophila; H. salitolerans

Genus of bacteria

Haloechinothrix is a genus from the family Pseudonocardiaceae.

== Phylogeny ==
The currently accepted taxonomy is based on the List of Prokaryotic names with Standing in Nomenclature (LPSN) and National Center for Biotechnology Information (NCBI).

16S rRNA based LTP_10_2024

- - Haloechinothrix alba
  - - Sciscionella
    - Thermocrispum

120 marker proteins based GTDB 10-RS226

- - - Haloechinothrix
      - H. aidingensis Yang et al. 2021
      - H. alba Tang et al. 2010
  - - - Haloechinothrix_A
        - Haloechinothrix halophila (Tang et al. 2010) Nouioui et al. 2018
        - Haloechinothrix salitolerans (Guan et al. 2012) Nouioui et al. 2018
    - Thermocrispum

== See also ==
- List of bacterial orders
- List of bacteria genera
