= Winogradskyella jejuensis =

Scientific classification
- Domain: Bacteria
- Kingdom: Pseudomonadati
- Phylum: Bacteroidota
- Class: Flavobacteriia
- Order: Flavobacteriales
- Family: Flavobacteriaceae
- Genus: Winogradskyella
- Species: W. jejuensis

Binomial name
- Winogradskyella jejuensis Kim and Oh 2015

Type strain
- CP32

Species of bacterium

Winogradskyella jejuensis is a Gram-negative and rod-shaped bacterium from the genus Winogradskyella which has been isolated from the alga Carpopeltis affinis from the coast of the Jeju Island.
