= Prauserella muralis =

Scientific classification
- Domain: Bacteria
- Kingdom: Bacillati
- Phylum: Actinomycetota
- Class: Actinomycetia
- Order: Pseudonocardiales
- Family: Pseudonocardiaceae
- Genus: Prauserella
- Species: P. muralis

Binomial name
- Prauserella muralis Schäfer et al. 2010

Type strain
- 05-Be-005; CCM 7635; CCUG 57426; DSM 45305; JCM 17974; NRRL B-24780

Species of bacterium

Prauserella muralis is a Gram-positive bacterium from the genus Prauserella which has been isolated from a wall which was colonized with mold in Berlin, Germany.
