= Prauserella =

Scientific classification
- Domain: Bacteria
- Kingdom: Bacillati
- Phylum: Actinomycetota
- Class: Actinomycetes
- Order: Pseudonocardiales
- Family: Pseudonocardiaceae
- Genus: Prauserella; Kim and Goodfellow 1999

Type species
- Prauserella rugosa (Lechevalier et al. 1986) Kim and Goodfellow 1999

Species
- See text

Genus of bacteria

Prauserella is a Gram-positive, aerobic and non-motile genus from the family of Pseudonocardiaceae.

== Phylogeny ==
The currently accepted taxonomy is based on the List of Prokaryotic names with Standing in Nomenclature (LPSN) and National Center for Biotechnology Information (NCBI).

16S rRNA based LTP_10_2024

- Prauserella
  - Prauserella shujinwangii Liu et al. 2014
  - - - Prauserella
        - - P. muralis Schäfer et al. 2010
          - P. soli Almutairi 2015
        - - - P. oleivorans Dastgheib et al. 2017
            - - - P. cavernicola Suriyachadkun et al. 2021
                - P. marina Wang et al. 2010
              - - P. flavalba Li et al. 2020
                - - P. coralliicola Wu et al. 2014
                  - P. endophytica Liu et al. 2015
          - - P. rugosa (Lechevalier et al. 1986) Kim and Goodfellow 1999
            - - - P. aidingensis Li et al. 2009
                - P. halophila Li et al. 2003
              - - P. alba Li et al. 2003
                - - P. isguenensis Saker et al. 2015
                  - - P. salsuginis Li et al. 2009
                    - P. sediminis Li et al. 2009
    - Saccharomonospora

120 marker proteins based GTDB 10-RS226

- Prauserella
  - - Saccharomonospora_A
    - - Prauserella_A
        - P. marina
        - - P. cavernicola
          - - P. coralliicola [incl. P. endophytica]
            - P. flavalba
  - - - Prauserella_B
        Prauserella muralis
    - - - Prauserella
          - P. rugosa
          - - P. halophila
            - - - P. aidingensis
                - P. isguenensis
              - - P. alba
                - P. salsuginis [incl. P. sediminis]
      - Saccharomonospora

== See also ==
- List of bacterial orders
- List of bacteria genera
