= Actinophytocola =

Scientific classification
- Domain: Bacteria
- Kingdom: Bacillati
- Phylum: Actinomycetota
- Class: Actinomycetes
- Order: Pseudonocardiales
- Family: Pseudonocardiaceae
- Genus: Actinophytocola; Indananda et al. 2010

Type species
- Actinophytocola oryzae Indananda et al. 2010

Species
- See text

Genus of bacteria

Actinophytocola is a genus in the phylum Actinomycetota (Bacteria).

== Etymology ==
The name Actinophytocola derives from the Greek noun actis or actinos, a ray, beam; Greek noun phyton, plant; Latin masculine gender suff. -cola (from Latin noun incola), a dweller, inhabitant; Neo-Latin masculine gender noun Actinophytocola, actinobacterial dweller inside a plant.

- A. burenkhanensis (Ara et al. 2011; Neo-Latin masculine gender adjective burenkhanensis, of or belonging to Burenkhan, isolated from soil of Burenkhan, Khuvsgul province, Mongolia.)
- A. corallina (Otoguro et al. 2011; Latin feminine gender adjective corallina, coral red, because the organism produces coral-coloured soluble pigment.)
- A. oryzae (Indananda et al. 2010, (Type species of the genus).; Latin noun oryza, rice and also the name of a botanical genus; Latin genitive case noun oryzae, of rice, denoting the isolation of the type strain from roots of Thai glutinous rice plants.)
- A. timorensis (Otoguro et al. 2011; Neo-Latin feminine gender adjective timorensis, of or pertaining to (West) Timor, Indonesia, from where the type strain was isolated.)

== Phylogeny ==
The currently accepted taxonomy is based on the List of Prokaryotic names with Standing in Nomenclature (LPSN) and National Center for Biotechnology Information (NCBI).

16S rRNA based LTP_10_2024

- Actinophytocola
  - A. gilvus Sun et al. 2014
  - - - A. oryzae Indananda et al. 2010
      - - A. burenkhanensis Ara et al. 2011
        - - A. glycyrrhizae Cao et al. 2018
          - - A. corallina Otoguro et al. 2011
            - A. timorensis Otoguro et al. 2011
    - - A. algeriensis Bouznada et al. 2016
      - - - A. sediminis Zhang et al. 2014
          - A. xinjiangensis Guo et al. 2011
        - - A. gossypii Ge et al. 2023
          - A. xanthii Wang et al. 2017

120 marker proteins based GTDB 10-RS226

- Actinophytocola
  - - A. algeriensis
    - A. oryzae
  - - A. xanthii
    - - A. gossypii
      - A. xinjiangensis

== See also ==
- Bacterial taxonomy
- List of bacterial orders
- List of bacteria genera
- Microbiology
