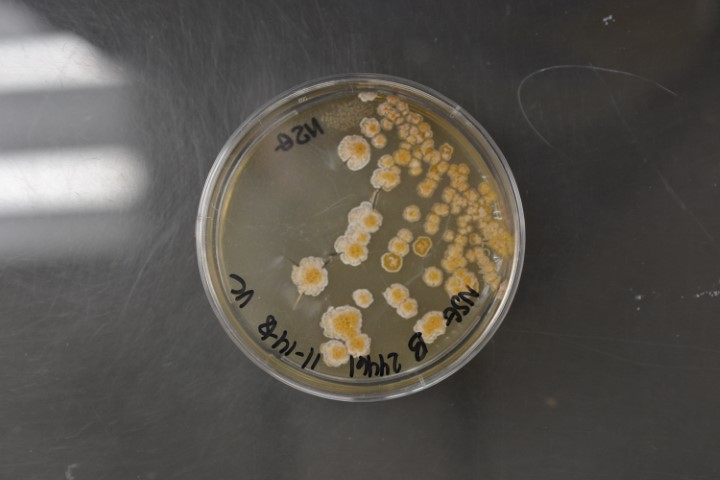
- Allokutzneria albata on agar plate

Scientific classification
- Domain: Bacteria
- Kingdom: Bacillati
- Phylum: Actinomycetota
- Class: Actinomycetes
- Order: Pseudonocardiales
- Family: Pseudonocardiaceae
- Genus: Allokutzneria; Labeda and Kroppenstedt 2008

Type species
- Allokutzneria albata (Tomita et al. 1993) Labeda and Kroppenstedt 2008

Species
- A. albata; A. multivorans; A. oryzae

= Allokutzneria =

Genus of bacteria

Allokutzneria is a genus from the family Pseudonocardiaceae.

== Phylogeny ==
The currently accepted taxonomy is based on the List of Prokaryotic names with Standing in Nomenclature (LPSN) and National Center for Biotechnology Information (NCBI).

16S rRNA based LTP_10_2024

- Allokutzneria
  - A. multivorans Cao et al. 2013
  - - A. albata (Tomita et al. 1993) Labeda and Kroppenstedt 2008
    - A. oryzae Duangmal et al. 2014

120 marker proteins based GTDB 10-RS226

- Allokutzneria
  - A. albata
  - A. multivorans

== See also ==
- List of bacterial orders
- List of bacteria genera
