= Tenuibacillus halotolerans =

Scientific classification
- Domain: Bacteria
- Kingdom: Bacillati
- Phylum: Bacillota
- Class: Bacilli
- Order: Bacillales
- Family: Alkalibacillaceae
- Genus: Tenuibacillus
- Species: T. halotolerans

Binomial name
- Tenuibacillus halotolerans Gao et al. 2021

Type strain
- YIM 94025

Species of bacterium

Tenuibacillus halotolerans is a Gram-positive, moderately halotolerant and rod-shaped bacterium from the genus of Tenuibacillus which has been isolated from soil from a salt lake from the Xinjiang Province.
