= Winogradskyella endarachnes =

Scientific classification
- Domain: Bacteria
- Kingdom: Pseudomonadati
- Phylum: Bacteroidota
- Class: Flavobacteriia
- Order: Flavobacteriales
- Family: Flavobacteriaceae
- Genus: Winogradskyella
- Species: W. endarachnes

Binomial name
- Winogradskyella endarachnes Xu et al. 2020

Type strain
- HL2-2

Species of bacterium

Winogradskyella endarachnes is a Gram-negative, aerobic, rod-shaped and motile bacterium from the genus Winogradskyella which has been isolated from the alga Endarachne binghamiae.
