= Bounagaea =

Scientific classification
- Domain: Bacteria
- Kingdom: Bacillati
- Phylum: Actinomycetota
- Class: Actinomycetes
- Order: Pseudonocardiales
- Family: Pseudonocardiaceae
- Genus: Bounagaea; Meklat et al. 2015
- Species: B. algeriensis

Binomial name
- Bounagaea algeriensis Meklat et al. 2015

Type strain
- CECT 8470; DSM 45966; H8

Genus of bacteria

Bounagaea algeriensis is a halophilic species of bacteria from the family Pseudonocardiaceae. Bounagaea algeriensis has been isolated from saharan soil from El Goléa.

== See also ==
- List of bacterial orders
- List of bacteria genera
