= Winogradskyella tangerina =

Scientific classification
- Domain: Bacteria
- Kingdom: Pseudomonadati
- Phylum: Bacteroidota
- Class: Flavobacteriia
- Order: Flavobacteriales
- Family: Flavobacteriaceae
- Genus: Winogradskyella
- Species: W. tangerina

Binomial name
- Winogradskyella tangerina Wang et al. 2018

Type strain
- M1309

Synonyms
- Winogradskyella tangerinus

Species of bacterium

Winogradskyella tangerina is a Gram-negative and rod-shaped bacterium from the genus Winogradskyella which has been isolated from sediments from the coast of Weihai.
