= Actinoalloteichus =

Scientific classification
- Domain: Bacteria
- Kingdom: Bacillati
- Phylum: Actinomycetota
- Class: Actinomycetes
- Order: Pseudonocardiales
- Family: Pseudonocardiaceae
- Genus: Actinoalloteichus; Tamura et al. 2000

Type species
- Actinoalloteichus cyanogriseus Tamura et al. 2000

Species
- "A. alkalophilus"; A. caeruleus; "A. fjordicus"; A. hoggarensis; A. hymeniacidonis; A. nanshanensis; A. spitiensis

Genus of bacteria

Actinoalloteichus is a genus in the phylum Actinomycetota (Bacteria).

== Etymology ==
The name Actinoalloteichus derives from the Greek noun actis or actinos, ray (used to refer to actinomycetes); Greek adjective allos, another, the other; Greek masculine gender noun teichos, wall; Neo-Latin masculine gender noun Actinoalloteichus, actinomycete with a different wall.

- A. hymeniacidonis Zhang et al. 2006 (Neo-Latin genitive case noun hymeniacidonis, of Hymeniacidon, the generic name of the marine sponge Hymeniacidon perleve, the source of the type strain.)
- A. nanshanensis Xiang et al. 2011 (Neo-Latin masculine gender adjective nanshanensis, of or pertaining to the Nanshan Temple in Guangxi Province in south China, from where the sample was collected.)
- A. spitiensis Singla et al. 2005 (Neo-Latin masculine gender adjective spitiensis, pertaining to Spiti Valley, located in the Indian Himalayas, where the type strain was isolated.)

== Phylogeny ==
The currently accepted taxonomy is based on the List of Prokaryotic names with Standing in Nomenclature (LPSN) and National Center for Biotechnology Information (NCBI).

16S rRNA based LTP_10_2024

- Actinoalloteichus
  - - A. caeruleus (Baldacci 1944) Teo et al. 2021
    - A. spitiensis Singla et al. 2005
  - - A. nanshanensis Xiang et al. 2011
    - - A. hoggarensis Boudjelal et al. 2015
      - A. hymeniacidonis Zhang et al. 2006

120 marker proteins based GTDB 10-RS226

- Actinoalloteichus
  - - A. caeruleus
    - A. spitiensis
  - - A. hymeniacidonis
    - - "A. fjordicus" Nouioui et al. 2017
      - A. hoggarensis

== See also ==
- Bacterial taxonomy
- List of bacterial orders
- List of bacteria genera
- Microbiology
