= Winogradskyella litorisediminis =

Scientific classification
- Domain: Bacteria
- Kingdom: Pseudomonadati
- Phylum: Bacteroidota
- Class: Flavobacteriia
- Order: Flavobacteriales
- Family: Flavobacteriaceae
- Genus: Winogradskyella
- Species: W. litorisediminis

Binomial name
- Winogradskyella litorisediminis Kang et al. 2013

Type strain
- DPS-8

Species of bacterium

Winogradskyella litorisediminis is a Gram-negative, aerobic and rod-shaped bacterium from the genus Winogradskyella which has been isolated from sediments from the coast of Geojedo.
