= Winogradskyella echinorum =

Scientific classification
- Domain: Bacteria
- Kingdom: Pseudomonadati
- Phylum: Bacteroidota
- Class: Flavobacteriia
- Order: Flavobacteriales
- Family: Flavobacteriaceae
- Genus: Winogradskyella
- Species: W. echinorum

Binomial name
- Winogradskyella echinorum Nedashkovskaya et al. 2009

Type strain
- KMM 6211

Species of bacterium

Winogradskyella echinorum is a bacterium from the genus Winogradskyella which has been isolated from the sea urchin Strongylocentrotus intermedius.
