= Actinomycetospora =

Scientific classification
- Domain: Bacteria
- Kingdom: Bacillati
- Phylum: Actinomycetota
- Class: Actinomycetes
- Order: Pseudonocardiales
- Family: Pseudonocardiaceae
- Genus: Actinomycetospora; Jiang et al. 2008

Type species
- Actinomycetospora chiangmaiensis Jiang et al. 2008

Species
- See text

Genus of bacteria

Actinomycetospora is a genus in the phylum Actinomycetota (Bacteria).

== Etymology ==
The name Actinomycetospora derives from:
Neo-Latin noun actinomyces -etis (from Greek noun aktis, aktinos (ἀκτίς, ἀκτῖνος), a beam and Greek noun mukēs -ētos, mushroom or other fungus), an actinomycete; Greek feminine gender noun spora (σπορά), a seed and, in biology, a spore; Neo-Latin feminine gender noun Actinomycetospora, referring to an actinomycete with spore chains.

== Phylogeny ==
The currently accepted taxonomy is based on the List of Prokaryotic names with Standing in Nomenclature (LPSN) and National Center for Biotechnology Information (NCBI).

16S rRNA based LTP_10_2024

- Actinomycetospora
  - - - A. endophytica
      - - A. chiangmaiensis
        - A. soli
    - - A. iriomotensis Yamamura et al. 2011
      - - A. corticicola
        - - A. atypica Zhang et al. 2014
          - A. rishiriensis Yamamura et al. 2011
  - - - A. lutea
      - A. rhizophila He et al. 2015
    - - A. succinea
      - - - A. callitridis
          - A. chlora
        - - A. cinnamomea
          - - A. chibensis
            - A. straminea

120 marker proteins based GTDB 10-RS226

- Actinomycetospora
  - - A. endophytica Sakdapetsiri et al. 2018
    - - - A. aurantiaca Suriyachadkun et al. 2024
        - A. termitidis Supong et al. 2025
      - - A. soli Chantavorakit and Duangmal 2022
        - - A. chiangmaiensis Jiang et al. 2008
          - A. corticicola Tamura et al. 2011
  - - - A. callitridis Kaewkla and Franco 2019
      - A. chibensis Tamura et al. 2011
    - - A. cinnamomea Tamura et al. 2011
      - - A. chlora Tamura et al. 2011
        - - - "A. lemnae" Saimee et al. 2024
            - A. straminea Tamura et al. 2011
          - - A. aeridis Suriyachadkun et al. 2024
            - - A. lutea Tamura et al. 2011
              - - A. flava Suriyachadkun et al. 2024
                - A. succinea Tamura et al. 2011

== See also ==
- Bacterial taxonomy
- List of bacterial orders
- List of bacteria genera
- Microbiology
