= Winogradskyella pocilloporae =

Scientific classification
- Domain: Bacteria
- Kingdom: Pseudomonadati
- Phylum: Bacteroidota
- Class: Flavobacteriia
- Order: Flavobacteriales
- Family: Flavobacteriaceae
- Genus: Winogradskyella
- Species: W. pocilloporae

Binomial name
- Winogradskyella pocilloporae Franco et al. 2018

Type strain
- AFPH31

Species of bacterium

Winogradskyella pocilloporae is a Gram-negative, strictly aerobic and rod-shaped bacterium from the genus Winogradskyella which has been isolated from the coral Pocillopora damicornis.
