= Actinokineospora =

Scientific classification
- Domain: Bacteria
- Kingdom: Bacillati
- Phylum: Actinomycetota
- Class: Actinomycetes
- Order: Pseudonocardiales
- Family: Pseudonocardiaceae
- Genus: Actinokineospora; Hasegawa 1988

Type species
- Actinokineospora riparia Hasegawa 1988

Species
- See text

Synonyms
- Alloactinosynnema Yuan et al. 2010

Genus of bacteria

Actinokineospora is a genus in the phylum Actinomycetota (Bacteria).

== Etymology ==
The name Actinokineospora derives from: Greek noun aktis, aktinos (ἀκτίς, ἀκτῖνος), a beam, ray; Greek v. kineo, to set in motion; Greek feminine gender noun spora (σπορά), seed and in biology a spore; Neo-Latin feminine gender noun Actinokineospora, actinomycete bearing zoospores.

- A. auranticolor (Otoguro et al. 2003; Neo-Latin noun Aurantium)
- A. baliensis (Lisdiyanti et al. 2010; Neo-Latin feminine gender adjective baliensis, pertaining to Bali, Indonesia, from where the type strain was isolated.)
- A. cianjurensis (Lisdiyanti et al. 2010; Neo-Latin feminine gender adjective cianjurensis, pertaining to Cianjur, West Java, Indonesia, from where the first strains were isolated.)
- A. cibodasensis (Lisdiyanti et al. 2010; Neo-Latin feminine gender adjective cibodasensis, pertaining to Cibodas, West Java, Indonesia, from where the first strains were isolated.)
- A. diospyrosa (Tamura et al. 1995; Neo-Latin feminine gender adjective)
- A. enzanensis (Otoguro et al. 2003; Neo-Latin feminine gender adjective)
- A. fastidiosa ((Henssen et al. 1987) Labeda et al. 2010; Latin feminine gender adjective fastidiosa, disdainful, fastidious.), formerly Amycolatopsis fastidiosa and before that Pseudonocardia fastidiosa
- A. globicatena (Tamura et al. 1995; Latin noun globus)
- A. inagensis (Tamura et al. 1995; Neo-Latin feminine gender adjective)
- A. riparia (Hasegawa 1988, (Type species of the genus); Latin feminine gender adjective)
- A. terrae (Tamura et al. 1995; Latin genitive case noun terrae)

== Phylogeny ==
The currently accepted taxonomy is based on the List of Prokaryotic names with Standing in Nomenclature (LPSN) and National Center for Biotechnology Information (NCBI).

16S rRNA based LTP_10_2024

- Actinokineospora
  - - A. alba (Yuan et al. 2010) Nouioui et al. 2018
    - A. iranica (Nikou et al. 2014) Nouioui et al. 2018
  - - - A. fastidiosa (Henssen et al. 1987) Labeda et al. 2010
      - - A. acnipugnans Darhal, Shim & Kim 2017
        - - A. guangxiensis Wu and Liu 2015
          - A. soli Tang et al. 2012
    - - A. cibodasensis (Lisdiyanti et al. 2010
      - - - A. pegani Lei et al. 2020
          - - A. mzabensis Aouiche et al. 2015
            - A. spheciospongiaeKämpfer et al. 2015
        - - - - A. inagensis Tamura et al. 1995
              - A. riparia Hasegawa 1988
            - - A. bangkokensis Intra et al. 2013
              - A. enzanensis Otoguro et al. 2003
          - - A. auranticolor Otoguro et al. 2003
            - - A. diospyrosa Tamura et al. 1995
              - - A. baliensis Lisdiyanti et al. 2010
                - - A. cianjurensis Lisdiyanti et al. 2010
                  - - A. globicatena Tamura et al. 1995
                    - A. terrae Tamura et al. 1995

120 marker proteins based GTDB 10-RS226

- Actinokineospora
  - - A. fastidiosa
    - A. soli
  - - - A. alba
      - A. xionganensis Wang et al. 2026
    - - - A. spheciospongiae
        - - A. bangkokensis
          - A. pegani
      - - A. iranica
        - - - A. auranticolor
            - A. enzanensis
          - - A. inagensis
            - - - A. baliensis
                - A. diospyrosa
              - - A. globicatena
                - A. terrae [incl. A. cianjurensis]

== See also ==
- Bacterial taxonomy
- List of bacterial orders
- List of bacteria genera
- Microbiology
