= Winogradskyella wandonensis =

Scientific classification
- Domain: Bacteria
- Kingdom: Pseudomonadati
- Phylum: Bacteroidota
- Class: Flavobacteriia
- Order: Flavobacteriales
- Family: Flavobacteriaceae
- Genus: Winogradskyella
- Species: W. wandonensis

Binomial name
- Winogradskyella wandonensis Park et al. 2014

Type strain
- WD-2-2

Species of bacterium

Winogradskyella wandonensis is a Gram-negative, non-flagellated, non-gliding, aerobic and rod-shaped bacterium from the genus Winogradskyella which has been isolated from tidal flat from Wando from Korea

== Habitat and Isolation ==
The bacterium thrives in marine environments and was discovered in a tidal flat ecosystem. The type strain is WD-2-2, available in culture collections as CECT 8445 and KCTC 32579.

== Genomics and Ecology ==
The species' 16S rRNA gene sequence aids in phylogenetic studies. W. wandonensis plays a role in organic material degradation and nutrient cycling in marine habitats.
