= Winogradskyella sediminis =

Scientific classification
- Domain: Bacteria
- Kingdom: Pseudomonadati
- Phylum: Bacteroidota
- Class: Flavobacteriia
- Order: Flavobacteriales
- Family: Flavobacteriaceae
- Genus: Winogradskyella
- Species: W. sediminis

Binomial name
- Winogradskyella sediminis Zhang et al. 2016

Type strain
- S5-23-3

Species of bacterium

Winogradskyella sediminis is a Gram-negative and rod-shaped bacterium from the genus Winogradskyella which has been isolated from sediments from the Yellow Sea.
