= Winogradskyella poriferorum =

Scientific classification
- Domain: Bacteria
- Kingdom: Pseudomonadati
- Phylum: Bacteroidota
- Class: Flavobacteriia
- Order: Flavobacteriales
- Family: Flavobacteriaceae
- Genus: Winogradskyella
- Species: W. poriferorum

Binomial name
- Winogradskyella poriferorum Lau et al. 2005

Type strain
- UST030701-295

Synonyms
- Winogradskyella poriferia

Species of bacterium

Winogradskyella poriferorum is a Gram-negative and rod-shaped bacterium from the genus Winogradskyella which has been isolated from the surface of the sponge Lissodendoryx isodictyalis from the Bahamas.
