= Winogradskyella algicola =

Scientific classification
- Domain: Bacteria
- Kingdom: Pseudomonadati
- Phylum: Bacteroidota
- Class: Flavobacteriia
- Order: Flavobacteriales
- Family: Flavobacteriaceae
- Genus: Winogradskyella
- Species: W. algicola

Binomial name
- Winogradskyella algicola Song et al. 2020

Type strain
- IMCC33238

Species of bacterium

Winogradskyella algicola is a bacterium from the genus Winogradskyella which occur in the alga Dunaliella tertiolecta.
