= Actinosynnema =

Scientific classification
- Domain: Bacteria
- Kingdom: Bacillati
- Phylum: Actinomycetota
- Class: Actinomycetes
- Order: Pseudonocardiales
- Family: Pseudonocardiaceae
- Genus: Actinosynnema; Hasegawa et al. 1978 (Approved Lists 1980)

Type species
- Actinosynnema mirum Hasegawa, Lechevalier & Lechevalier 1978 (Approved Lists 1980)

Species
- A. mirum; A. pretiosum

Genus of bacteria

Actinosynnema is a genus in the phylum Actinomycetota (Bacteria).

== Etymology ==
The name Actinosynnema derives from:
Greek noun aktis, aktinos (ἀκτίς, ἀκτῖνος), beam =actinomycete-like bacterium; Greek prep. syn, in company with, together with; Greek noun nema, thread; N.Greek noun synnema, threads wrapping together, synnema; Neo-Latin neuter gender noun Actinosynnema, indicates a synnema-forming actinomycete.

- A. mirum Hasegawa et al. 1978 (Approved Lists 1980) (Latin neuter gender adjective mirum, marvellous, wonderful.)
- A. pretiosum Hasegawa et al. 1983 (Latin neuter gender adjective pretiosum, precious.)

== Phylogeny ==
The currently accepted taxonomy is based on the List of Prokaryotic names with Standing in Nomenclature (LPSN) and National Center for Biotechnology Information (NCBI).

16S rRNA based LTP_10_2024

- Actinosynnema
  - A. pretiosum Hasegawa et al. 1983
  - - A. pretiosum auranticum Hasegawa et al. 1983
    - A. mirum Hasegawa, Lechevalier & Lechevalier 1978

120 marker proteins based GTDB 10-RS226

- Actinosynnema
  - A. pretiosum
  - - A. pretiosum auranticum
    - A. mirum

== See also ==
- Bacterial taxonomy
- List of bacterial orders
- List of bacteria genera
- Microbiology
