= Winogradskyella algae =

Scientific classification
- Domain: Bacteria
- Kingdom: Pseudomonadati
- Phylum: Bacteroidota
- Class: Flavobacteriia
- Order: Flavobacteriales
- Family: Flavobacteriaceae
- Genus: Winogradskyella
- Species: W. algae

Binomial name
- Winogradskyella algae Kurilenko et al. 2019

Type strain
- Kr9-9

Species of bacterium

Winogradskyella algae is a Gram-negative, aerobic, rod-shaped and non-motile bacterium from the genus of Winogradskyella which has been isolated from a brown alga near the Kuril Islands.
