= Winogradskyella haliclonae =

Scientific classification
- Domain: Bacteria
- Kingdom: Pseudomonadati
- Phylum: Bacteroidota
- Class: Flavobacteriia
- Order: Flavobacteriales
- Family: Flavobacteriaceae
- Genus: Winogradskyella
- Species: W. haliclonae

Binomial name
- Winogradskyella haliclonae Schellenberg et al. 2017

Type strain
- M1A16

Species of bacterium

Winogradskyella haliclonae is a Gram-negative, rod-shaped and motile bacterium from the genus Winogradskyella which has been isolated from the sponge Haliclona.
