= Actinocrispum wychmicini =

Scientific classification
- Domain: Bacteria
- Kingdom: Bacillati
- Phylum: Actinomycetota
- Class: Actinomycetia
- Order: Pseudonocardiales
- Family: Pseudonocardiaceae
- Genus: Actinocrispum; Hatano et al. 2016
- Species: A. wychmicini

Binomial name
- Actinocrispum wychmicini Hatano et al. 2016

Type strain
- DSM 45934; MI503-A4; NBRC 109632

Species of bacterium

Actinocrispum wychmicini is a bacterium from the genus Actinocrispum which has been isolated from soil from Kuroishi, Japan.
