= Winogradskyella maritima =

Scientific classification
- Domain: Bacteria
- Kingdom: Pseudomonadati
- Phylum: Bacteroidota
- Class: Flavobacteriia
- Order: Flavobacteriales
- Family: Flavobacteriaceae
- Genus: Winogradskyella
- Species: W. maritima

Binomial name
- Winogradskyella maritima Kang et al. 2017

Type strain
- HME9613

Species of bacterium

Winogradskyella maritima is a Gram-negative, aerobic, rod-shaped and motile bacterium from the genus Winogradskyella which has been isolated from seawater from the Yellow Sea.
