= Winogradskyella exilis =

Scientific classification
- Domain: Bacteria
- Kingdom: Pseudomonadati
- Phylum: Bacteroidota
- Class: Flavobacteriia
- Order: Flavobacteriales
- Family: Flavobacteriaceae
- Genus: Winogradskyella
- Species: W. exilis

Binomial name
- Winogradskyella exilis Ivanova et al. 2010

Type strain
- 022-2-26

Synonyms
- Winogradskyella exila

Species of bacterium

Winogradskyella exilis is a Gram-negative, chemoorganotrophic, alkalitolerant and mesophilic bacterium from the genus Winogradskyella which has been isolated from the starfish Stellaster equestris.
