= Winogradskyella psychrotolerans =

Scientific classification
- Domain: Bacteria
- Kingdom: Pseudomonadati
- Phylum: Bacteroidota
- Class: Flavobacteriia
- Order: Flavobacteriales
- Family: Flavobacteriaceae
- Genus: Winogradskyella
- Species: W. psychrotolerans

Binomial name
- Winogradskyella psychrotolerans Begum et al. 2013

Type strain
- RS-3

Species of bacterium

Winogradskyella psychrotolerans is a Gram-negative and rod-coccus shaped bacterium from the genus Winogradskyella which has been isolated from sediments from Kongsfjorden.
