= Winogradskyella litoriviva =

Scientific classification
- Domain: Bacteria
- Kingdom: Pseudomonadati
- Phylum: Bacteroidota
- Class: Flavobacteriia
- Order: Flavobacteriales
- Family: Flavobacteriaceae
- Genus: Winogradskyella
- Species: W. litoriviva

Binomial name
- Winogradskyella litoriviva Nedashkovskaya et al. 2015

Type strain
- 6491

Species of bacterium

Winogradskyella litoriviva is a Gram-negative, facultatively anaerobic and moderately halophilic bacterium from the genus Winogradskyella which has been isolated from seawater from the coast of Troitsa Bay.
