= Winogradskyella undariae =

Scientific classification
- Domain: Bacteria
- Kingdom: Pseudomonadati
- Phylum: Bacteroidota
- Class: Flavobacteriia
- Order: Flavobacteriales
- Family: Flavobacteriaceae
- Genus: Winogradskyella
- Species: W. undariae

Binomial name
- Winogradskyella undariae Park and Yoon 2014

Type strain
- WS-MY5

Species of bacterium

Winogradskyella undariae is a bacterium from the genus Winogradskyella which has been isolated from the algae Undaria pinnatifida from Wando.
