= Winogradskyella =

Scientific classification
- Domain: Bacteria
- Kingdom: Pseudomonadati
- Phylum: Bacteroidota
- Class: Flavobacteriia
- Order: Flavobacteriales
- Family: Flavobacteriaceae
- Genus: Winogradskyella; Nedashkovskaya et al. 2005

Species
- See text

Bacterium

Winogradskyella is a genus of bacteria from the family Flavobacteriaceae. Winogradskyella is named after the Russian microbiologist Sergei Winogradsky.

== Species ==
The genus Winogradskyella comprises the following species:

W. algae
W. algicola
W. aquimaris
W. arenosi
Ca. W. atlantica
W. aurantia
W. aurantiaca
W. costae
W. crassostreae
W. damuponensis
W. echinorum
W. eckloniae
W. endarachnes
W. epiphytica
W. exilis
W. eximia
W. flava
W. forsetii
W. haliclonae
W. helgolandensis
W. jejuensis
W. litorisediminis
W. litoriviva
W. ludwigii
W. lutea
W. maritima
W. multivorans
W. pacifica
W. pocilloporae
W. poriferorum
W. profunda
W. psychrotolerans
W. pulchriflava
W. rapida
W. schleiferi
W. sediminis
W. tangerina
W. thalassocola
W. ulvae
W. undariae
W. ursingii
W. vidalii
W. wandonensis
W. wichelsiae
