= Winogradskyella aurantiaca =

Scientific classification
- Domain: Bacteria
- Kingdom: Pseudomonadati
- Phylum: Bacteroidota
- Class: Flavobacteriia
- Order: Flavobacteriales
- Family: Flavobacteriaceae
- Genus: Winogradskyella
- Species: W. aurantiaca

Binomial name
- Winogradskyella aurantiaca Song et al. 2018

Type strain
- IMCC20180

Species of bacterium

Winogradskyella aurantiaca is a Gram-negative and motile bacterium from the genus Winogradskyella which has been isolated from seawater from the coast of the Sea of Japan in Korea.
