= Halosaccharopolyspora lacisalsi =

Scientific classification
- Domain: Bacteria
- Kingdom: Bacillati
- Phylum: Actinomycetota
- Class: Actinomycetia
- Order: Pseudonocardiales
- Family: Pseudonocardiaceae
- Genus: Halosaccharopolyspora; Teo et al. 2021
- Species: H. lacisalsi

Binomial name
- Halosaccharopolyspora lacisalsi (Guan et al. 2013) Teo et al. 2021

Type strain
- CCTCC AA 2010012; DSM 45975; KCTC 19987; TRM 40133

Synonyms
- Saccharopolyspora lacisalsi Guan et al. 2013

Species of bacterium

Halosaccharopolyspora lacisalsi is a halophilic bacterium from the family Pseudonocardiaceae which has been isolated from the salt lake Lop Nur in Xinjiang, China.
