= Winogradskyella epiphytica =

Scientific classification
- Domain: Bacteria
- Kingdom: Pseudomonadati
- Phylum: Bacteroidota
- Class: Flavobacteriia
- Order: Flavobacteriales
- Family: Flavobacteriaceae
- Genus: Winogradskyella
- Species: W. epiphytica

Binomial name
- Winogradskyella epiphytica Nedashkovskaya et al. 2005

Species of bacterium

Winogradskyella epiphytica is a Gram-negative and aerobic bacterium from the genus Winogradskyella which has been isolated from algae.
