= Winogradskyella lutea =

Scientific classification
- Domain: Bacteria
- Kingdom: Pseudomonadati
- Phylum: Bacteroidota
- Class: Flavobacteriia
- Order: Flavobacteriales
- Family: Flavobacteriaceae
- Genus: Winogradskyella
- Species: W. lutea

Binomial name
- Winogradskyella lutea Yoon et al. 2011

Type strain
- A73

Species of bacterium

Winogradskyella lutea is a Gram-negative, strictly aerobic and rod-shaped bacterium from the genus Winogradskyella which has been isolated from seawater from Jeju in Korea.
