= Sabulilitoribacter =

Scientific classification
- Domain: Bacteria
- Kingdom: Pseudomonadati
- Phylum: Bacteroidota
- Class: Flavobacteriia
- Order: Flavobacteriales
- Family: Flavobacteriaceae
- Genus: Sabulilitoribacter; Park et al. 2014

Type species
- Sabulilitoribacter multivorans

Species
- S. arenilitoris S. multivorans

Genus of bacteria

Sabulilitoribacter is a bacteria genus from the family of Flavobacteriaceae.
