= Salinifilum =

Scientific classification
- Domain: Bacteria
- Kingdom: Bacillati
- Phylum: Actinomycetota
- Class: Actinomycetes
- Order: Pseudonocardiales
- Family: Pseudonocardiaceae
- Genus: Salinifilum; Moshtaghi Nikou et al. 2017

Type species
- Salinifilum proteinilyticum Moshtaghi Nikou et al. 2017

Species
- S. aidingense; S. ghardaiense; S. proteinilyticum

Genus of bacteria

Salinifilum is a genus of bacteria within the family Pseudonocardiaceae.

== Phylogeny ==
The currently accepted taxonomy is based on the List of Prokaryotic names with Standing in Nomenclature (LPSN) and National Center for Biotechnology Information (NCBI).

16S rRNA based LTP_10_2024

- Salinifilum
  - S. proteinilyticum Moshtaghi Nikou et al. 2017
  - - S. aidingense corrig. (Xia et al. 2017) Moshtaghi Nikou et al. 2017
    - S. ghardaiense corrig. (Meklat et al. 2014) Moshtaghi Nikou et al. 2017

== See also ==
- List of bacterial orders
- List of bacteria genera
