= Winogradskyella arenosi =

Scientific classification
- Domain: Bacteria
- Kingdom: Pseudomonadati
- Phylum: Bacteroidota
- Class: Flavobacteriia
- Order: Flavobacteriales
- Family: Flavobacteriaceae
- Genus: Winogradskyella
- Species: W. arenosi

Binomial name
- Winogradskyella arenosi Romanenko et al. 2009

Type strain
- R60

Synonyms
- Winogradskyella arenosa

Species of bacterium

Winogradskyella arenosi is a Gram-negative and aerobic bacterium from the genus Winogradskyella which has been isolated from sediments from the Sea of Japan.
