= Sabulilitoribacter arenilitoris =

Scientific classification
- Domain: Bacteria
- Kingdom: Pseudomonadati
- Phylum: Bacteroidota
- Class: Flavobacteriia
- Order: Flavobacteriales
- Family: Flavobacteriaceae
- Genus: Sabulilitoribacter
- Species: S. arenilitoris

Binomial name
- Sabulilitoribacter arenilitoris Kang et al. 2017

Type strain
- KCTC 52401, NBRC 112674, HMF6543

Species of bacterium

Sabulilitoribacter arenilitoris is a Gram-negative and non-motile bacteria from the genus of Sabulilitoribacter which has been isolated from sand from the South Sea in Korea.
