= Winogradskyella aquimaris =

Scientific classification
- Domain: Bacteria
- Kingdom: Pseudomonadati
- Phylum: Bacteroidota
- Class: Flavobacteriia
- Order: Flavobacteriales
- Family: Flavobacteriaceae
- Genus: Winogradskyella
- Species: W. aquimaris

Binomial name
- Winogradskyella aquimaris Lee et al. 2012

Type strain
- DPG-24

Species of bacterium

Winogradskyella aquimaris is a Gram-negative, aerobic and motile bacterium from the genus Winogradskyella which has been isolated from seawater from the Geoje Island.
