= Labedaea rhizosphaerae =

Scientific classification
- Domain: Bacteria
- Kingdom: Bacillati
- Phylum: Actinomycetota
- Class: Actinomycetia
- Order: Pseudonocardiales
- Family: Pseudonocardiaceae
- Genus: Labedaea; Lee 2012
- Species: L. rhizosphaerae

Binomial name
- Labedaea rhizosphaerae Lee 2012

Type strain
- DSM 45361; KCTC 19662; RS-49

Species of bacterium

Labedaea rhizosphaerae is a bacterium from the family Pseudonocardiaceae which has been isolated from rhizosphere soil from the plant Peucedanum japonicum on Mara Island, Korea.
