= Winogradskyella damuponensis =

Scientific classification
- Domain: Bacteria
- Kingdom: Pseudomonadati
- Phylum: Bacteroidota
- Class: Flavobacteriia
- Order: Flavobacteriales
- Family: Flavobacteriaceae
- Genus: Winogradskyella
- Species: W. damuponensis

Binomial name
- Winogradskyella damuponensis Lee et al. 2013

Type strain
- F081-2

Species of bacterium

Winogradskyella damuponensis is a Gram-negative, strictly aerobic, rod-shaped and motile bacterium from the genus Winogradskyella which has been isolated from seawater from the beach of Damupo in Korea.
