= Herbihabitans rhizosphaerae =

Scientific classification
- Domain: Bacteria
- Kingdom: Bacillati
- Phylum: Actinomycetota
- Class: Actinomycetia
- Order: Pseudonocardiales
- Family: Pseudonocardiaceae
- Genus: Herbihabitans; Zhang et al. 2016
- Species: H. rhizosphaerae

Binomial name
- Herbihabitans rhizosphaerae Zhang et al. 2016

Type strain
- CPCC 204279; DSM 101727; NBRC 111774

Species of bacterium

Herbihabitans rhizosphaerae is a bacterium from the genus Herbihabitans which has been isolated from rhizosphere soil from the plant Limonium sinense in Xinjiang, China.
