= Winogradskyella pulchriflava =

Scientific classification
- Domain: Bacteria
- Kingdom: Pseudomonadati
- Phylum: Bacteroidota
- Class: Flavobacteriia
- Order: Flavobacteriales
- Family: Flavobacteriaceae
- Genus: Winogradskyella
- Species: W. pulchriflava

Binomial name
- Winogradskyella pulchriflava Kim et al. 2013

Type strain
- EM106

Species of bacterium

Winogradskyella pulchriflava is a bacterium from the genus Winogradskyella which has been isolated from sediments from the Sea of Japan in Korea.
