= Actinorectispora =

Scientific classification
- Domain: Bacteria
- Kingdom: Bacillati
- Phylum: Actinomycetota
- Class: Actinomycetes
- Order: Pseudonocardiales
- Family: Pseudonocardiaceae
- Genus: Actinorectispora; Quadri et al. 2016

Type species
- Actinorectispora indica Quadri et al. 2016

Species
- A. indica; A. metalli

Genus of bacteria

Actinorectispora is a genus from the family Pseudonocardiaceae.

== Phylogeny ==
The currently accepted taxonomy is based on the List of Prokaryotic names with Standing in Nomenclature (LPSN) and National Center for Biotechnology Information (NCBI).

16S rRNA based LTP_10_2024

- Actinorectispora
  - A. indica Quadri et al. 2016
  - A. metalli Cao et al. 2018

120 marker proteins based GTDB 10-RS226

- Actinorectispora
  - A. indica
  - A. metalli

== See also ==
- List of bacterial orders
- List of bacteria genera
