= Winogradskyella pacifica =

Scientific classification
- Domain: Bacteria
- Kingdom: Pseudomonadati
- Phylum: Bacteroidota
- Class: Flavobacteriia
- Order: Flavobacteriales
- Family: Flavobacteriaceae
- Genus: Winogradskyella
- Species: W. pacifica

Binomial name
- Winogradskyella pacifica Kim and Nedashkovskaya 2010

Type strain
- KMM 6019

Species of bacterium

Winogradskyella pacifica is a bacterium from the genus Winogradskyella which has been isolated from seawater.
