= Winogradskyella ulvae =

Scientific classification
- Domain: Bacteria
- Kingdom: Pseudomonadati
- Phylum: Bacteroidota
- Class: Flavobacteriia
- Order: Flavobacteriales
- Family: Flavobacteriaceae
- Genus: Winogradskyella
- Species: W. ulvae

Binomial name
- Winogradskyella ulvae Nedashkovskaya et al. 2012

Type strain
- 6390

Species of bacterium

Winogradskyella ulvae is a Gram-negative, facultatively anaerobic, slightly halophilic and motile bacterium from the genus Winogradskyella which has been isolated from the alga Ulva fenestrata.
