= Longimycelium tulufanense =

Scientific classification
- Domain: Bacteria
- Kingdom: Bacillati
- Phylum: Actinomycetota
- Class: Actinomycetes
- Order: Pseudonocardiales
- Family: Pseudonocardiaceae
- Genus: Longimycelium; Xia et al. 2013
- Species: L. tulufanense

Binomial name
- Longimycelium tulufanense Xia et al. 2013

Type strain
- CGMCC 4.5737; NBRC 107726; TRM 46004

Species of bacterium

Longimycelium tulufanense is a bacterium from the family Pseudonocardiaceae which has been isolated from sediments from Aiding Lake in China.
