= Winogradskyella aurantia =

Scientific classification
- Domain: Bacteria
- Kingdom: Pseudomonadati
- Phylum: Bacteroidota
- Class: Flavobacteriia
- Order: Flavobacteriales
- Family: Flavobacteriaceae
- Genus: Winogradskyella
- Species: W. aurantia

Binomial name
- Winogradskyella aurantia Sun et al. 2018

Type strain
- WNB302

Species of bacterium

Winogradskyella aurantia is a Gram-negative, slightly halophilic and facultatively anaerobic bacterium from the genus Winogradskyella which has been isolated from a marine solar saltern from Wendeng in China.
