= Winogradskyella eckloniae =

Scientific classification
- Domain: Bacteria
- Kingdom: Pseudomonadati
- Phylum: Bacteroidota
- Class: Flavobacteriia
- Order: Flavobacteriales
- Family: Flavobacteriaceae
- Genus: Winogradskyella
- Species: W. eckloniae

Binomial name
- Winogradskyella eckloniae Kim et al. 2015

Type strain
- EC29

Species of bacterium

Winogradskyella eckloniae is a Gram-negative, aerobic, rod-shaped and motile bacterium from the genus Winogradskyella which has been isolated from the alga Ecklonia cava from the Jeju Island.
