= Actinopolyspora =

Scientific classification
- Domain: Bacteria
- Kingdom: Bacillati
- Phylum: Actinomycetota
- Class: Actinomycetes
- Order: Actinopolysporales
- Family: Actinopolysporaceae
- Genus: Actinopolyspora; Gochnauer et al. 1975 (Approved Lists 1980)

Type species
- Actinopolyspora halophila Gochnauer et al. 1975 (Approved Lists 1980)

Species
- See text

Genus of bacteria

Actinopolyspora is a genus in the phylum Actinomycetota (Bacteria).

== Etymology ==
The name Actinopolyspora means "the many-spored actinomycete" (aktis, aktinos (ἀκτίς, ἀκτῖνος), nominally meaning a beam, but in effect meaning an actinomycete-like bacterium, poly meaning many, spora meaning spores)

== Phylogeny ==
The currently accepted taxonomy is based on the List of Prokaryotic names with Standing in Nomenclature (LPSN) and National Center for Biotechnology Information (NCBI).

16S rRNA based LTP_10_2024

- Actinopolyspora
  - - A. mortivallis Yoshida et al. 1991
    - - A. biskrensis Saker et al. 2015
      - - A. halophila Gochnauer et al. 1975
        - - A. algeriensis Meklat et al. 2013
          - A. saharensis Meklat et al. 2013
  - - - A. erythraea Tang et al. 2011
      - A. xinjiangensis Guan et al. 2011
    - - - A. righensis Meklat et al. 2014
        - A. salinaria Duangmal et al. 2016
      - - A. alba Tang et al. 2011
        - - A. lacussalsi Guan et al. 2013
          - A. mzabensis Meklat et al. 2013

120 marker proteins based GTDB 10-RS226

- Actinopolyspora
  - - A. mortivallis
    - - A. saharensis
      - - A. biskrensis
        - A. halophila
  - - - A. erythraea
      - A. xinjiangensis
    - - A. mzabensis
      - - A. alba
        - A. lacussalsi

Species incertae sedis:

- "A. dayingensis" Guan et al. 2013
- "A. egyptensis" Hozzein & Goodfellow 2011
- "A. indiensis" Kumar et al. 2001a

== See also ==
- Bacterial taxonomy
- List of bacterial orders
- List of bacteria genera
- Microbiology
