= Winogradskyella profunda =

Scientific classification
- Domain: Bacteria
- Kingdom: Pseudomonadati
- Phylum: Bacteroidota
- Class: Flavobacteriia
- Order: Flavobacteriales
- Family: Flavobacteriaceae
- Genus: Winogradskyella
- Species: W. profunda

Binomial name
- Winogradskyella profunda Romanenko et al. 2019

Type strain
- Ch38

Species of bacterium

Winogradskyella profunda is a Gram-negative, aerobic, rod-shaped and non-motile bacterium from the genus Winogradskyella which has been isolated from sediments from the bottom of the Chukchi Sea.
