= Crossiella =

Scientific classification
- Domain: Bacteria
- Kingdom: Bacillati
- Phylum: Actinomycetota
- Class: Actinomycetes
- Order: Pseudonocardiales
- Family: Pseudonocardiaceae
- Genus: Crossiella; Labeda 2001

Type species
- Crossiella cryophila corrig. (Labeda and Lechevalier 1989) Labeda 2001

Species
- C. cryophila; C. equi

Genus of bacteria

Crossiella is a genus in the phylum Actinomycetota (Bacteria).

== Etymology ==
The name Crossiella derives from: Neo-Latin named for Thomas Cross, a microbiologist at the University of Bradford, who made many contributions to actinomycete biology and systematics.

- C. cryophila ( (Labeda and Lechevalier 1989) Labeda 2001, (type species of the genus); Greek kruos, icy cold, frost; Neo-Latin philus from Greek philos (φίλος) meaning friend, loving; Neo-Latin cryophila, cold-loving, referring to the low permissive temperature range for growth.)
- C. equi ( Donahue et al. 2002; Latin equi, of the horse, referring to the source of isolation of this microorganism, equine placentas.)

== Phylogeny ==
The currently accepted taxonomy is based on the List of Prokaryotic names with Standing in Nomenclature (LPSN) and National Center for Biotechnology Information (NCBI).

16S rRNA based LTP_10_2024

- Crossiella
  - C. cryophila (Labeda & Lechevalier 1989) Labeda 2001
  - C. equi Donahue et al. 2002

120 marker proteins based GTDB 10-RS226

- Crossiella
  - C. cryophila
  - C. equi

== See also ==
- Bacterial taxonomy
- List of bacterial orders
- List of bacteria genera
- Microbiology
