= Tenuibacillus multivorans =

Scientific classification
- Domain: Bacteria
- Kingdom: Bacillati
- Phylum: Bacillota
- Class: Bacilli
- Order: Bacillales
- Family: Alkalibacillaceae
- Genus: Tenuibacillus
- Species: T. multivorans

Binomial name
- Tenuibacillus multivorans Ren and Zhou 2005

Type strain
- 28-1

Synonyms
- Tenuebacillus multivorans

Species of bacterium

Tenuibacillus multivorans is a Gram-positive, rod-shaped, moderately halophilic and spore-forming bacterium from the genus of Tenuibacillus which has been isolated from soil from a neutral salt lake in Xinjiang.
