= Goodfellowiella coeruleoviolacea =

Scientific classification
- Domain: Bacteria
- Kingdom: Bacillati
- Phylum: Actinomycetota
- Class: Actinomycetia
- Order: Pseudonocardiales
- Family: Pseudonocardiaceae
- Genus: Goodfellowiella; Labeda et al. 2008
- Species: G. coeruleoviolacea

Binomial name
- Goodfellowiella coeruleoviolacea (Preobrazhenskaya and Terekhova 1987) Labeda et al. 2008

Type strain
- AS 4.1709; CGMCC 4.1709; CIP 109303; DSM 43935; IFO 14988; IMSNU 20127; INA 3564; JCM 9110; KCTC 9390; NBRC 14988; NRRL B-24058; VKM Ac-1083

Synonyms
- Genus: Goodfellowia Labeda and Kroppenstedt 2006; Species: Actinomadura coeruleoviolacea Preobrazhenskaya and Terekhova 1987; Goodfellowia coeruleoviolacea (Preobrazhenskaya and Terekhova 1987) Labeda and Kroppenstedt 2006; Saccharothrix coeruleoviolacea (Preobrazhenskaya and Terekhova 1987) Kroppenstedt et al. 1991

Species of bacterium

Goodfellowiella coeruleoviolacea is a bacterium from the family Pseudonocardiaceae which has been isolated from soil in Russia.
