= Winogradskyella multivorans =

Scientific classification
- Domain: Bacteria
- Kingdom: Pseudomonadati
- Phylum: Bacteroidota
- Class: Flavobacteriia
- Order: Flavobacteriales
- Family: Flavobacteriaceae
- Genus: Winogradskyella
- Species: W. multivorans

Binomial name
- Winogradskyella multivorans Yoon and Lee 2012

Type strain
- T-Y1

Species of bacterium

Winogradskyella multivorans is a Gram-negative, aerobic, rod-shaped and motile bacterium from the genus Winogradskyella which has been isolated from seawater from an oyster farm in Korea. Winogradskyella multivorans has the ability to degrade polysaccharides.
