= Kibdelosporangium =

Scientific classification
- Domain: Bacteria
- Kingdom: Bacillati
- Phylum: Actinomycetota
- Class: Actinomycetes
- Order: Pseudonocardiales
- Family: Pseudonocardiaceae
- Genus: Kibdelosporangium; Shearer et al. 1986

Type species
- Kibdelosporangium aridum Shearer et al. 1986

Species
- K. aridum; K. banguiense; K. kanagawaense; K. lantanae; K. metalli; K. persicum; K. philippinense; K. phytohabitans; K. rhizosphaerae; K. rhizovicinum

Genus of bacteria

Kibdelosporangium is a Gram-positive genus from the family Pseudonocardiaceae. Kibdelosporangium bacteria produce substances with antibacterial, anticancer, and antiviral activities.

== Phylogeny ==
The currently accepted taxonomy is based on the List of Prokaryotic names with Standing in Nomenclature (LPSN) and National Center for Biotechnology Information (NCBI).

16S rRNA based LTP_10_2024

- Kibdelosporangium
  - - K. phytohabitans Xing et al. 2012
    - - K. metalli Cao et al. 2017
      - - K. philippinense Mertz and Yao 1988
        - - K. persicum Safaei et al. 2021
          - K. aridum Shearer et al. 1986
  - - K. banguiense Pascual et al. 2016
    - - K. lantanae Li et al. 2015
      - - Actinocrispum wychmicini Hatano et al. 2016
        - - K. kanagawaense Mingma et al. 2017
          - - K. rhizosphaerae Mingma et al. 2017
            - K. rhizovicinum Mingma et al. 2017

120 marker proteins based GTDB 10-RS226

- Kibdelosporangium
  - K. banguiense
  - - K. phytohabitans
    - - K. persicum
      - - K. aridum
        - K. philippinense

== See also ==
- List of bacterial orders
- List of bacteria genera
