= Kutzneria =

Scientific classification
- Domain: Bacteria
- Kingdom: Bacillati
- Phylum: Actinomycetota
- Class: Actinomycetes
- Order: Pseudonocardiales
- Family: Pseudonocardiaceae
- Genus: Kutzneria; Stackebrandt et al. 1994

Type species
- Kutzneria viridogrisea (Furumai et al. 1968) Stackebrandt et al. 1994

Species
- K. albida; K. buriramensis; K. chonburiensis; K. kofuensis; K. viridogrisea

Genus of bacteria

Kutzneria is a genus of bacteria in the phylum Actinomycetota. This genus was named after Hans-Jürgen Kutzner, a German microbiologist.

== Morphology & Biology ==
Kutzneria are non-motile, aerobic, mesophilic, thermotolerant, Gram positive, chemo-organotrophs. They have stable, branched, cottony aerial mycelium. Their cell walls contain N-acetylated muramic acid and meso-diaminopimelic acid. They produce spores which are either cocci, bacilli or oval. They are long sporangiophores measuring up to 50 micrometres which are formed by septation of coiled, unbranched hyphae within the sporangiophores.

== Species ==
Some of the species are:

- Kutzneria albida; first described by Furumai, Ogawa, and Okuda in 1968,
- Kutzneria kofuensis; first described by Nonomura and Ohara 1969 (named after Kofu, a district in Japan, where the organism was isolated),
- Kutzneria viridogrisea; first described by Okuda, Furumai, Watanabe, Okugawa, and Kimura in 1966.

These species were previously classified under the family Streptosporangiaceae (suborder Streptosporangineae) and were known as Streptosporangium albidum, Streptosporangium viridogriseum (subspecies kofuense), and Streptosporangium viridogriseum, respectively.

== Phylogeny ==
The currently accepted taxonomy is based on the List of Prokaryotic names with Standing in Nomenclature (LPSN) and National Center for Biotechnology Information (NCBI).

16S rRNA based LTP_10_2024

- Kutzneria
  - - K. albida (Furumai et al. 1968) Stackebrandt et al. 1994
    - K. viridogrisea (Okuda et al. 1966) Stackebrandt et al. 1994
  - - K. buriramensis Suriyachadkun et al. 2013
    - - K. chonburiensis Chanama et al. 2015
      - K. kofuensis (Nonomura and Ohara 1969) Stackebrandt et al. 1994

120 marker proteins based GTDB 10-RS226

- Kutzneria
  - K. viridogrisea [incl. K. albida]
  - - K. buriramensis
    - - K. chonburiensis
      - K. kofuensis

== See also ==
- List of bacterial orders
- List of bacteria genera
