= Sabulilitoribacter multivorans =

Scientific classification
- Domain: Bacteria
- Kingdom: Pseudomonadati
- Phylum: Bacteroidota
- Class: Flavobacteriia
- Order: Flavobacteriales
- Family: Flavobacteriaceae
- Genus: Sabulilitoribacter
- Species: S. multivorans

Binomial name
- Sabulilitoribacter multivorans Park et al. 2014

Type strain
- CCUG 63831, KCTC 32326, strain M-M16

Species of bacterium

Sabulilitoribacter multivorans is a Gram-negative, aerobic and rod-shaped bacteria from the genus of Sabulilitoribacter which has been isolated from sand from the South Sea in Korea.
