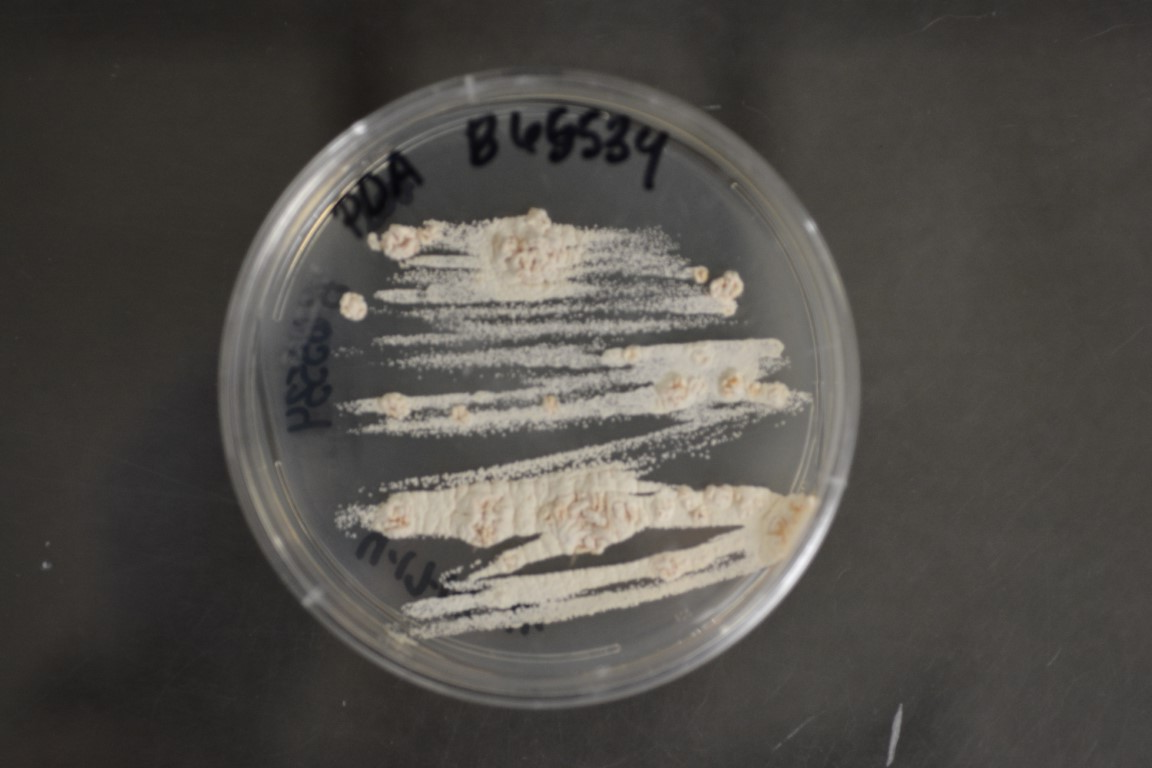
- Pseudonocardia pini on agar plate

Scientific classification
- Domain: Bacteria
- Kingdom: Bacillati
- Phylum: Actinomycetota
- Class: Actinomycetes
- Order: Pseudonocardiales; Labeda and Goodfellow 2015
- Family: Pseudonocardiaceae; Embley et al. 1989

Genera
- See text

Synonyms
- Pseudonocardiales: Actinopolysporineae Zhi et al. 2009; Actinopolysporales Goodfellow and Trujillo 2015; Pseudonocardineae Stackebrandt et al. 1997; Pseudonocardiaceae: Actinopolysporaceae Zhi et al. 2009; Actinosynnemataceae Labeda and Kroppenstedt 2000; Mzabimycetaceae Saker et al. 2015

= Pseudonocardiaceae =

Family of bacteria

The Pseudonocardiaceae are a family of bacteria in the order Actinomycetales and the only member of the suborder Pseudonocardineae.

== Genomics ==
The species within the family Pseudonocardiaceae form a distinct clade in phylogenetic trees based on concatenated protein sequences. Additionally, Nakamurella multipartite, currently part of the order Frankiales, also formed a clade with the Pseudonocardiaceae species in 100% of the bootstrap replications of the phylogenetic trees. A conserved signature indel has been identified which is found in N. multipartite and all but one of the Pseudonocardiaceae species. This one-amino-acid insertion in UMP kinase serves to both provide a molecular marker for nearly all of the Pseudonocardiaceae and suggests N. multipartite is closely related to this group. Some evidence also suggests the orders Pseudonocardiales and Corynebacteriales are closely related. Several conserved signature indels have been identified which are found in both Pseudonocardiales and Corynebacteriales, including a three-amino-acid insertion in a conserved region of UDP-galactopyranose mutase. This insertion is also present in N. multipartite and Geodermatophilus obscurus, another member of Frankiales. Additionally, five conserved signature proteins have been identified which are found only in the orders Pseudonocardiales and Corynebacteriales. Homologs of the proteins are generally found in N. multipartite and G. obscurus, providing additional evidence of these two species being closely related to the orders Pseudonocardiales and Corynebacteriales.

== Phylogeny ==
The currently accepted taxonomy is based on the List of Prokaryotic names with Standing in Nomenclature (LPSN) and National Center for Biotechnology Information (NCBI).

Whole-genome analysis (Note: Actinocrispum, Actinorectispora, Bounagaea, Crossiella, Gandjariella, Haloactinomyces, Halopolyspora, Halosaccharopolyspora, Herbihabitans, Labedaea, Longimycelium, Salinifilum, Solihabitans, Tamaricihabitans, and Thermotunica are not included in this phylogenetic tree.)

- Pseudonocardiales
  - - Actinomycetospora
    - Pseudonocardia
  - - Sciscionella
    - - - - Actinoalloteichus
          - - Actinopolyspora
            - Saccharopolyspora
        - - Kutzneria
          - - - Allokutzneria
              - Streptoalloteichus
            - - Lentzea
              - - Goodfellowiella
                - - Umezawaea
                  - - Saccharothrix
                    - Actinosynnema
      - - - Kibdelosporangium
          - - Actinophytocola
            - Actinokineospora
        - - - Thermocrispum
            - Haloechinothrix
          - - Amycolatopsis
            - - Prauserella
              - Saccharomonospora

16S rRNA based LTP_10_2024

- Actinopolysporales Actinopolysporaceae
  - Halopolyspora Lai et al. 2014
  - - Bounagaea Meklat et al. 2015
    - Actinopolyspora Gochnauer et al. 1975

- - Jiangellales
  - - - Actinosynnemataceae
        - - - Longimycelium Xia et al. 2013
            - Streptoalloteichus Tomita et al. 1978 ex Tomita et al. 1987
          - - - Actinophytocola Indananda et al. 2010
              - - Labedaea Lee 2012
                - Kibdelosporangium Shearer et al. 1986 [incl. Actinocrispum Hatano et al. 2016]
            - - Thermotunica Wu et al. 2014
              - - Gandjariella Ningsih et al. 2019
                - - - Goodfellowiella Labeda et al. 2008
                    - Actinoalloteichus Tamura et al. 2000
                  - - - Crossiella Labeda 2001
                      - Allokutzneria Labeda and Kroppenstedt 2008
                    - - Kutzneria Stackebrandt et al. 1994
                      - - - Solihabitans Jin et al. 2022
                          - Umezawaea Labeda and Kroppenstedt 2007
                        - - Actinokineospora Hasegawa 1988
                          - - Actinorectispora Quadri et al. 2016
                            - - Lentzea tibetensis
                              - - Saccharothrix Labeda et al. 1984
                                - - Actinosynnema Hasegawa, Lechevalier & Lechevalier 1978
                                  - Lentzea Yassin et al. 1995
        - - Herbihabitans Zhang et al. 2016
          - - - - Haloactinomyces Lai et al. 2017
                - Salinifilum Moshtaghi Nikou et al. 2017
              - - - Halosaccharopolyspora Teo, Tan & Li 2021
                  - - Allosaccharopolyspora Teo, Tan & Li 2021
                    - Saccharopolyspora cavernae
                - Saccharopolyspora Lacey and Goodfellow 1975
            - - - Haloechinothrix Tang et al. 2010
                - - Sciscionella Tian et al. 2009
                  - Thermocrispum Korn-Wendisch et al. 1995
              - - Tamaricihabitans Qin et al. 2015
                - - - Yuhushiella Mao et al. 2011
                    - - Qaidamihabitans Tian et al. 2022
                      - - Prauserella shujinwangii
                        - - Prauserella Kim and Goodfellow 1999
                          - Saccharomonospora Nonomura and Ohara 1971
                  - Amycolatopsis Lechevalier et al. 1986
    - - - Pseudonocardiaceae
          - Actinomycetospora Jiang et al. 2008
          - Pseudonocardia Henssen 1957
      - Mycobacteriales

120 marker proteins based GTDB 10-RS226

- Pseudonocardiales Pseudonocardiaceae
  - - Actinomycetospora
    - Pseudonocardia
  - - - Sciscionella
      - - - - Halosaccharopolyspora
            - Halopolyspora
          - Actinopolyspora
        - Saccharopolyspora
    - - - Gandjariella
        - - Longimycelium
          - Streptoalloteichus
      - - - Actinoalloteichus
          - - Crossiella
            - Allokutzneria
        - - - Kutzneria
            - - Goodfellowiella
              - - Solihabitans
                - - Umezawaea
                  - - Actinosynnema [incl. Saccharothrix]
                    - Lentzea
          - - - - Actinocrispum
                - Kibdelosporangium
              - - - Herbihabitans
                  - Labedaea
                - - Actinophytocola
                  - Actinokineospora
            - - Tamaricihabitans
              - - - Haloechinothrix
                  - - Haloechinothrix_A
                    - Thermocrispum
                - - Yuhushiella
                  - - - Qaidamihabitans
                      - - - Saccharomonospora_A
                          - Prauserella_A
                        - - Prauserella muralis
                          - - Prauserella
                            - Saccharomonospora
                    - Amycolatopsis

Genera incertae sedis:

- "Prauseria" Zhou, Whitehead & Goodfellow 1997
- "Saccharothrixopsis" Wang, Qian & Liu 1999a

== See also ==
- List of bacterial orders
- List of bacteria genera
