= Ekmanianthe =

Scientific classification
- Kingdom: Plantae
- Clade: Tracheophytes
- Clade: Angiosperms
- Clade: Eudicots
- Clade: Asterids
- Order: Lamiales
- Family: Bignoniaceae
- Clade: Crescentiina
- Clade: Tabebuia alliance
- Genus: Ekmanianthe; Urban

Type species
- Ekmanianthe longiflora (Grisebach) Urban

Species
- Ekmanianthe longiflora Ekmanianthe actinophylla

Genus of flowering plants

Ekmanianthe is a genus of flowering plants in the family Bignoniaceae endemic to the Greater Antilles. It is most closely related to Tabebuia and has sometimes been included within it.

== Taxonomy ==
Both species of Ekmanianthe were originally described in 1866 by August Grisebach, who placed them in the genus Tecoma. In 1915, Nathaniel Lord Britton placed them in Tabebuia. In 1924, Ignatz Urban, recognizing their distinctiveness, erected the new genus Ekmanianthe in the journal now known as Feddes Repertorium, which was at that time edited by Friedrich Karl Georg Fedde. Ekmanianthe was named for the Swedish botanist Erik Leonard Ekman (1883-1931)."Anthe" is derived from a Greek word for "flower".

=== Species ===
It consists of two species of trees, both of which are considered Endangered by the IUCN Red List:

- Ekmanianthe longiflora grows to 18 m (59 ft) in height and is native to Hispaniola (the Dominican Republic and Haiti) and the rocky uplands of central Cuba. The type species for Ekmanianthe is E. longiflora.
- Ekmanianthe actinophylla is a smaller tree, to 10 m (33 ft) in height, and it only occurs in western Cuba, where it is known as "roble caimán" (English: "caiman oak"), for the resemblance of its trunk bark to the hide of a caiman. "Roble" is a Spanish name that is also applied to Tabebuia.

Neither of the species of Ekmanianthe is known in cultivation.

=== Evolution ===
The evolution of Ekmanianthe is in some ways parallel to that of the Asian tribe Oroxyleae. The bat-pollinated Oroxylum has actinomorphic flowers with five fertile stamens. The hawkmoth-pollinated Nyctocalos has elongate flowers and most of the species have only four fertile stamens.

== Description ==
The following description is based on two sources.

- Trees to 20 m (66 ft) tall with thick, ridged bark.
- Leaves opposite, long-petiolate, palmately compound; usually 5-foliate.
- Inflorescence terminal, few-flowered, racemose or narrowly paniculate.
- Calyx cupular, 5-parted, caducous.
- Corolla nearly actinomorphic.
- Corolla tube unlike that of most of Bignoniaceae in that it is not differentiated into two unlike parts, one above and one below the level of stamen insertion.
- Corolla lobes indistinct, deeply laciniate (irregularly cut into slender segments).
- Stamens 4 or 5, exserted or subexserted.
- Ovary linear, with ovules in 2 series.
- Fruit a linear capsule, slightly curved, subterete, with prominent, longitudinal ridges.
- Seeds thin, bialate (with 2 wings).

Ekmanianthe actinophylla is chiropterophilous (bat-pollinated). E. longiflora has the long, narrow corolla tube that is typical of hawkmoth-pollinated flowers.

The basally curved fruit of Ekmanianthe is a distinguishing feature, clearly separating that genus from Tabebuia. The edge of the corolla is laciniate in a few moth-pollinated and a few bat-pollinated species of Tabebuia, but much less so than in Ekmanianthe. The lenticels of E. longiflora and the costae (ribs) on the fruit of E. actinophylla are more prominent than those of any species of Tabebuia. The corolla tube of E. longiflora is longer than that of any species of Tabebuia. E. actinophylla has 5 fertile stamens, a trait not seen in Tabebuia.

The wood of Ekmanianthe has been variously described as "soft" or as "very hard, heavy, and strong". Despite this, like many other Tecomeae species, it is rarely cultivated.
