= Pseudonocardia parietis =

Scientific classification
- Domain: Bacteria
- Kingdom: Bacillati
- Phylum: Actinomycetota
- Class: Actinomycetes
- Order: Pseudonocardiales
- Family: Pseudonocardiaceae
- Genus: Pseudonocardia
- Species: P. parietis

Binomial name
- Pseudonocardia parietis Schäfer et al. 2009

Type strain
- 04-St-002, CCM 7582, DSM 45256, JCM 16609

Species of bacterium

Pseudonocardia parietis is a bacterium from the genus of Pseudonocardia which has been isolated from a wall which was colonized with mould in Stuttgart in Germany.

It is a bacterium that is Gram-positive, rod-shaped, spore-negative and is also a mycelium forming actinobacterium. It was found to have a 16s rRNA gene sequence and was shown to belong to the Pseudonocardiaceae family. It is most closely related to Pseudonocardia antarctica and Pseudonocardia alni.
