= Manduk =

Manduk may refer to:

- मण्डूक, manduk (the flower), a word in Hindi to describe the Oroxylum indicum tree
- Manduk, Bangladesh, a place in Chandpur Zl, Chittagong Div (23, 18, 0,N, 91, 0, 0,E)
