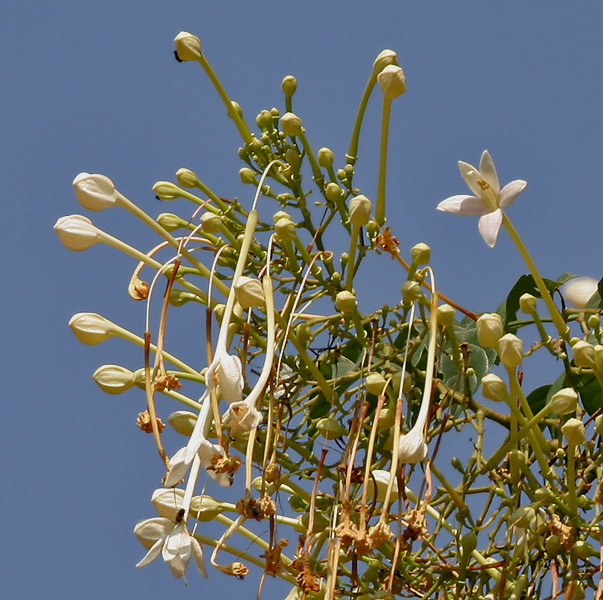

Scientific classification
- Kingdom: Plantae
- Clade: Tracheophytes
- Clade: Angiosperms
- Clade: Eudicots
- Clade: Asterids
- Order: Lamiales
- Family: Bignoniaceae
- Tribe: Oroxyleae
- Genus: Millingtonia; L.f.
- Species: M. hortensis

Binomial name
- Millingtonia hortensis L.f.

Synonyms
- Bignonia azedarachta König & Sims; Bignonia cicutaria K.D.Koenig ex Mart.; Bignonia hortensis (L.f.) Oken; Bignonia suberosa Roxb.; Millingtonia dubiosa Span.; Nevrilis suberosa Raf. nom. illeg.

= Millingtonia =

Genus of trees

Millingtonia hortensis, the tree jasmine or Indian cork tree, is the sole species in the genus Millingtonia, a tree native to South Asia and South East Asia.

In the name Millingtonia hortensis, Millingtonia is named for Sir Thomas Millington who was an inspiration to Carl Linnaeus the Younger who first described the genus. The specific epithet 'hortensia' derives from 'hortensis' and 'hortus' which in Latin is related to the garden. In its synonym, Bignonia suberosa, 'suberosa' derives from 'suberos' which means 'corky' in Latin.

Millingtonia Avenue in Lucknow is named after Millingtonia hortensis.

== Taxonomy ==
Genetic analysis suggests the closest relative of Millingtonia is the genus Oroxylum; this pair of genera are then probably next most closely related to a clade containing Catalpa and Chilopsis.

== Description ==
The tree grows to a height of between 18 and 25 metres and has a spread of 7 to 11 metres. It reaches maturity between 6 and 8 years of age and lives for up to 40 years. It is a versatile tree which can grow in various soil types and climates with a preference for moist climates.Like Nyctanthes arbor-tristis, it blooms during the night and sheds during the morning. Its flowers emit a pleasant smell.

=== Stem ===
The tree is evergreen and has an elongated pyramidal stem. The soft, yellowish-white wood is brittle and can break under strong gusts of wind.

=== Leaf ===
The leaf is imparipinnate and resembles that of the neem. Its leaves are prone to attack by Acherontia styx and Hyblaea puera.

=== Flower ===
The white flowers are shaped like large panicles. They are bisexual and zygomorphic. The bell-shaped sepals of the flower have five small lobes. The flower has four stamens with parallel anthers unlike in most other plants of this family where the anthers are divergent. The corolla is a long tube with five lobes.

=== Fruit and seed ===
The fruit is a smooth flat capsule and is partitioned into two. It contains broad-winged seeds. The fruits are fed on by birds which aid in seed dispersal. In cultivation, the viability of seeds is low unless they are sown immediately after the fruit ripens, so the plant is generally propagated through cuttings.

== Uses ==
The tree is considered ornamental and the pleasant fragrance of the flowers renders it ideal as a garden tree. The wood is also used as timber and the bark is used as an inferior substitute for cork. The leaves are also used as a cheap substitute for tobacco in cigarettes.

== Views of different aspects ==
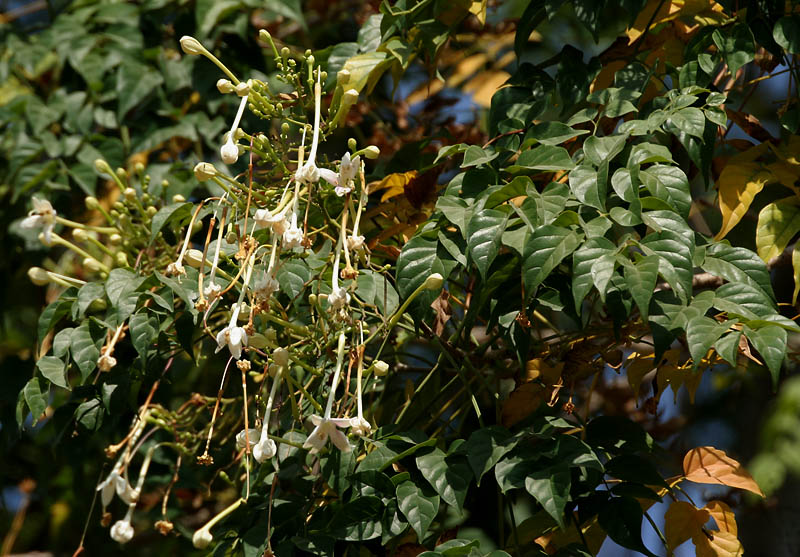
In Hyderabad, India

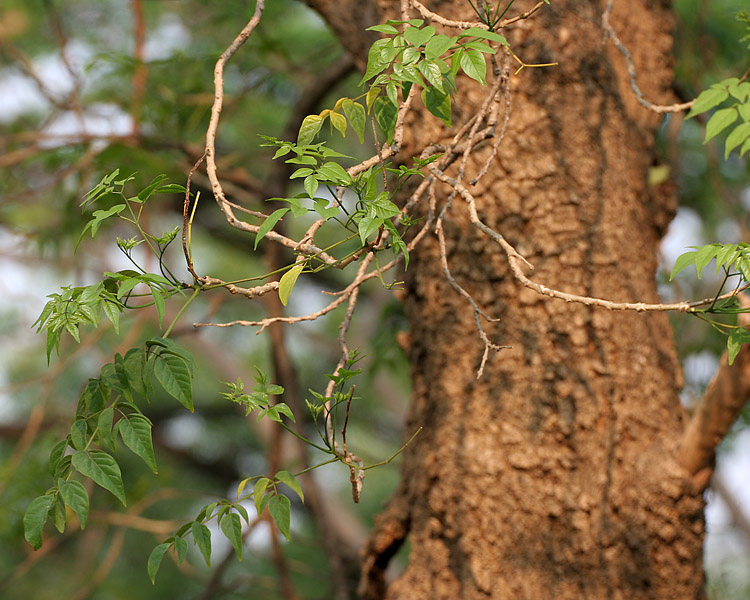
In Hyderabad

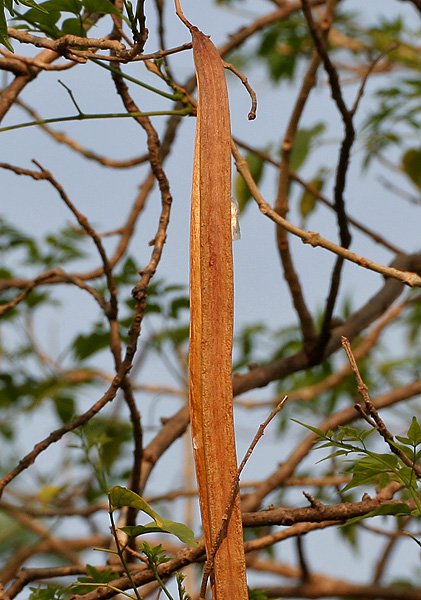
In Hyderabad

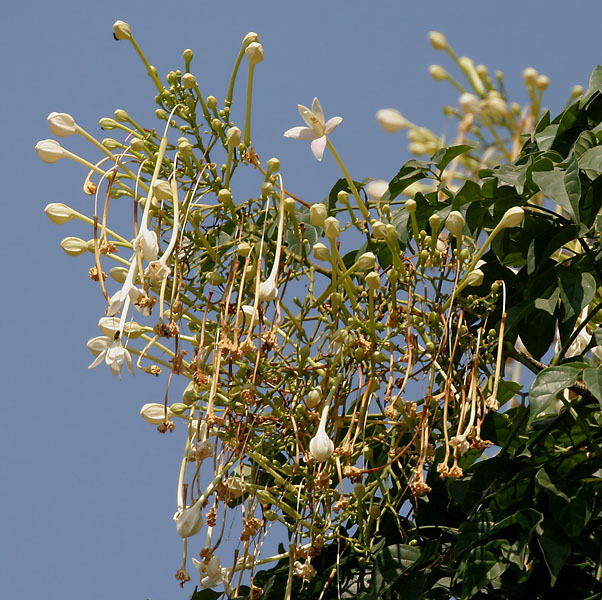
In Hyderabad

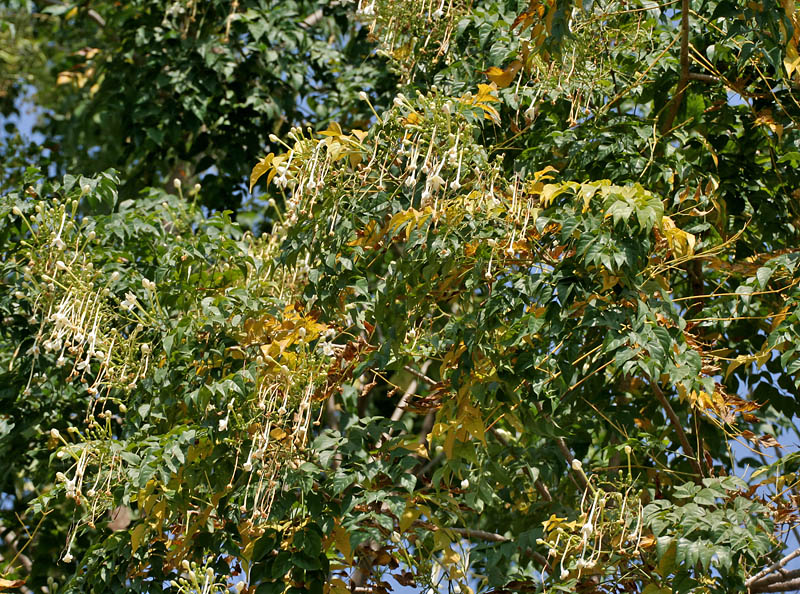
In Hyderabad

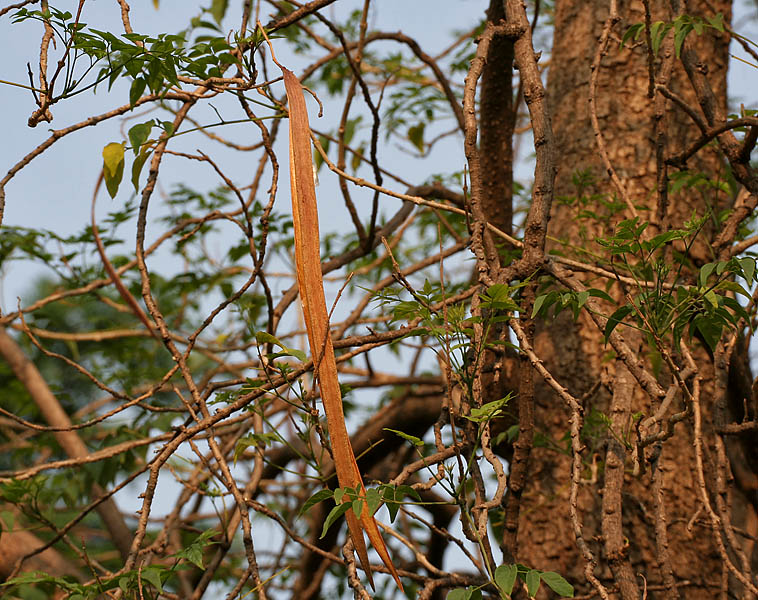
In Hyderabad
