= Pseudonocardia yuanmonensis =

Scientific classification
- Domain: Bacteria
- Kingdom: Bacillati
- Phylum: Actinomycetota
- Class: Actinomycetia
- Order: Pseudonocardiales
- Family: Pseudonocardiaceae
- Genus: Pseudonocardia
- Species: P. yuanmonensis

Binomial name
- Pseudonocardia yuanmonensis corrig. Nie et al. 2012

Type strain
- CCTCC AA 2011017, JCM 18055, YIM 75926

Synonyms
- Pseudonocardia yuanmoensis Nie et al. 2012

Species of bacterium

Pseudonocardia yuanmonensis is a bacterium from the genus of Pseudonocardia which has been isolated from forest soil in Yuanmo County, Yunnan Province, China.
