= Pseudonocardia alaniniphila =

Scientific classification
- Domain: Bacteria
- Kingdom: Bacillati
- Phylum: Actinomycetota
- Class: Actinomycetia
- Order: Pseudonocardiales
- Family: Pseudonocardiaceae
- Genus: Pseudonocardia
- Species: P. alaniniphila

Binomial name
- Pseudonocardia alaniniphila (Xu et al. 1999) Huang et al. 2002

Type strain
- AS 4.1536, CCTCC AA97001, CGMCC 4.1536, CIP 107367, DSM 44660, JCM 11837, Y-16303

Synonyms
- Actinobispora alaniniphila Xu et al. 1999

Species of bacterium

Pseudonocardia alaniniphila is a bacterium from the genus of Pseudonocardia which has been isolated from forest soil in China.
