= Pseudonocardia halophobica =

Scientific classification
- Domain: Bacteria
- Kingdom: Bacillati
- Phylum: Actinomycetota
- Class: Actinomycetia
- Order: Pseudonocardiales
- Family: Pseudonocardiaceae
- Genus: Pseudonocardia
- Species: P. halophobica

Binomial name
- Pseudonocardia halophobica (Akimov et al. 1989) McVeigh et al. 1994

Type strain
- ATCC 51535, CGMCC 4.1288, DSM 43089, DSM 656, IFO 15048, IMRU 1300, IMSNU 21327, JCM 9421, KCTC 9296, LL-SS1/1, NBRC 15048, NCIMB 13212, NRRL B-16064, NRRL B-16514, VKM Ac-1069, VKMAc-1069

Synonyms
- Pseudoamycolata halophobica Akimov et al. 1989

Species of bacterium

Pseudonocardia halophobica is a bacterium from the genus of Pseudonocardia which has been isolated from soil.
