= Pseudonocardia bannensis =

Scientific classification
- Domain: Bacteria
- Kingdom: Bacillati
- Phylum: Actinomycetota
- Class: Actinomycetia
- Order: Pseudonocardiales
- Family: Pseudonocardiaceae
- Genus: Pseudonocardia
- Species: P. bannensis

Binomial name
- Pseudonocardia bannensis corrig. Zhao et al. 2012

Type strain
- CCTCC AA 208077, DSM 45300, YIM 63101

Synonyms
- Pseudonocardia bannaensis Zhao et al. 2012

Species of bacterium

Pseudonocardia bannensis is a bacterium from the genus of Pseudonocardia which has been isolated from roots of the plant Artemisia annua in Yunnan in China.
