= Pseudonocardia seranimata =

Scientific classification
- Domain: Bacteria
- Kingdom: Bacillati
- Phylum: Actinomycetota
- Class: Actinomycetia
- Order: Pseudonocardiales
- Family: Pseudonocardiaceae
- Genus: Pseudonocardia
- Species: P. seranimata

Binomial name
- Pseudonocardia seranimata corrig. Zhao et al. 2012

Type strain
- CCTCC AA 208079, DSM 45302, YIM 63233

Synonyms
- Pseudonocardia serianimatus Zhao et al. 2012

Species of bacterium

Pseudonocardia seranimata is a bacterium from the genus of Pseudonocardia which has been isolated from the leaves of the plant Artemisia annua in Yunnan in China.
