= Pseudonocardia tetrahydrofuranoxydans =

Scientific classification
- Domain: Bacteria
- Kingdom: Bacillati
- Phylum: Actinomycetota
- Class: Actinomycetes
- Order: Pseudonocardiales
- Family: Pseudonocardiaceae
- Genus: Pseudonocardia
- Species: P. tetrahydrofuranoxydans

Binomial name
- Pseudonocardia tetrahydrofuranoxydans Kämpfer et al. 2006

Type strain
- CCUG 52126, CIP 109050, DSM 44239, JCM 14745, K1, M65, Sp I KI

Species of bacterium

Pseudonocardia tetrahydrofuranoxydans is a Gram-positive, rod-shaped and non-spore-forming bacterium from the genus of Pseudonocardia which was isolated from water from a waste water treatment plant in Germany.
