= Pseudonocardia sichuanensis =

Scientific classification
- Domain: Bacteria
- Kingdom: Bacillati
- Phylum: Actinomycetota
- Class: Actinomycetia
- Order: Pseudonocardiales
- Family: Pseudonocardiaceae
- Genus: Pseudonocardia
- Species: P. sichuanensis

Binomial name
- Pseudonocardia sichuanensis Qin et al. 2012

Type strain
- CCTCC AA 2010002, KCTC 19781, KLBMP 1115

Species of bacterium

Pseudonocardia sichuanensis is a bacterium from the genus of Pseudonocardia which has been isolated from the roots of the plant Jatropha curcas in Panzhihua in China.
