= Pseudonocardia khuvsgulensis =

Scientific classification
- Domain: Bacteria
- Kingdom: Bacillati
- Phylum: Actinomycetota
- Class: Actinomycetia
- Order: Pseudonocardiales
- Family: Pseudonocardiaceae
- Genus: Pseudonocardia
- Species: P. khuvsgulensis

Binomial name
- Pseudonocardia khuvsgulensis Ara et al. 2011

Type strain
- NBRC 105886, MN08-A0297, VTCC D9-26

Species of bacterium

Pseudonocardia khuvsgulensis is a bacterium from the genus of Pseudonocardia which has been isolated from soil near the Khuvsgul Lake in Khuvsgul in the Mongolia.
