= Pseudonocardia eucalypti =

Scientific classification
- Domain: Bacteria
- Kingdom: Bacillati
- Phylum: Actinomycetota
- Class: Actinomycetia
- Order: Pseudonocardiales
- Family: Pseudonocardiaceae
- Genus: Pseudonocardia
- Species: P. eucalypti

Binomial name
- Pseudonocardia eucalypti Kaewkla and Franco 2011

Type strain
- ACM 5285, DSM 45351, EUM 374

Species of bacterium

Pseudonocardia eucalypti is a bacterium from the genus of Pseudonocardia which has been isolated from the roots of the tree Eucalyptus microcarpa in Adelaide in Australia.
