= Pseudonocardia kunmingensis =

Scientific classification
- Domain: Bacteria
- Kingdom: Bacillati
- Phylum: Actinomycetota
- Class: Actinomycetia
- Order: Pseudonocardiales
- Family: Pseudonocardiaceae
- Genus: Pseudonocardia
- Species: P. kunmingensis

Binomial name
- Pseudonocardia kunmingensis Zhao et al. 2011

Type strain
- CCTCC AA 208078, CCTCC AA 208081, DSM 45301, YIM 63158

Species of bacterium

Pseudonocardia kunmingensis is a Gram-positive and aerobic bacterium from the genus of Pseudonocardia which has been isolated from the roots of the plant Artemisia annua in Kunming in China.
