= Pseudonocardia babensis =

Scientific classification
- Domain: Bacteria
- Kingdom: Bacillati
- Phylum: Actinomycetota
- Class: Actinomycetia
- Order: Pseudonocardiales
- Family: Pseudonocardiaceae
- Genus: Pseudonocardia
- Species: P. babensis

Binomial name
- Pseudonocardia babensis Sakiyama et al. 2010

Type strain
- NBRC 105793, VN05A0561, VTCC-A-1757

Species of bacterium

Pseudonocardia babensis is a bacterium from the genus of Pseudonocardia which has been isolated from a Plant litter from the Ba Bể National Park in Vietnam.
