= Pseudonocardia zijingensis =

Scientific classification
- Domain: Bacteria
- Kingdom: Bacillati
- Phylum: Actinomycetota
- Class: Actinomycetia
- Order: Pseudonocardiales
- Family: Pseudonocardiaceae
- Genus: Pseudonocardia
- Species: P. zijingensis

Binomial name
- Pseudonocardia zijingensis Huang et al. 2002

Type strain
- 6330, AS 4.1545, BCRC 16328, CCRC 16328, CGMCC 4.1545, CIP 107621, DSM 44774, JCM 11117

Species of bacterium

Pseudonocardia zijingensis is a bacterium from the genus of Pseudonocardia which has been isolated from soil in China.
