= Pseudonocardia rhizophila =

Scientific classification
- Domain: Bacteria
- Kingdom: Bacillati
- Phylum: Actinomycetota
- Class: Actinomycetia
- Order: Pseudonocardiales
- Family: Pseudonocardiaceae
- Genus: Pseudonocardia
- Species: P. rhizophila

Binomial name
- Pseudonocardia rhizophila Li et al. 2012

Type strain
- CCTCC AA 209043, DSM 45381, LMG 28634, YIM 67013

Species of bacterium

Pseudonocardia rhizophila is a bacterium from the genus of Pseudonocardia which has been isolated from rhizosphere soil from the plant Tripterygium wilfordii in Yunnan in China.
