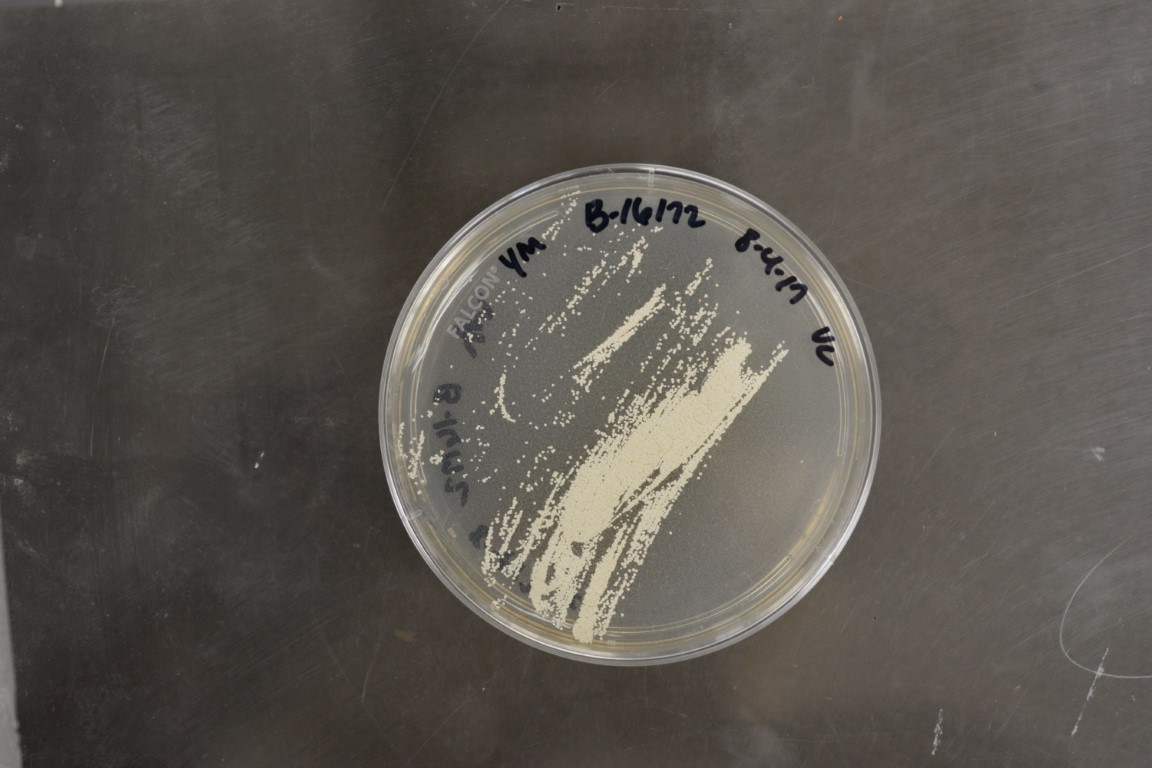

Scientific classification
- Domain: Bacteria
- Kingdom: Bacillati
- Phylum: Actinomycetota
- Class: Actinomycetia
- Order: Pseudonocardiales
- Family: Pseudonocardiaceae
- Genus: Pseudonocardia
- Species: P. saturnea

Binomial name
- Pseudonocardia saturnea (Hirsch 1960) Warwick et al. 1994

Type strain
- 71, ATCC 15809, BCRC 13741, CBS 615.67, CCRC 13741, CGMCC 4.1216, DSM 43195, Hirsch71, IFM 268, IFO 14499, IMET 7647, IMRU 1181, IMSNU 20052, JCM 3187, KCC A-0187, KCCA-0187, KCTC 9292, MTCC 696, NBRC 14499, NCIB 9437, NCIMB 9437, NRRL B-16172, VKM Ac-781

Synonyms
- Amycolata saturnea (Hirsch 1960) Lechevalier et al. 1986; Nocardia saturnea Hirsch 1960 (Approved Lists 1980)

= Pseudonocardia saturnea =

Species of bacterium

Pseudonocardia saturnea is a bacterium from the genus of Pseudonocardia which has been isolated from air.
