= Pseudonocardia kongjuensis =

Scientific classification
- Domain: Bacteria
- Kingdom: Bacillati
- Phylum: Actinomycetota
- Class: Actinomycetia
- Order: Pseudonocardiales
- Family: Pseudonocardiaceae
- Genus: Pseudonocardia
- Species: P. kongjuensis

Binomial name
- Pseudonocardia kongjuensis Lee et al. 2001

Type strain
- CGMCC 1.3640, CIP 108046, DSM 44525, IMSNU 50583, JCM 11896, JCM 11896 KCTC 9990, KCTC 9990, LM 157, NBRC 100380, VKM Ac-2517

Species of bacterium

Pseudonocardia kongjuensis is a bacterium from the genus of Pseudonocardia which has been isolated from a gold mine near Kongju on Korea.
