= Pseudonocardia salamisensis =

Scientific classification
- Domain: Bacteria
- Kingdom: Bacillati
- Phylum: Actinomycetota
- Class: Actinomycetia
- Order: Pseudonocardiales
- Family: Pseudonocardiaceae
- Genus: Pseudonocardia
- Species: P. salamisensis

Binomial name
- Pseudonocardia salamisensis Sahin et al. 2014

Type strain
- DSM 45717, K236, KCTC 29100

Species of bacterium

Pseudonocardia salamisensis is a bacterium from the genus of Pseudonocardia which has been isolated from soil.
