= Pseudonocardia sediminis =

Scientific classification
- Domain: Bacteria
- Kingdom: Bacillati
- Phylum: Actinomycetota
- Class: Actinomycetia
- Order: Pseudonocardiales
- Family: Pseudonocardiaceae
- Genus: Pseudonocardia
- Species: P. sediminis

Binomial name
- Pseudonocardia sediminis Zhang et al. 2014

Type strain
- DSM 45779, JCM 18540, M13141, YIM M13141

Species of bacterium

Pseudonocardia sediminis is a Gram-positive and aerobic bacterium from the genus of Pseudonocardia which has been isolated from marine sediments from the South China Sea.
