= Pseudonocardia hierapolitana =

Scientific classification
- Domain: Bacteria
- Kingdom: Bacillati
- Phylum: Actinomycetota
- Class: Actinomycetia
- Order: Pseudonocardiales
- Family: Pseudonocardiaceae
- Genus: Pseudonocardia
- Species: P. hierapolitana

Binomial name
- Pseudonocardia hierapolitana Sahin et al. 2014

Type strain
- DSM 45671, KCTC 29068, NRRL B-24879, PM2084

Species of bacterium

Pseudonocardia hierapolitana is a bacterium from the genus of Pseudonocardia which has been isolated from soil.
