= Pseudonocardia antitumoralis =

Scientific classification
- Domain: Bacteria
- Kingdom: Bacillati
- Phylum: Actinomycetota
- Class: Actinomycetia
- Order: Pseudonocardiales
- Family: Pseudonocardiaceae
- Genus: Pseudonocardia
- Species: P. antitumoralis

Binomial name
- Pseudonocardia antitumoralis Tian et al. 2013

Type strain
- CCTCC M 2011255, DSM 45322, SCSIO 01299

Species of bacterium

Pseudonocardia antitumoralis is a bacterium from the genus of Pseudonocardia which has been isolated from deep-sea sediments from the South China Sea. Pseudonocardia antitumoralis produces deoxynyboquinone, pseudonocardian A, pseudonocardian B, and pseudonocardian C.
