= Pseudonocardia petroleophila =

Scientific classification
- Domain: Bacteria
- Kingdom: Bacillati
- Phylum: Actinomycetota
- Class: Actinomycetia
- Order: Pseudonocardiales
- Family: Pseudonocardiaceae
- Genus: Pseudonocardia
- Species: P. petroleophila

Binomial name
- Pseudonocardia petroleophila (Hirsch and Engel 1956) Warwick et al. 1994

Type strain
- 102, 78, ATCC 15777, B-16301, BCRC 13694, CCRC 13694, CGMCC 4.1532, CIP 104515, DSM 43193, DSM 536, DSM 655, Hirsch78, IFAM 78, IFM 243, IFO 14406, IMET 7162, IMSNU 22072, JCM 3378, JCM 3394, KCTC 1060, MTCC 273, NBRC 14406, NCIB 9438, NCIMB 9438, NRRL B-16301, NRRL B-3075, NRRL B-B-16301, UAMH 4713, VKM Ac-865

Synonyms
- Nocardia petroleophila Hirsch and Engel 1956 (Approved Lists 1980)

Species of bacterium

Pseudonocardia petroleophila is a bacterium from the genus of Pseudonocardia which has been isolated from soil.
