= Pseudonocardia alni subsp. carboxydivorans =

Scientific classification
- Domain: Bacteria
- Kingdom: Bacillati
- Phylum: Actinomycetota
- Class: Actinomycetes
- Order: Pseudonocardiales
- Family: Pseudonocardiaceae
- Genus: Pseudonocardia
- Species: P. carboxydivorans

Binomial name
- Pseudonocardia carboxydivorans Park et al. 2008

Type strain
- JCM 14827, KCCM 42678, SWP-2006, Y8

Species of bacterium

Pseudonocardia carboxydivorans is a bacterium from the genus of Pseudonocardia which has been isolated from soil in Seoul in Korea. Pseudonocardia carboxydivorans has the ability to oxidize carbon monoxide.
