= Pseudonocardia xishanensis =

Scientific classification
- Domain: Bacteria
- Kingdom: Bacillati
- Phylum: Actinomycetota
- Class: Actinomycetia
- Order: Pseudonocardiales
- Family: Pseudonocardiaceae
- Genus: Pseudonocardia
- Species: P. xishanensis

Binomial name
- Pseudonocardia xishanensis Zhao et al. 2012

Type strain
- JCM 17906, KCTC 29005, YIM 63638

Species of bacterium

Pseudonocardia xishanensis is a Gram-positive and non-motile bacterium from the genus of Pseudonocardia which has been isolated from the roots of the plant Artemisia annua from the Xishan Mountains in China.
