= Pseudonocardia mongoliensis =

Scientific classification
- Domain: Bacteria
- Kingdom: Bacillati
- Phylum: Actinomycetota
- Class: Actinomycetia
- Order: Pseudonocardiales
- Family: Pseudonocardiaceae
- Genus: Pseudonocardia
- Species: P. mongoliensis

Binomial name
- Pseudonocardia mongoliensis Ara et al. 2011

Type strain
- ATCC 51535, DSM 43089, IFO 15048, IMRU 1300, IMSNU 21327

Species of bacterium

Pseudonocardia mongoliensis is a bacterium from the genus of Pseudonocardia which has been isolated from soil near the Khuvsgul Lake in Khuvsgul in the Mongolia.
