= Pseudonocardia endophytica =

Scientific classification
- Domain: Bacteria
- Kingdom: Bacillati
- Phylum: Actinomycetota
- Class: Actinomycetia
- Order: Pseudonocardiales
- Family: Pseudonocardiaceae
- Genus: Pseudonocardia
- Species: P. endophytica

Binomial name
- Pseudonocardia endophytica Chen et al. 2009

Type strain
- CCTCC AA 206026, DSM 44969, JCM 16220, KCTC 19150, YIM 56035

Species of bacterium

Pseudonocardia endophytica is a Gram-positive and aerobic bacterium from the genus of Pseudonocardia which has been isolated from the plant Lobelia clavata in Xishuangbanna in China.
