= Pseudonocardia aurantiaca =

Scientific classification
- Domain: Bacteria
- Kingdom: Bacillati
- Phylum: Actinomycetota
- Class: Actinomycetia
- Order: Pseudonocardiales
- Family: Pseudonocardiaceae
- Genus: Pseudonocardia
- Species: P. aurantiaca

Binomial name
- Pseudonocardia aurantiaca (Xu et al. 1999) Huang et al. 2002

Type strain
- AS 4.1537, CCTCC AA97002, CGMCC 4.1537, DSM 44773, JCM 11838, Y-14860

Synonyms
- Actinobispora aurantiaca Xu et al. 1999

Species of bacterium

Pseudonocardia aurantiaca is a Gram-positive and aerobic bacterium from the genus of Pseudonocardia which has been isolated from soil from Jianchuan in China.
