= Pseudonocardia adelaidensis =

Scientific classification
- Domain: Bacteria
- Kingdom: Bacillati
- Phylum: Actinomycetota
- Class: Actinomycetia
- Order: Pseudonocardiales
- Family: Pseudonocardiaceae
- Genus: Pseudonocardia
- Species: P. adelaidensis

Binomial name
- Pseudonocardia adelaidensis Kaewkla and Franco 2010

Type strain
- ACM 5286, DSM 45352, EUM 211

Species of bacterium

Pseudonocardia adelaidensis is a bacterium from the genus of Pseudonocardia which has been isolated from the stem of the tree Eucalyptus microcarpa in Adelaide in Australia.
