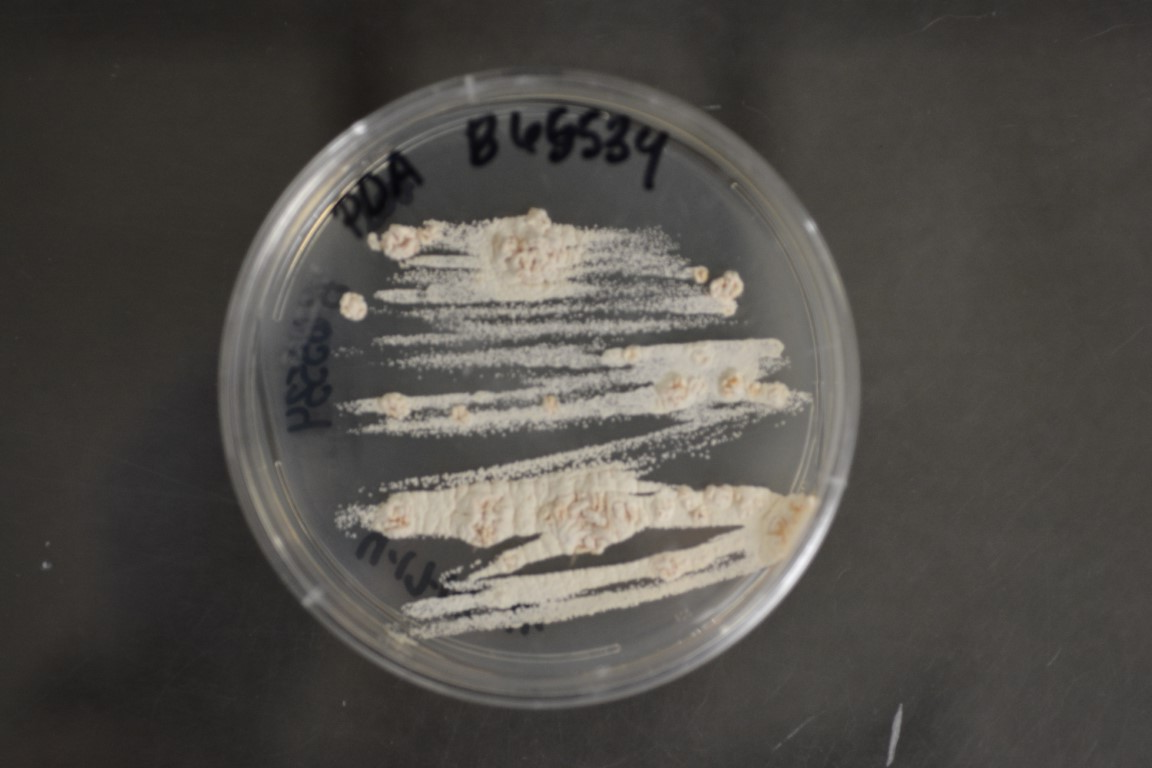
- Pseudonocardia pini on agar plate

Scientific classification
- Domain: Bacteria
- Kingdom: Bacillati
- Phylum: Actinomycetota
- Class: Actinomycetes
- Order: Pseudonocardiales
- Family: Pseudonocardiaceae
- Genus: Pseudonocardia; Henssen 1957 (Approved Lists 1980)

Type species
- Pseudonocardia thermophila Henssen 1957 (Approved Lists 1980)

Species
- See text.

Synonyms
- Actinobispora Jiang et al. 1991; Amycolata Lechevalier et al. 1986; Pseudoamycolata Akimov et al. 1989

= Pseudonocardia =

Genus of bacteria

Pseudonocardia is a genus of the bacteria family Pseudonocardiaceae. Members of this genus have been found living mutualistically on the cuticle of the leafcutter ants because the bacteria has antibiotic properties that protect the fungus grown by the ants. When they are grooming, their legs are passed over their mouth gland (metapleural gland) that produces the antibiotic and then their legs touch the fungi while they are walking around. The ants have metapleural glands that produce the antimicrobial components to eliminate the Escovopsis fungi. The bacteria may also be found in crypts on the propleural plate. Pseudonocardia is found to have antibiotic properties provided to the leaf-cutter ant to inhibit the growth of Escovopsis, which is a black yeast that parasitizes the leaf-cutter ant. Pseudonocardia can be found in both aquatic (including marine) and terrestrial ecosystems. Pseudonocardia belongs to the phylum Actinobacteria. Most Actinobacteria grow in soils that are of a neutral pH. Actinobacteria are also important in plant-associated microbial communities are referred to as "free-living." This means that they are not dependent on another organism to live. For example: A non-free-living organism would be a parasite that depends on a host as a food source and a place for shelter. "Free-living" also allows these organisms to require less energy and food for survival. Bacteria from the Pseudonocardia genus are catalase-positive, non-motile, aerobic, non-acid-fast and produce a gram positive reaction. Under the microscope they exhibit branching, rod-shaped organisms.
There are many different strains of Pseudonocardia and a good portion of these strains have been found in China, in soils of the forest, and in Eucalyptus trees of Australia.

== Species ==
Pseudonocardia comprises the following species:

- P. abyssalis Parra et al. 2021
- P. acaciae Duangmal et al. 2009
- P. acidicola Klaysubun et al. 2020
- P. adelaidensis Kaewkla and Franco 2010
- P. ailaonensis Qin et al. 2008
- P. alaniniphila (Xu et al. 1999) Huang et al. 2002
- P. alni (Evtushenko et al. 1989) Warwick et al. 1994
- P. ammonioxydans Liu et al. 2006
- P. antarctica Prabahar et al. 2004
- P. antimicrobica Zhao et al. 2021
- P. antitumoralis corrig. Tian et al. 2013
- P. artemisiae Zhao et al. 2011
- P. asaccharolytica Reichert et al. 1998
- P. aurantiaca (Xu et al. 1999) Huang et al. 2002
- P. autotrophica (Takamiya and Tubaki 1956) Warwick et al. 1994
- P. babensis Sakiyama et al. 2010
- P. bannensis corrig. Zhao et al. 2012
- P. benzenivorans Kämpfer and Kroppenstedt 2004
- P. broussonetiae Mo et al. 2021
- P. carboxydivorans Park et al. 2008
- P. chloroethenivorans Lee et al. 2004
- P. compacta Henssen et al. 1983
- P. cypriaca Sahin et al. 2014
- "P. cytotoxica" Dhaneesha et al. 2021
- P. dioxanivorans Mahendra and Alvarez-Cohen 2005
- P. endophytica Chen et al. 2009
- P. eucalypti Kaewkla and Franco 2011
- P. halophobica (Akimov et al. 1989) McVeigh et al. 1994
- P. hierapolitana Sahin et al. 2014
- P. hispaniensis Cuesta et al. 2013
- "P. humida" Zan et al. 2022
- P. hydrocarbonoxydans (Nolof and Hirsch 1962) Warwick et al. 1994
- P. khuvsgulensis Ara et al. 2011
- P. kongjuensis Lee et al. 2001
- P. kujensis Sahin et al. 2014
- P. kunmingensis Zhao et al. 2011
- P. lutea Gao et al. 2018
- P. mangrovi Chanama et al. 2018
- P. mongoliensis Ara et al. 2011
- P. nantongensis Xing et al. 2014
- P. nematodicida Liu et al. 2015
- P. nigra Trujillo et al. 2017
- P. nitrificans (ex Schatz et al. 1954) Warwick et al. 1994
- P. oceani Parra et al. 2021
- P. oroxyli Gu et al. 2006
- P. parietis Schäfer et al. 2009
- P. petroleophila (Hirsch and Engel 1956) Warwick et al. 1994
- P. pini Kaewkla and Franco 2022
- P. profundimaris Zhang et al. 2017
- P. rhizophila Li et al. 2012
- P. salamisensis Sahin et al. 2014
- P. saturnea (Hirsch 1960) Warwick et al. 1994

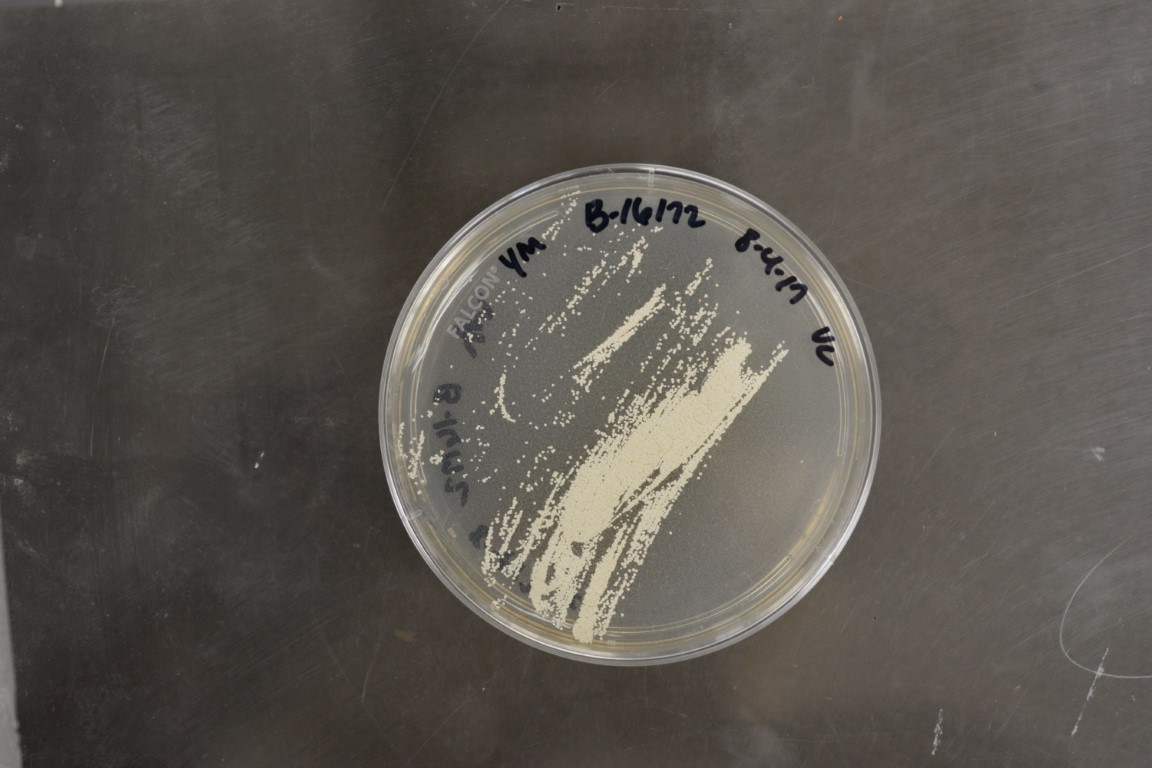
Pseudonocardia saturnea on agar plate

- P. sediminis Zhang et al. 2014
- P. seranimata corrig. Zhao et al. 2012
- P. sichuanensis Qin et al. 2012
- P. soli Thawai 2018
- P. spinosa Schäfer 1971 (Approved Lists 1980)
- P. spinosispora Lee et al. 2002
- P. sulfidoxydans Reichert et al. 1998
- P. terrae Muangham and Duangmal 2022
- P. tetrahydrofuranoxydans Kämpfer et al. 2006
- P. thailandensis Sujarit et al. 2017
- P. thermophila Henssen 1957 (Approved Lists 1980)
- "P. tritici" Song et al. 2019
- P. tropica Qin et al. 2010
- P. xinjiangensis (Xu et al. 1999) Huang et al. 2002
- P. xishanensis Zhao et al. 2012
- P. yuanmonensis corrig. Nie et al. 2012
- P. yunnanensis (Jiang et al. 1991) Huang et al. 2002
- P. zijingensis Huang et al. 2002
