= Pseudonocardia nematodicida =

Scientific classification
- Domain: Bacteria
- Kingdom: Bacillati
- Phylum: Actinomycetota
- Class: Actinomycetia
- Order: Pseudonocardiales
- Family: Pseudonocardiaceae
- Genus: Pseudonocardia
- Species: P. nematodicida

Binomial name
- Pseudonocardia nematodicida Liu et al. 2015

Type strain
- CGMCC 4.7118, DSM 45940, HA11164, HA12591

Species of bacterium

Pseudonocardia nematodicida is a Gram-positive bacterium from the genus of Pseudonocardia which has been isolated from mangrove soil from the Dongzhaigang National Nature Reserve in China.
