= Pseudonocardia compacta =

Scientific classification
- Domain: Bacteria
- Kingdom: Bacillati
- Phylum: Actinomycetota
- Class: Actinomycetia
- Order: Pseudonocardiales
- Family: Pseudonocardiaceae
- Genus: Pseudonocardia
- Species: P. compacta

Binomial name
- Pseudonocardia compacta Henssen et al. 1983

Type strain
- ATCC 35407, CBS 160.82, CGMCC 4.1534, DSM 43592, IFO 14343, IMSNU 20111, JCM 7438, KCTC 9294, MB H-146, MBH 146, NBRC 14343, NRRL B-16170, VKM Ac-897

Species of bacterium

Pseudonocardia compacta is a mesophilic bacterium from the genus of Pseudonocardia which has been isolated from garden soil.
