= Pseudonocardia tropica =

Scientific classification
- Domain: Bacteria
- Kingdom: Bacillati
- Phylum: Actinomycetota
- Class: Actinomycetia
- Order: Pseudonocardiales
- Family: Pseudonocardiaceae
- Genus: Pseudonocardia
- Species: P. tropica

Binomial name
- Pseudonocardia tropica Qin et al. 2010

Type strain
- CCTCC AA 208018, DSM 45199, YIM 61452

Species of bacterium

Pseudonocardia tropica is a bacterium from the genus of Pseudonocardia which has been isolated from the stem of the tree Maytenus austroyunnanensis in Xishuangbanna in China.
