= Pseudonocardia benzenivorans =

Scientific classification
- Domain: Bacteria
- Kingdom: Bacillati
- Phylum: Actinomycetota
- Class: Actinomycetia
- Order: Pseudonocardiales
- Family: Pseudonocardiaceae
- Genus: Pseudonocardia
- Species: P. benzenivorans

Binomial name
- Pseudonocardia benzenivorans Kämpfer and Kroppenstedt 2004

Species of bacterium

Pseudonocardia benzenivorans is a Gram-positive, rod-shaped, non-spore-forming bacterium, with type strain B5^{T}(=DSM 44703^{T} =CIP 107928^{T}).
