= Pseudonocardia nitrificans =

Scientific classification
- Domain: Bacteria
- Kingdom: Bacillati
- Phylum: Actinomycetota
- Class: Actinomycetia
- Order: Pseudonocardiales
- Family: Pseudonocardiaceae
- Genus: Pseudonocardia
- Species: P. nitrificans

Binomial name
- Pseudonocardia nitrificans (ex Schatz et al. 1954) Warwick et al. 1994

Type strain
- DSM 46014, IMET 7168

Synonyms
- "Streptomyces nitrificans" Schatz et al. 1954

Species of bacterium

Pseudonocardia nitrificans is a bacterium from the genus of Pseudonocardia.
