= Pseudonocardia hydrocarbonoxydans =

Scientific classification
- Domain: Bacteria
- Kingdom: Bacillati
- Phylum: Actinomycetota
- Class: Actinomycetia
- Order: Pseudonocardiales
- Family: Pseudonocardiaceae
- Genus: Pseudonocardia
- Species: P. hydrocarbonoxydans

Binomial name
- Pseudonocardia hydrocarbonoxydans (Nolof and Hirsch 1962) Warwick et al. 1994

Type strain
- 70, 70(N42), ATCC 15104, BCRC 13740, CCRC 13740, CGMCC 4.1218, DSM 43281, HUT-6554, IFO 14498, IMET 7645, IMRU N4ZG, IMSNU 22140, JCM 3392, KCTC 1059, KCTC 9301, KCTC 9692, N42, NBRC 14498, NCIB 9436, NCIM 2386, NCIMB 9436, NRRL B-16171, PCM 2249, Schering 228, VKM Ac-799, VTT E-073031

Synonyms
- Amycolata hydrocarbonoxydans (Nolof and Hirsch 1962) Lechevalier et al. 1986; Nocardia hydrocarbonoxydans Nolof and Hirsch 1962 (Approved Lists 1980)

Species of bacterium

Pseudonocardia hydrocarbonoxydans is a bacterium from the genus of Pseudonocardia which has been isolated from air contaminant. Pseudonocardia hydrocarbonoxydans can oxidize hydrocarbons.
