= Pseudonocardia spinosa =

Scientific classification
- Domain: Bacteria
- Kingdom: Bacillati
- Phylum: Actinomycetota
- Class: Actinomycetia
- Order: Pseudonocardiales
- Family: Pseudonocardiaceae
- Genus: Pseudonocardia
- Species: P. spinosa

Binomial name
- Pseudonocardia spinosa Schäfer 1971 (Approved Lists 1980)

Type strain
- ATCC 25924, CBS 818.70, IFO 16002, JCM 3136, KCC A-0136, MB SH-1, NBRC 16002

Species of bacterium

Pseudonocardia spinosa is a bacterium from the genus of Pseudonocardia.
