= Pseudonocardia hispaniensis =

Scientific classification
- Domain: Bacteria
- Kingdom: Bacillati
- Phylum: Actinomycetota
- Class: Actinomycetia
- Order: Pseudonocardiales
- Family: Pseudonocardiaceae
- Genus: Pseudonocardia
- Species: P. hispaniensis

Binomial name
- Pseudonocardia hispaniensis Cuesta et al. 2013

Type strain
- CCM 8391, CECT 8030, KCTC 29108, PA3

Species of bacterium

Pseudonocardia hispaniensis is a bacterium from the genus of Pseudonocardia which has been isolated from a wastewater treatment plant in Palos de la Frontera in Spain.
