= Pseudonocardia artemisiae =

Scientific classification
- Domain: Bacteria
- Kingdom: Bacillati
- Phylum: Actinomycetota
- Class: Actinomycetia
- Order: Pseudonocardiales
- Family: Pseudonocardiaceae
- Genus: Pseudonocardia
- Species: P. artemisiae

Binomial name
- Pseudonocardia artemisiae Zhao et al. 2011

Type strain
- CCTCC AA 208081, DSM 45313, YIM 63587

Species of bacterium

Pseudonocardia artemisiae is a bacterium from the genus of Pseudonocardia which has been isolated from the roots of the plant Artemisia annua in Yunnan in China.
