= Pseudonocardia nantongensis =

Scientific classification
- Domain: Bacteria
- Kingdom: Bacillati
- Phylum: Actinomycetota
- Class: Actinomycetia
- Order: Pseudonocardiales
- Family: Pseudonocardiaceae
- Genus: Pseudonocardia
- Species: P. nantongensis

Binomial name
- Pseudonocardia nantongensis Xing et al. 2014

Type strain
- KCTC 29053, NBRC 108677, KLBMP 1282, KLBMP1282

Species of bacterium

Pseudonocardia nantongensis is a bacterium from the genus of Pseudonocardia which ash been isolated from the leaves of the plant Tamarix chinensis from Nantong in China.
