= Pseudonocardia sulfidoxydans =

Scientific classification
- Domain: Bacteria
- Kingdom: Bacillati
- Phylum: Actinomycetota
- Class: Actinomycetia
- Order: Pseudonocardiales
- Family: Pseudonocardiaceae
- Genus: Pseudonocardia
- Species: P. sulfidoxydans

Binomial name
- Pseudonocardia sulfidoxydans Reichert et al. 1998

Species of bacterium

Pseudonocardia sulfidoxydans is a dimethyl disulfide-degrading actinomycete, with type strain DSM 44248^{T}.
