= Hieris =

Scientific classification
- Kingdom: Plantae
- Clade: Tracheophytes
- Clade: Angiosperms
- Clade: Eudicots
- Clade: Asterids
- Order: Lamiales
- Family: Bignoniaceae
- Tribe: Oroxyleae
- Genus: Hieris; Steenis
- Species: H. curtisii

Binomial name
- Hieris curtisii (Ridl.) Steenis

Genus of flowering plants

Hieris is a genus of flowering plants belonging to the family Bignoniaceae. The only species is Hieris curtisii.

Its native range is Malaysian Peninsula.
