= Pseudonocardia ammonioxydans =

Scientific classification
- Domain: Bacteria
- Kingdom: Bacillati
- Phylum: Actinomycetota
- Class: Actinomycetia
- Order: Pseudonocardiales
- Family: Pseudonocardiaceae
- Genus: Pseudonocardia
- Species: P. ammonioxydans

Binomial name
- Pseudonocardia ammonioxydans Liu et al. 2006

Type strain
- AS 4.1877, CGMCC 4.1877, CIP 109186, DSM 44958, JCM 12462, H9

Species of bacterium

Pseudonocardia ammonioxydans is a bacterium from the genus of Pseudonocardia which has been isolated from coastal sediments from the Jiaodong peninsula in China.
