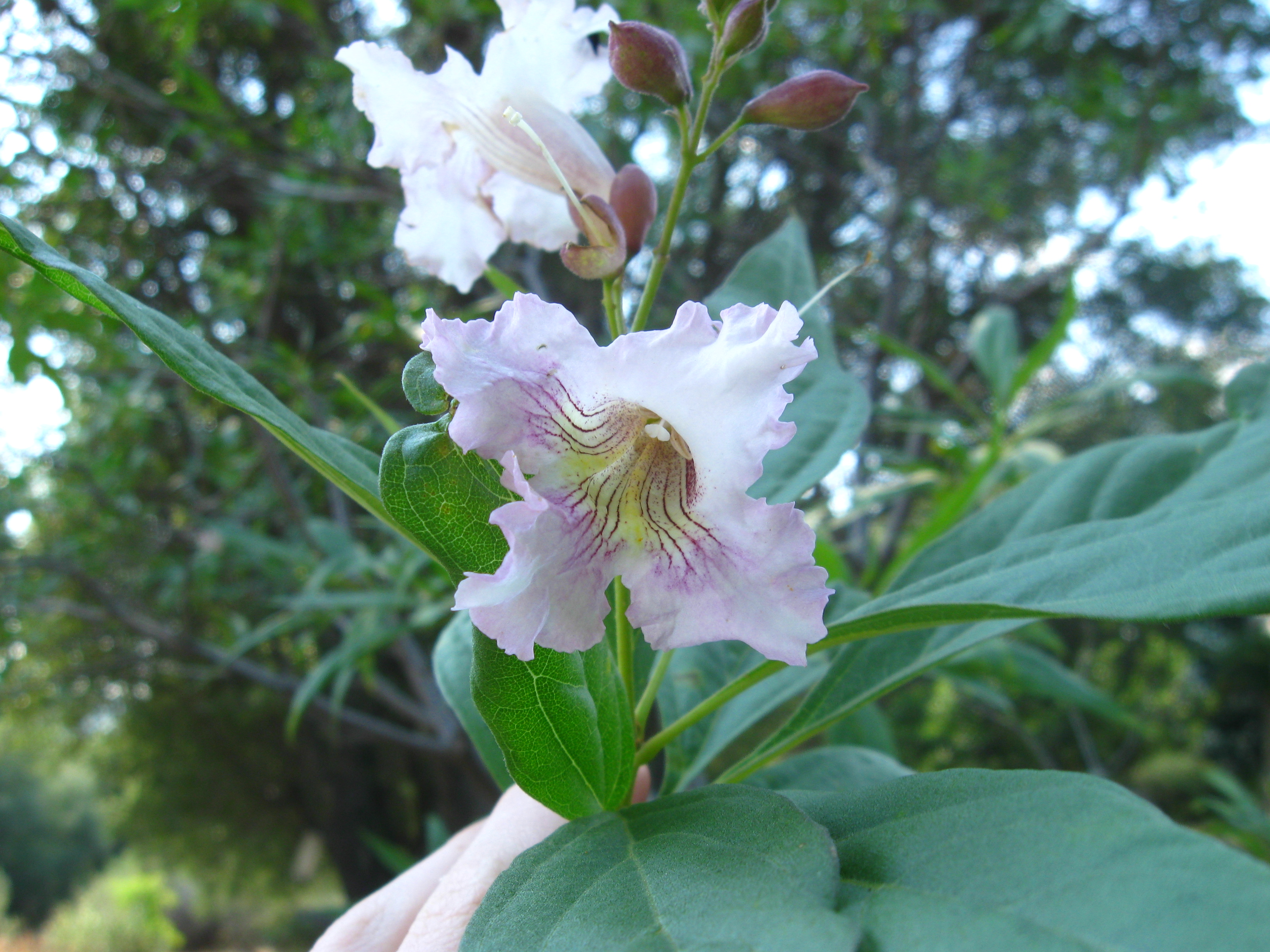
- 'Morning Cloud' chitalpa

Scientific classification
- Kingdom: Plantae
- Clade: Tracheophytes
- Clade: Angiosperms
- Clade: Eudicots
- Clade: Asterids
- Order: Lamiales
- Family: Bignoniaceae
- Tribe: Catalpeae
- Genus: × Chitalpa; T.S.Elias & Wisura
- Species: × C. tashkentensis

Binomial name
- × Chitalpa tashkentensis T.S.Ellis & Wisura

= × Chitalpa =

Species of tree

×Chitalpa is an intergeneric hybrid flowering tree in the family Bignoniaceae. There are two major forms in North America, the 'Morning Cloud' a hybrid of desert willow (Chilopsis linearis) for desert hardiness and color, and northern catalpa (Catalpa speciosa), and the 'Pink Dawn' variety formed as a hybrid of desert willow and either yellow catalpa (Catalpa ovata) or northern catalpa (Catalpa speciosa). Both forms were originally thought to be hybrids of desert willow and southern catalpa (Catalpa bignonioides). The name is nothogeneric, or a combination of the two parents' names. Leaves are lanceolate, 10 to 13 cm (4 to 5 in) long and 2.5 cm (1 in) wide, almost always in whorls of three. The trumpet-shaped flowers are 2.5 cm (1 in) long and frilly. The inflorescence is indeterminate, with alternately arranged flowers.

== Cultivation ==
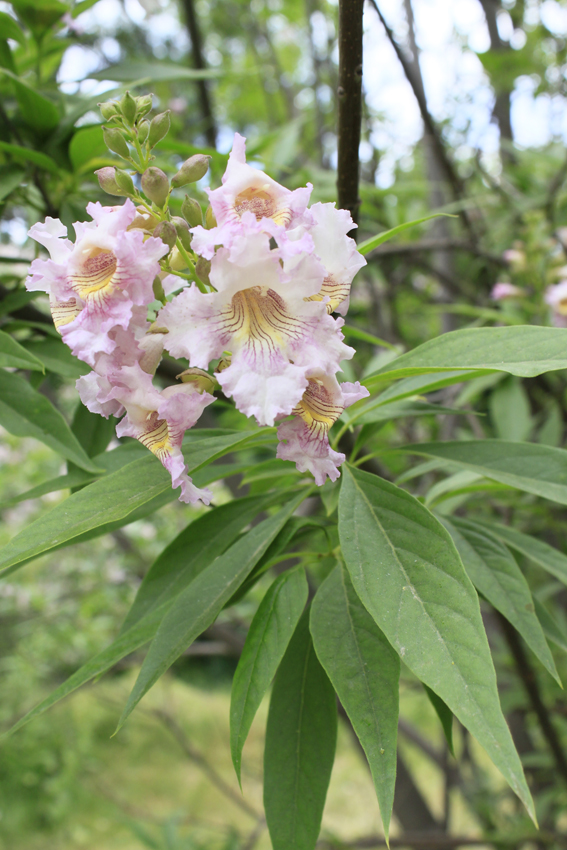
xChitalpa 'Pink Dawn'

× Chitalpa is dry-spell tolerant and fast-growing (some meters or several feet a year to 6–9 m or 20–30 ft) and blooms between late spring and late fall. Cultivars include: 'Pink Dawn' with pink flowers, 'Morning Cloud' with white and pale pink blooms, and a recent addition, "Summer Bells Minsum." It is a deciduous tree, branching readily near its base and with ascending branches that form a dense, broad oval crown. It is also highly drought-resistant, a trait inherited from the desert willow. Chitalpa are also carriers of the Xylella fastidiosa bacterium.

== History ==
The two types of trees called Chitalpa were created as hybrids by A. Rusanov of the Botanic Garden of the Uzbek Academy of Sciences in Uzbekistan (then part of the Soviet Union) in 1964. They were introduced in the US by Robert Hebb of the New York Botanic Garden in 1977. Unbeknownst to the scientist, the Chilopsis used for the hybrid was infected with the bacterial plant pathogen Xylella fastidiosa. Due to the fact that all Chitalpas today were bred from the original root stock, all species have the pathogen. Hebb brought cuttings of two clones and grew them at the Cary Arboretum in Millbrook, N.Y. The cuttings began to flower in the third growing season, showing two color forms. These two forms were distributed in 1982, and all living plants of this intergeneric hybrid in North America are believed to have originated from this single introduction. Although the two forms were later shown to be distinct crosses in Rusanov's experiments, they are both called 'Chitalpa', as Thomas Elias and Walter Wisura from the Rancho Santa Ana Botanic garden created the name and applied it to both types in 1991. The tree is ideally suited to most soils and climates of the southwestern United States.
