= Tetuin =

- Tetuin

Names
- IUPAC name 6-(β-D-Glucopyranosyloxy)-5,7-dihydroxyflavone
- Systematic IUPAC name 5,7-Dihydroxy-2-phenyl-6-{[(2S,3R,4S,5S,6R)-3,4,5-trihydroxy-6-(hydroxymethyl)oxan-2-yl]oxy}-4H-1-benzopyran-4-one
- Other names Baicalein 6-glucoside Baicalein 6-O-glucoside

Identifiers
CAS Number	28279-72-3
3D model (JSmol)	Interactive image
ChemSpider	58802100
PubChem CID	5321896
CompTox Dashboard (EPA)	DTXSID20498465
- InChI: InChI=1S/C21H20O10/c22-8-14-16(25)18(27)19(28)21(30-14)31-20-11(24)7-13-15(17(20)26)10(23)6-12(29-13)9-4-2-1-3-5-9/h1-7,14,16,18-19,21-22,24-28H,8H2/t14-,16-,18+,19-,21+/m1/s1 Key: WTYYPLMAODUDGW-QOUKUZOOSA-N
- SMILES: C1=CC=C(C=C1)C2=CC(=O)C3=C(C(=C(C=C3O2)O)OC4C(C(C(C(O4)CO)O)O)O)O

Properties
Chemical formula	C_{21}H_{20}O_{10}
Molar mass	432.37 g/mol
- Except where otherwise noted, data are given for materials in their standard state (at 25 °C [77 °F], 100 kPa). verify (what is ?) Infobox references

Tetuin is the name originally allocated to a chemical constituent of the seeds of Oroxylum indicum, the Indian trumpetflower, known as टेटु tetu in Marathi. The original authors identified this chemical as the 6-O-glucoside of baicalein, a flavone, a type of flavonoid. Their identification was probably incorrect, as subsequent authors were able to demonstrate that baicalein 6-O-glucoside has different properties to the original tetuin from O. indicum seeds, and were unable to find baicalein glycosides in the seeds. Nevertheless, modern authors have used the name tetuin as a trivial name for baicalein 6-O-glucoside.
