= Pseudonocardia ailaonensis =

Scientific classification
- Domain: Bacteria
- Kingdom: Bacillati
- Phylum: Actinomycetota
- Class: Actinomycetia
- Order: Pseudonocardiales
- Family: Pseudonocardiaceae
- Genus: Pseudonocardia
- Species: P. ailaonensis

Binomial name
- Pseudonocardia ailaonensis Qin et al. 2008

Type strain
- DSM 44979, JCM 16009, KCTC 19315, YIM 45505

Species of bacterium

Pseudonocardia ailaonensis is a bacterium from the genus of Pseudonocardia which has been isolated from forest soil in Yunnan in China.
