= Pseudonocardia chloroethenivorans =

Scientific classification
- Domain: Bacteria
- Kingdom: Bacillati
- Phylum: Actinomycetota
- Class: Actinomycetia
- Order: Pseudonocardiales
- Family: Pseudonocardiaceae
- Genus: Pseudonocardia
- Species: P. chloroethenivorans

Binomial name
- Pseudonocardia chloroethenivorans Lee et al. 2004

Type strain
- ATCC BAA-742, DSM 44698, JCM 12679, SL-1

Species of bacterium

Pseudonocardia chloroethenivorans is a trichloroethene degrading bacterium from the genus of Pseudonocardia.
