= Pseudonocardia xinjiangensis =

Scientific classification
- Domain: Bacteria
- Kingdom: Bacillati
- Phylum: Actinomycetota
- Class: Actinomycetia
- Order: Pseudonocardiales
- Family: Pseudonocardiaceae
- Genus: Pseudonocardia
- Species: P. xinjiangensis

Binomial name
- Pseudonocardia xinjiangensis (Xu et al. 1999) Huang et al. 2002

Type strain
- AS 4.1538, BCRC 16358, CCRC 16358, CCTCC AA97020, CGMCC 4.1538, CIP 107366, DSM 44661, JCM 11839, XJ-45

Synonyms
- Actinobispora xinjiangensis Xu et al. 1999

Species of bacterium

Pseudonocardia xinjiangensis is a bacterium from the genus of Pseudonocardia which has been isolated from soil in China.
