= Pseudonocardia spinosispora =

Scientific classification
- Domain: Bacteria
- Kingdom: Bacillati
- Phylum: Actinomycetota
- Class: Actinomycetia
- Order: Pseudonocardiales
- Family: Pseudonocardiaceae
- Genus: Pseudonocardia
- Species: P. spinosispora

Binomial name
- Pseudonocardia spinosispora Lee et al. 2002

Type strain
- DSM 44797, IMSNU 50581, JCM 11935, KCTC 9991, NRRL B-24156, LM 141

Species of bacterium

Pseudonocardia spinosispora is a bacterium from the genus of Pseudonocardia which has been isolated from soil from a gold mine in Kongju on Korea.
