= Pseudonocardia oroxyli =

Scientific classification
- Domain: Bacteria
- Kingdom: Bacillati
- Phylum: Actinomycetota
- Class: Actinomycetia
- Order: Pseudonocardiales
- Family: Pseudonocardiaceae
- Genus: Pseudonocardia
- Species: P. oroxyli

Binomial name
- Pseudonocardia oroxyli Gu et al. 2006

Species of bacterium

Pseudonocardia oroxyli is a soil-dwelling actinomycete that was isolated from the roots of the South-East Asia tree Oroxylum indicum.
