= Pseudonocardia acaciae =

Scientific classification
- Domain: Bacteria
- Kingdom: Bacillati
- Phylum: Actinomycetota
- Class: Actinomycetia
- Order: Pseudonocardiales
- Family: Pseudonocardiaceae
- Genus: Pseudonocardia
- Species: P. acaciae

Binomial name
- Pseudonocardia acaciae Duangmal et al. 2009

Type strain
- BCC 28481, CIP 110060, GMKU095, JCM 16707, NBRC 104274, NRRL B-24609, TISTR 1862

Species of bacterium

Pseudonocardia acaciae is a Gram-positive bacterium from the genus of Pseudonocardia which has been isolated from roots of the tree Acacia auriculiformis in Bangkok on Thailand.
