= Pseudonocardia cypriaca =

Scientific classification
- Domain: Bacteria
- Kingdom: Bacillati
- Phylum: Actinomycetota
- Class: Actinomycetia
- Order: Pseudonocardiales
- Family: Pseudonocardiaceae
- Genus: Pseudonocardia
- Species: P. cypriaca

Binomial name
- Pseudonocardia cypriaca Sahin et al. 2014

Type strain
- DSM 45511, KCTC 29067, KT2142, NRRL B-24882

Species of bacterium

Pseudonocardia cypriaca is a bacterium from the genus of Pseudonocardia which has been isolated from soil.
