= Pseudonocardia yunnanensis =

Scientific classification
- Domain: Bacteria
- Kingdom: Bacillati
- Phylum: Actinomycetota
- Class: Actinomycetia
- Order: Pseudonocardiales
- Family: Pseudonocardiaceae
- Genus: Pseudonocardia
- Species: P. yunnanensis

Binomial name
- Pseudonocardia yunnanensis (Jiang et al. 1991) Huang et al. 2002

Type strain
- AS 4.1333, AS 4.1542, BCRC 16359, CCRC 16359, CCTCC AA90959, CCTCC M-90959, CGMCC 4.1542, DSM 44253, IFO 15681, IMSNU 22019, JCM 9330, NBRC 15681, VKM Ac-1991, Y-11981

Synonyms
- Actinobispora yunnanensis Jiang et al. 1991

Species of bacterium

Pseudonocardia yunnanensis is a bacterium from the genus of Pseudonocardia.
