= Pseudonocardia dioxanivorans =

Scientific classification
- Domain: Bacteria
- Kingdom: Bacillati
- Phylum: Actinomycetota
- Class: Actinomycetia
- Order: Pseudonocardiales
- Family: Pseudonocardiaceae
- Genus: Pseudonocardia
- Species: P. dioxanivorans

Binomial name
- Pseudonocardia dioxanivorans Mahendra and Alvarez-Cohen 2005

Type strain
- Am, ATCC 55486, CB1190, DSM 44775, JCM 13855

Species of bacterium

Pseudonocardia dioxanivorans is a Gram-positive bacterium from the genus of Pseudonocardia which has been isolated from industrial sludge which was contaminated with 1,4-dioxane in the United States.
