= Pseudonocardia autotrophica =

Scientific classification
- Domain: Bacteria
- Kingdom: Bacillati
- Phylum: Actinomycetota
- Class: Actinomycetes
- Order: Pseudonocardiales
- Family: Pseudonocardiaceae
- Genus: Pseudonocardia
- Species: P. autotrophica

Binomial name
- Pseudonocardia autotrophica (Takamiya and Tubaki 1956) Warwick et al. 1994

Type strain
- aa-1-1, Antibióticos S.A. 2CG-256, AS 4.1211, ATCC 19727, BCRC 12444, CBS 466.68, CCM 2750, CCRC 12444, CECT 3301, CECT 7671, CGMCC 4.1211, CGMCC 4.1297, CIP 107114, DSM 40011, DSM 43210, DSM 535, Hirsch 394, IFO 12743, IMET 7646, IMRU 1595, IMSNU 11005, IMSNU 20050, ISP 5011, JCM 4348, KCC S-0348, KCCS-0348, KCCS-0348KODAI394, KCTC 1816, KCTC 9300, KCTC 9564, KCTC 9574, Kodai 394, NBRC 12743, NCIB 9810, NCIMB 9810, NRRL B-11275, RIA 1008, VKM Ac-941

Synonyms
- Amycolata autotrophica (Takamiya and Tubaki 1956) Lechevalier et al. 1986; Nocardia autotrophica (Takamiya and Tubaki 1956) Hirsch 1961 (Approved Lists 1980); "Proactinomyces autotrophicus" (Takamiya and Tubaki 1956) Kuznetsov et al. 1978; "Streptomyces autotrophicus" Takamiya and Tubaki 1956

Species of bacterium

Pseudonocardia autotrophica is a bacterium from the genus Pseudonocardia. Pseudonocardia autotrophica produces antifungal compounds.
