= Nyctocalos =

Scientific classification
- Kingdom: Plantae
- Clade: Tracheophytes
- Clade: Angiosperms
- Clade: Eudicots
- Clade: Asterids
- Order: Lamiales
- Family: Bignoniaceae
- Tribe: Oroxyleae
- Genus: Nyctocalos; Teijsm. & Binn.

Genus of plants

Nyctocalos is a genus of flowering plants belonging to the family Bignoniaceae.

Its native range is South-Central China to Malesia.

== Species ==
Plants of the World Online includes:

- Nyctocalos brunfelsiiflorum Teijsm. & Binn. (synonym N. shanica R.W.MacGregor & W.W.Sm.)
- Nyctocalos cuspidatum (Blume) Miq.
- Nyctocalos pinnatum Steenis
