= Pseudonocardia antarctica =

Scientific classification
- Domain: Bacteria
- Kingdom: Bacillati
- Phylum: Actinomycetota
- Class: Actinomycetia
- Order: Pseudonocardiales
- Family: Pseudonocardiaceae
- Genus: Pseudonocardia
- Species: P. antarctica

Binomial name
- Pseudonocardia antarctica Prabahar et al. 2004

Type strain
- CIP 108584, DSM 44749, DVS 5a1, JCM 12172, MTCC 4297

Species of bacterium

Pseudonocardia antarctica is a bacterium from the genus of Pseudonocardia which has been isolated from soil from the McMurdo Dry Valleys from the Antarctica.
