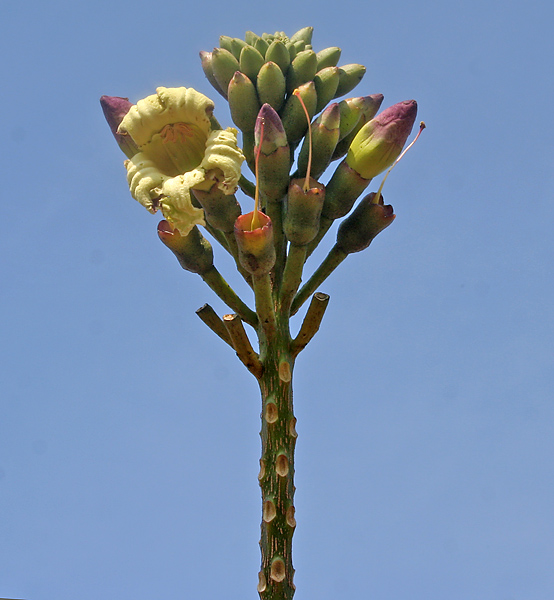
- Oroxylum indicum

Scientific classification
- Kingdom: Plantae
- Clade: Tracheophytes
- Clade: Angiosperms
- Clade: Eudicots
- Clade: Asterids
- Order: Lamiales
- Family: Bignoniaceae
- Tribe: Oroxyleae; A.H.Gentry ex Reveal & L.G.Lohmann (2012)

= Oroxyleae =

Tribe of trees

Oroxyleae is a tribe of trees in the family Bignoniaceae: typically found in Asia.

== Genera ==
Four genera are currently recognised:

1. Hieris Steenis - monotypic Hieris curtisii (Ridl.) Steenis
2. Millingtonia L. f. (synonym Nevrilis Raf.) - monotypic
3. Nyctocalos Teijsm. & Binn.
4. Oroxylum Vent. (synonyms: Calosanthes Blume & Hippoxylon Raf.) - monotypic Oroxylum indicum (L.) Kurz
