= Pseudonocardia alni =

Scientific classification
- Domain: Bacteria
- Kingdom: Bacillati
- Phylum: Actinomycetota
- Class: Actinomycetia
- Order: Pseudonocardiales
- Family: Pseudonocardiaceae
- Genus: Pseudonocardia
- Species: P. alni

Binomial name
- Pseudonocardia alni (Evtushenko et al. 1989) Warwick et al. 1994

Type strain
- 3LS, CGMCC 4.1531, DSM 44104, IFO 14991, IMSNU 20049, JCM 9103, KCTC 9691, NBRC 14991, VKM Ac-901

Synonyms
- Amycolata alni Evtushenko et al. 1989

Species of bacterium

Pseudonocardia alni is a bacterium from the genus of Pseudonocardia which has been isolated from the roots of the tree Alnus incana.
