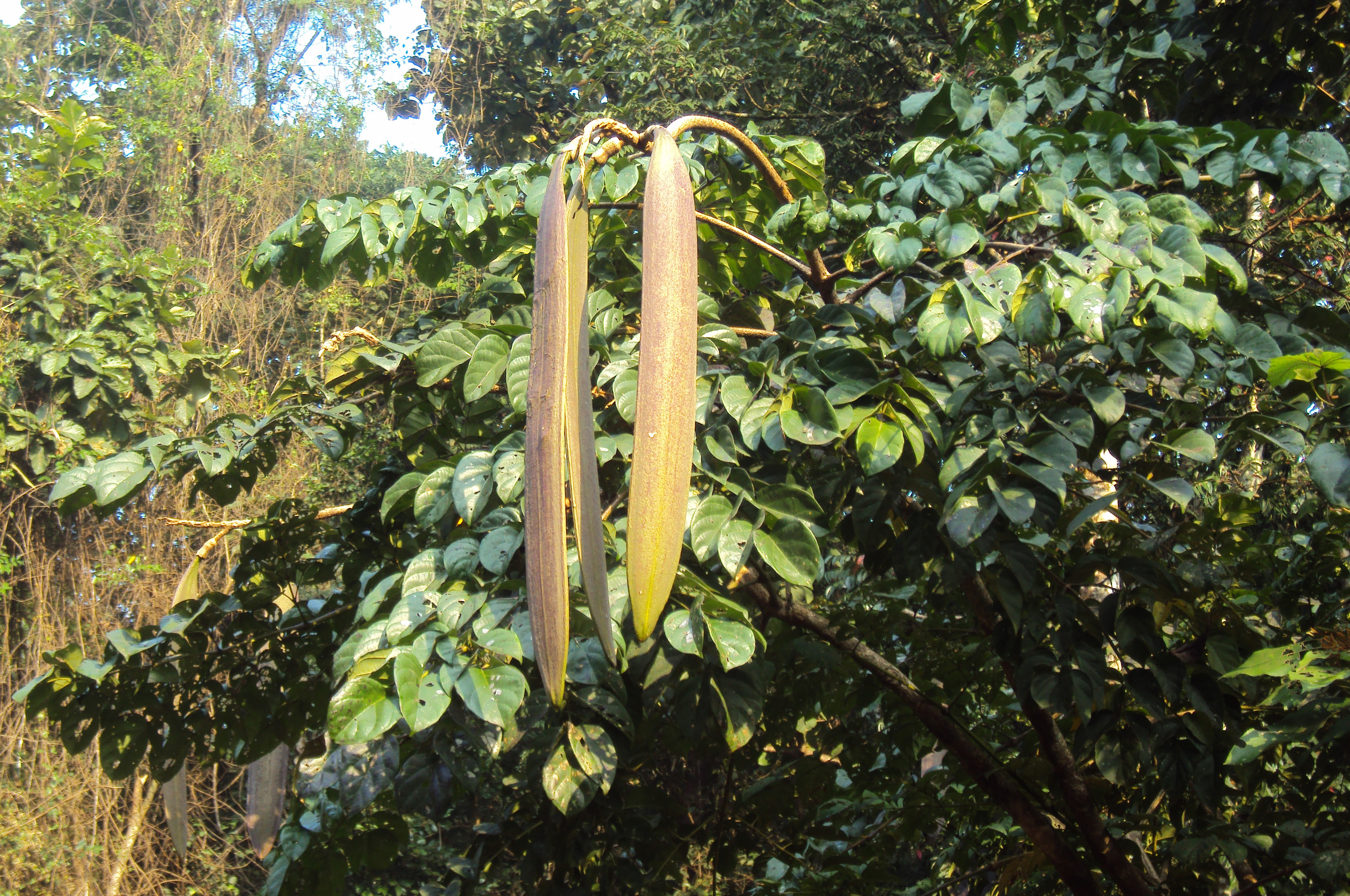
- Leaves and fruit, at Muzhakkunnu in Kerala, India

Scientific classification
- Kingdom: Plantae
- Clade: Tracheophytes
- Clade: Angiosperms
- Clade: Eudicots
- Clade: Asterids
- Order: Lamiales
- Family: Bignoniaceae
- Tribe: Oroxyleae
- Genus: Oroxylum; Vent.
- Species: O. indicum

Binomial name
- Oroxylum indicum (L.) Benth. ex Kurz

Synonyms
- List: Arthrophyllum ceylanicum Miq.; Arthrophyllum reticulatum Blume ex Miq.; Bignonia indica L.; Bignonia lugubris Salisb.; Bignonia pentandra Lour.; Bignonia quadripinnata Blanco; Bignonia tripinnata Noronha; Bignonia tuberculata Roxb. ex DC.; Calosanthes indica (L.) Blume; Hippoxylon indica (L.) Raf.; Oroxylum flavum Rehder; Oroxylum indicum Vent. nom. inval.; Spathodea indica (L.) Pers.

= Oroxylum =

Species of tree

Oroxylum indicum is a species of flowering plant, in the monotypic genus Oroxylum in the family Bignoniaceae. It is commonly called Indian trumpet tree, oroxylum, Indian trumpet flower, broken bones, scythe tree, tree of Damocles, or midnight horror. It can reach a height of 18 metres (59 ft). Various segments of the tree are used in traditional medicine.

== Taxonomy ==
Genetic analysis suggests the closest relative of Oroxylum is the genus Millingtonia; this pair of genera are then probably next most closely related to a clade containing Catalpa and Chilopsis.

== Etymology ==
Its genus name Oroxylum comes from Greek words ὄρος oros 'mountain' and ξύλον xylon 'wood', and its epithet means "from India".

== Description ==
The tree grows up to 27 m (89 ft) tall with a trunk diameter of 10–40 cm (3.9–15.7 in) with grey bark. A mature tree has few branches growing large pinnate leaves, which are the largest of all dicot tree leaves. The blade, or lamina can be as much as 2.2 m (7 ft 3 in) long by 2.2 m (7 ft 3 in) wide. Each leaf stalk, or petiole, is up to 2 m (6.6 ft) long comprising four pinnate branches, each branch is approximately 1 m (3.3 ft) in length and comparably wide, borne on petioles or stalks. All parts of the leaflet stalk grow at once, with dead stalks falling off the tree and collecting near the base of the trunk, looking like a pile of broken limb bones.

The flowers grow from long pedicels at the end of 2-4 cm long racemes, their brown or dirty-violet calyxes are leathery. They have a sharp smell and bloom at night to attract pollination by bats. They form enormous seed pods; these are up to 1.5 m (4.9 ft) long that hang down from bare branches, resembling swords. The long fruit curve downward and resemble the wings of a large bird or dangling sickles or swords in the night, giving the name "tree of Damocles". The seeds are round with papery wings.

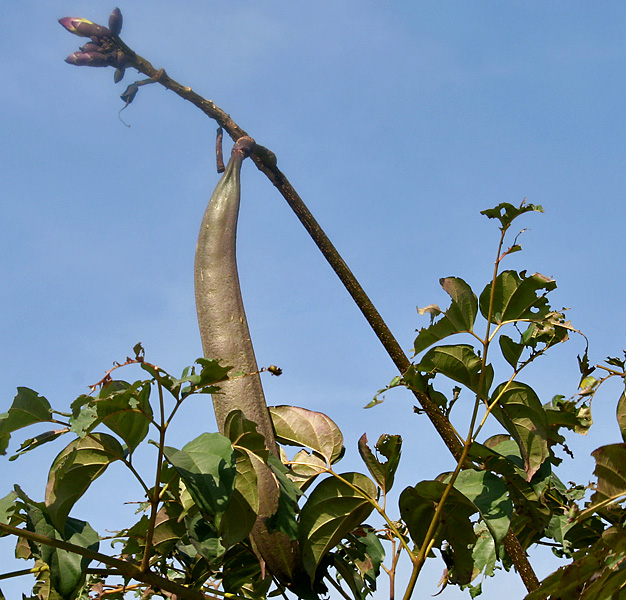
Fruit

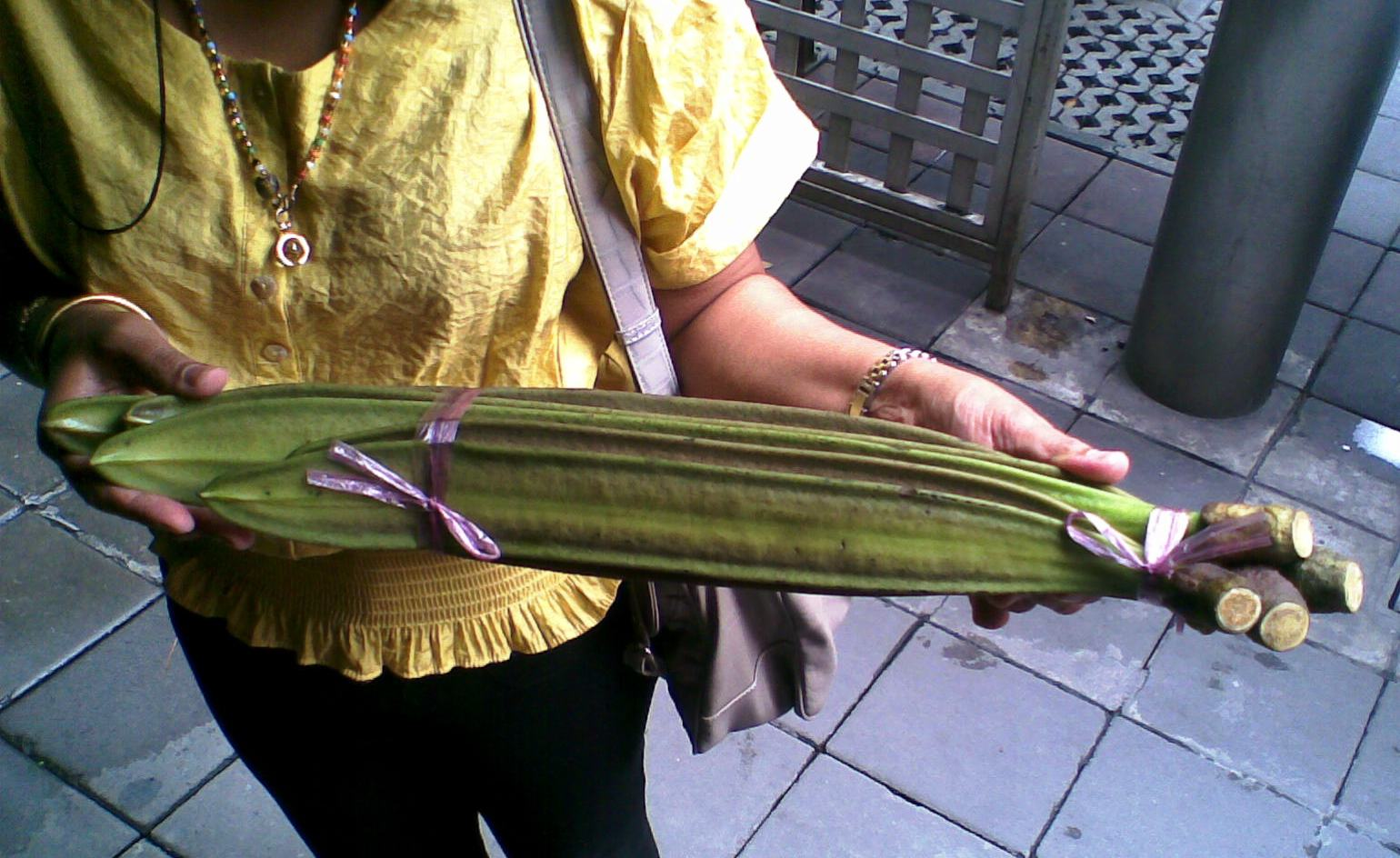
Large Oroxylum pods sold at a market in Bangkok, Thailand

== Distribution ==
Oroxylum indicum is native to the Indian subcontinent, the Himalayan foothills with a part extending to Bhutan and southern China, Indochina and the Malesia regions. In Vietnam, the tree is called núc nác (sometimes sò đo), and specimens can be found in Cat Tien National Park.

It is visible in the forest biome of Manas National Park in Assam, India. It is found, raised and planted in large number in the forest areas of the Banswara district in the state of Rajasthan in India. It is reported in the list of rare, endangered and threatened plants of Kerala (South India). It is also found in Sri Lanka and also in Mizoram.

== Ecology ==
Oroxylum indicum lives in relationship with the actinomycete Pseudonocardia oroxyli present in the soil surrounding the roots. Septobasidium bogoriense is a fungal species responsible for velvet blight in O. indicum.

== Phytochemistry ==
Various segments of O. indicum, including leaves, root bark, heartwood, and seeds, contain diverse phytochemicals, such as prunetin, sitosterol, oroxindin, oroxylin-A, biochanin-A, ellagic acid, tetuin, anthraquinone, and emodin. Several of the compounds are under preliminary research to identify their potential biological properties.

== Uses ==
The tree is often grown as an ornamental plant for its strange appearance. Materials used include the wood, tannins and dyestuffs.

=== In marriage rituals ===
The plant is used by the Kirat, Sunuwar, Rai, Limbu, Yakha, Tamang in Nepal, the Thai in Thailand and the Lao in Laos.

In the Himalayas, people hang sculptures or garlands made from O. indicum (Skr. shyonaka) seeds from the roof of their homes in belief they provide protection.

=== Culinary uses ===
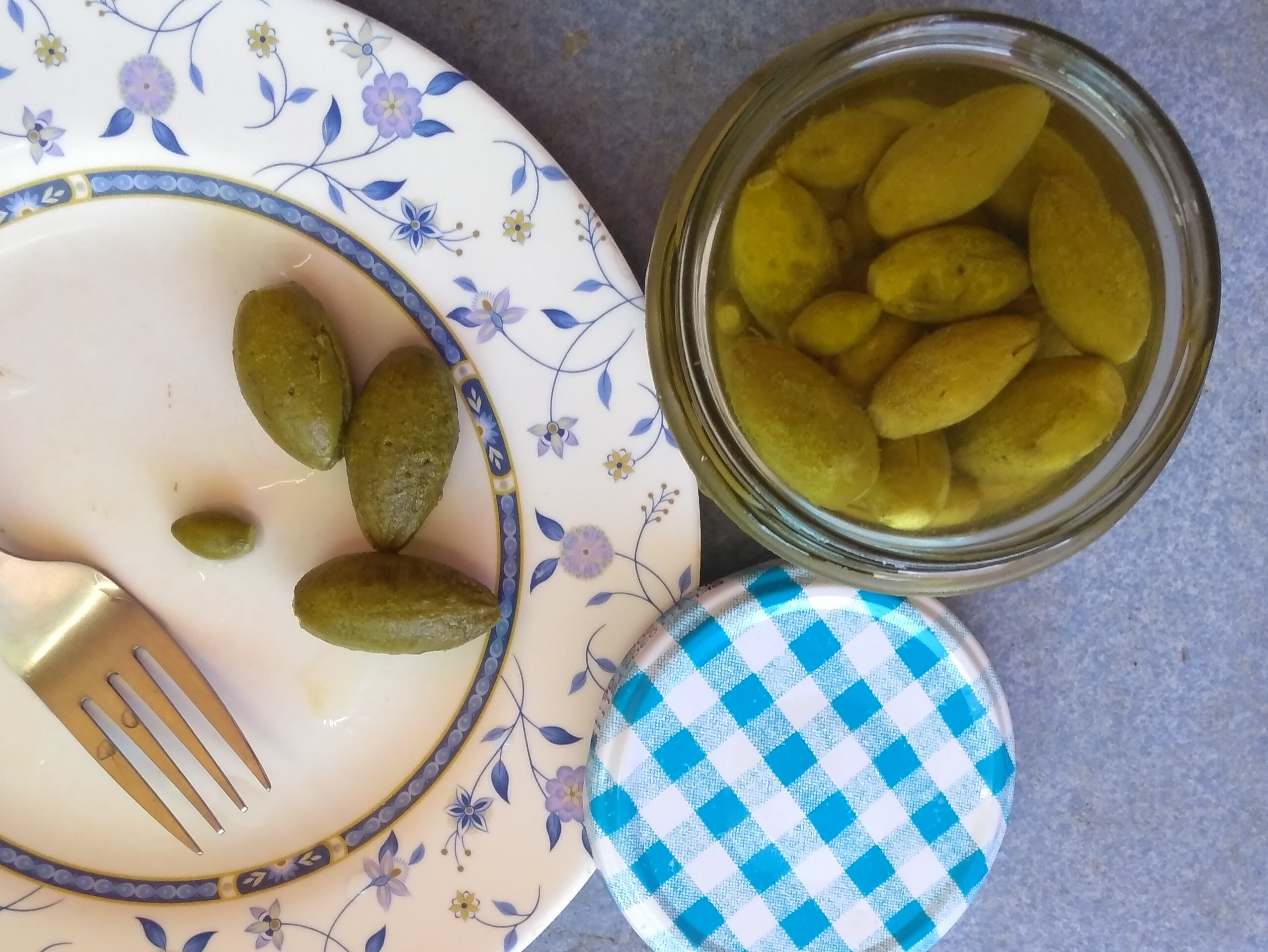
Pickled caper-like flower buds of the scythe tree

It is a plant with edible leaves, flower buds, pods and stems. The large young pods, known as Lin mai or Lin fa in Loei, are eaten especially in Thailand and Laos. They are first grilled over charcoal fire and then the inner tender seeds are usually scraped and eaten along with lap.

Known as karongkandai among the Bodos of northeastern India, oroxylum flowers and fruit are eaten as a bitter side dish with rice. Its fruit are eaten as a side dish, and water of boiled leaves and bark is used as a traditional medicine in Mizoram. It is known in Mizoram as Archangkawm. It is often prepared with fermented or dried fish and believed by them to have medicinal uses. The pods ("Hona Gulo 𑄦𑄧𑄚 𑄉𑄪𑄣𑄮" in the Chakma language) are also eaten by Chakma people in Chittagong hill tracts of Bangladesh and India.

The plant is used as food by the Karen people. The flower buds are boiled and pickled. The young pods are cut open raw and the tender seeds inside are used in various local dishes.

=== In traditional medicine ===
Oroxylum indicum seeds are used in traditional Indian Ayurvedic and Chinese medicines. Root bark is one of the ingredients thought to be useful in compound formulations in Ayurveda and other folk remedies.

=== In art ===
Kelantanese and Javanese peoples forge a type of keris in the shape of the plant's seed pod called the keris buah beko.

== In mythology ==
Because the pods are shaped like swords, people in West Java believe planting Oroxylum trees can protect their homes from thieves.

The Onge name for the tree is talaralu. According to an Onge myth, the first of the Onge people, also named Onge, was created by Eyuge (monitor lizard) from Oroxylum wood. Onge made a shelter and planted Oroxylum trees around it, and created more human beings from the trees. The trees were planted in pairs, giving rise to both Onge men and women. Only Onge people were created in this way; Onge mythology offers no explanation for the existence of non-indigenous people or other indigenous Andamanese peoples.

== Gallery ==
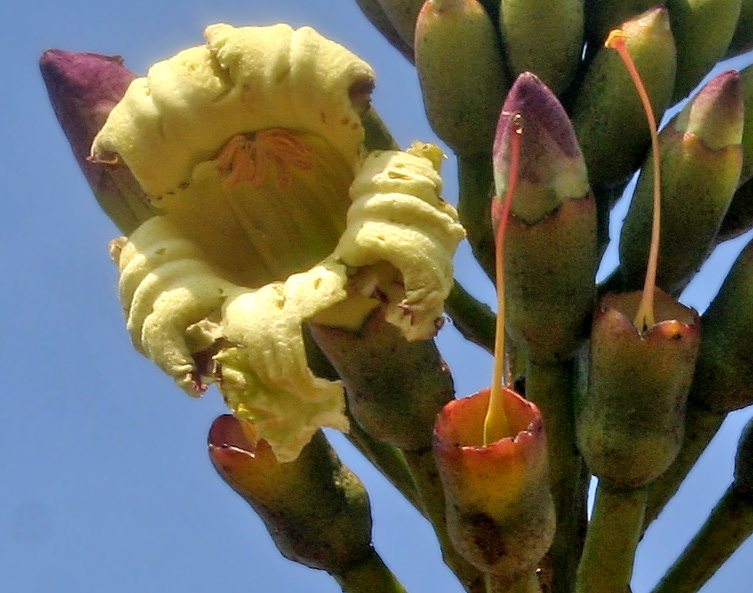
Flowers

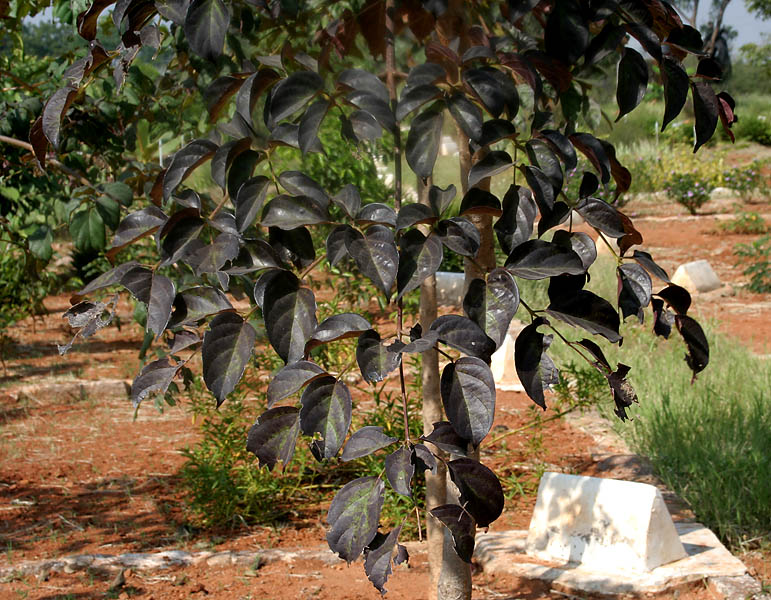
Leaves

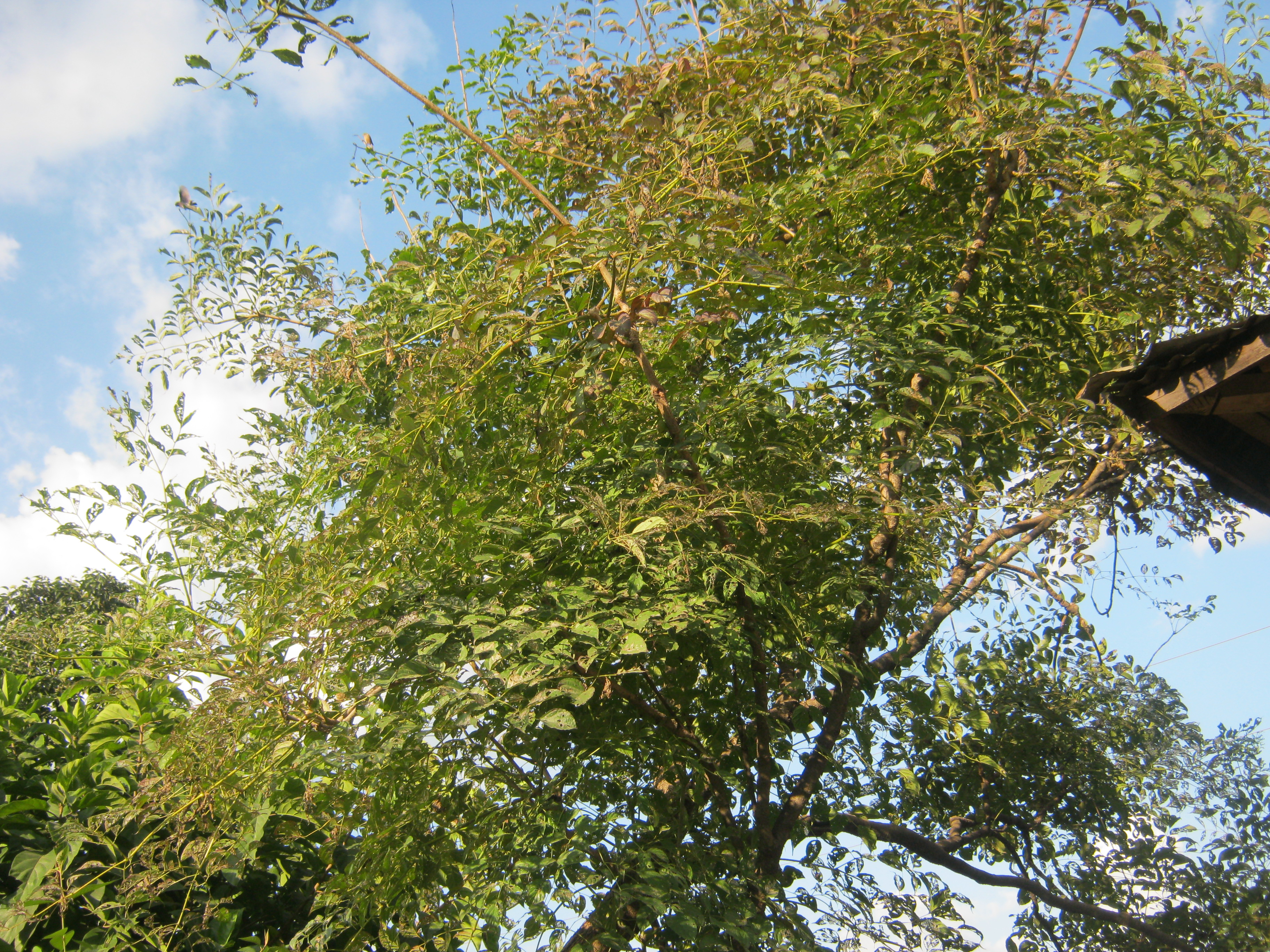
Oroxylum indicum near Panchkhal, Nepal

== See also ==
- List of Thai ingredients
