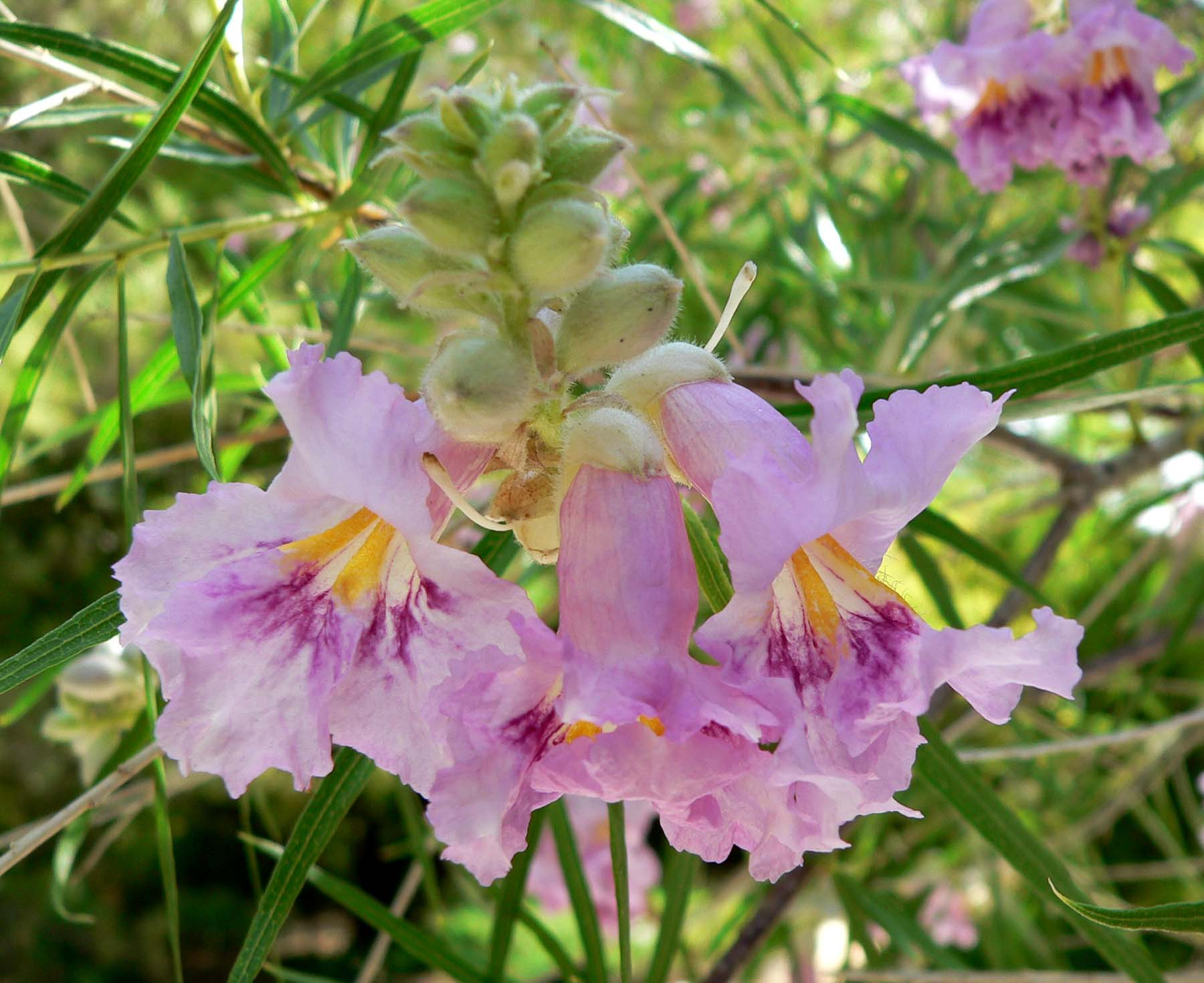

Scientific classification
- Kingdom: Plantae
- Clade: Tracheophytes
- Clade: Angiosperms
- Clade: Eudicots
- Clade: Asterids
- Order: Lamiales
- Family: Bignoniaceae
- Tribe: Catalpeae
- Genus: Chilopsis; D.Don
- Species: C. linearis

Binomial name
- Chilopsis linearis (Cav.) Sweet
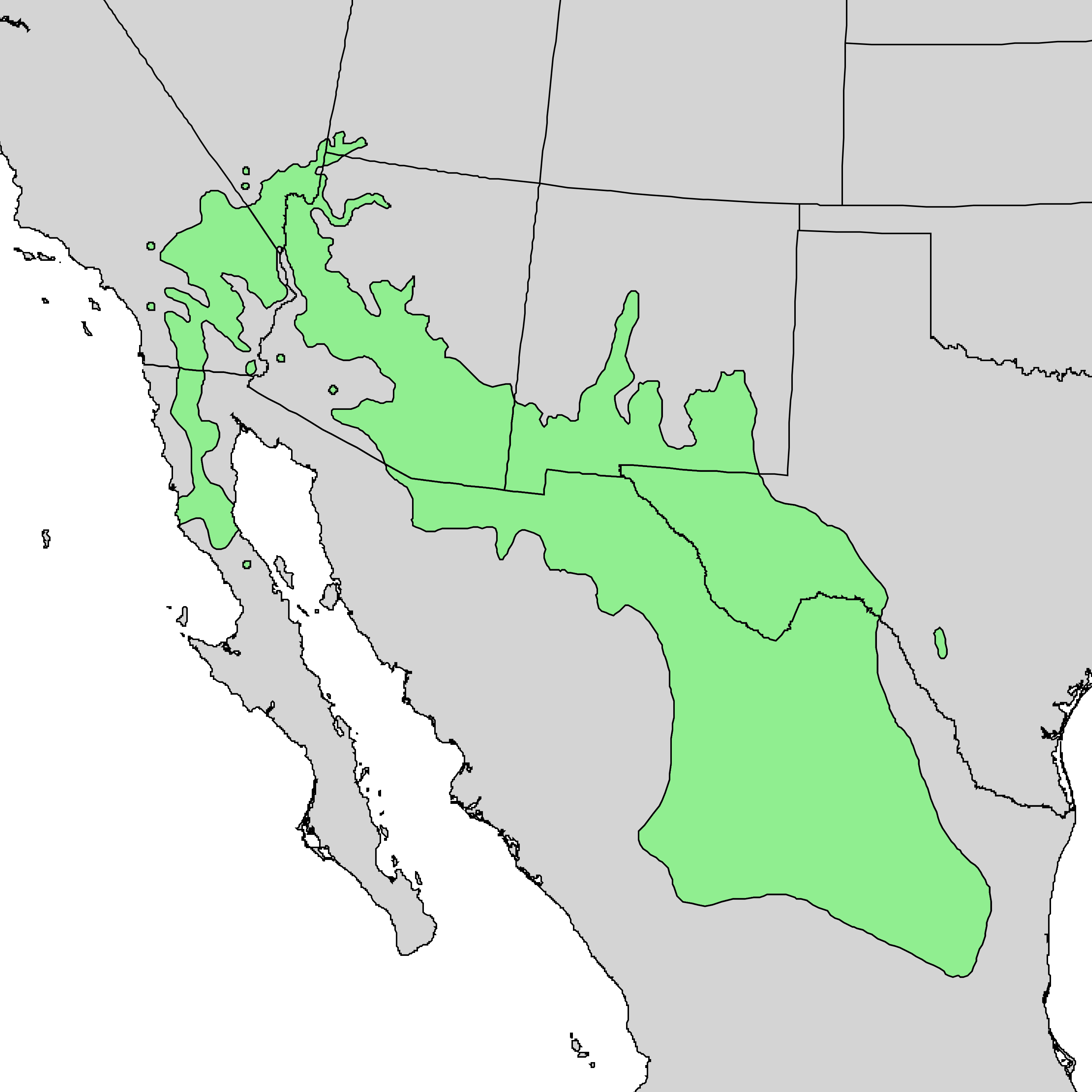
- Natural range of Chilopsis linearis

Synonyms
- Bignonia linearis Cav. Chilopsis saligna D.Don

= Chilopsis =

Genus of plant with a single species

Chilopsis is a monotypic genus of flowering plants containing the single species Chilopsis linearis. It is known commonly as desert willow or desert-willow because of its willow-like leaves, but it is not a true willow – being instead a member of the catalpa family.

It is a shrub or tree native to the southwestern United States and Mexico. It is commonly seen in arroyos and along riverbanks.

== Description ==
Growing up to 9 metres (29 1/2 ft) in height, it can take the form of a shrub or small tree. The linear, curved, deciduous leaves are up to 30 centimetres (12 in) long and just a few millimetres wide.

Blooming from April through September, the flowers occur in a terminal panicle or raceme. About two to four flowers at a time are open in each inflorescence. The calyx is about 8–14 mm (3/8–1/2 in), slightly inflated, and varying shades of purple, while the corolla is 2–5 cm (3/4–2 in), with colors ranging from lavender to light pink. The throat and lower lip has a pattern of yellow ridges and purple lines, and the margins are crinkled. The fruit is a linear pod up to 30 cm (12 in) long, containing numerous winged seeds.

There are two subspecies:

- Chilopsis linearis subsp. linearis. Utah, Arizona, New Mexico, western Texas, Mexico.
- Chilopsis linearis subsp. arcuata. Nevada, California, Baja California.

== Etymology ==
The generic name is derived from the Greek words χεῖλος, (cheilos), meaning "lip," and ὄψις (opsis), meaning "resembling," referring to the flowers.

== Distribution and habitat ==
As a phreatophyte, it is well adapted to ephemeral desert washes and sandy streams. It can be found through much of the southwestern United States and northern Mexico. It is usually found below 1,500 m (5,000 ft).

== Ecology ==
The species is pollinated primarily by large bees in the family Apidae, such as carpenter bees, bumblebees, Anthophora, and Centris. The flowers are popular with hummingbirds as well.

== Cultivation ==
Chilopsis linearis is cultivated for its large, showy flowers, and tolerance of hot, dry climates. Although the natural growth is a very irregular shape, it can be readily pruned into a conventional tree shape. A number of cultivars have been selected. Some, such as 'Rio Salado', have dark purple or magenta flowers.

Chilopsis may survive temperatures as low as 10 degrees F (-12 °C).

Chilopsis is closely related to the genus Catalpa and hybrids can be made between the two genera. The nothogeneric hybrid between Chilopsis linearis and Catalpa bignonioides has been named × Chitalpa tashkentensis. It originated in a botanic garden at Tashkent in Uzbekistan.

== Uses ==
Parts of the plant have been used in traditional medicine. It has been used to treat fungal infections such as candidiasis and athlete's foot, as well as wounds and cough.

The wood was used to make bows and baskets.

== Gallery ==
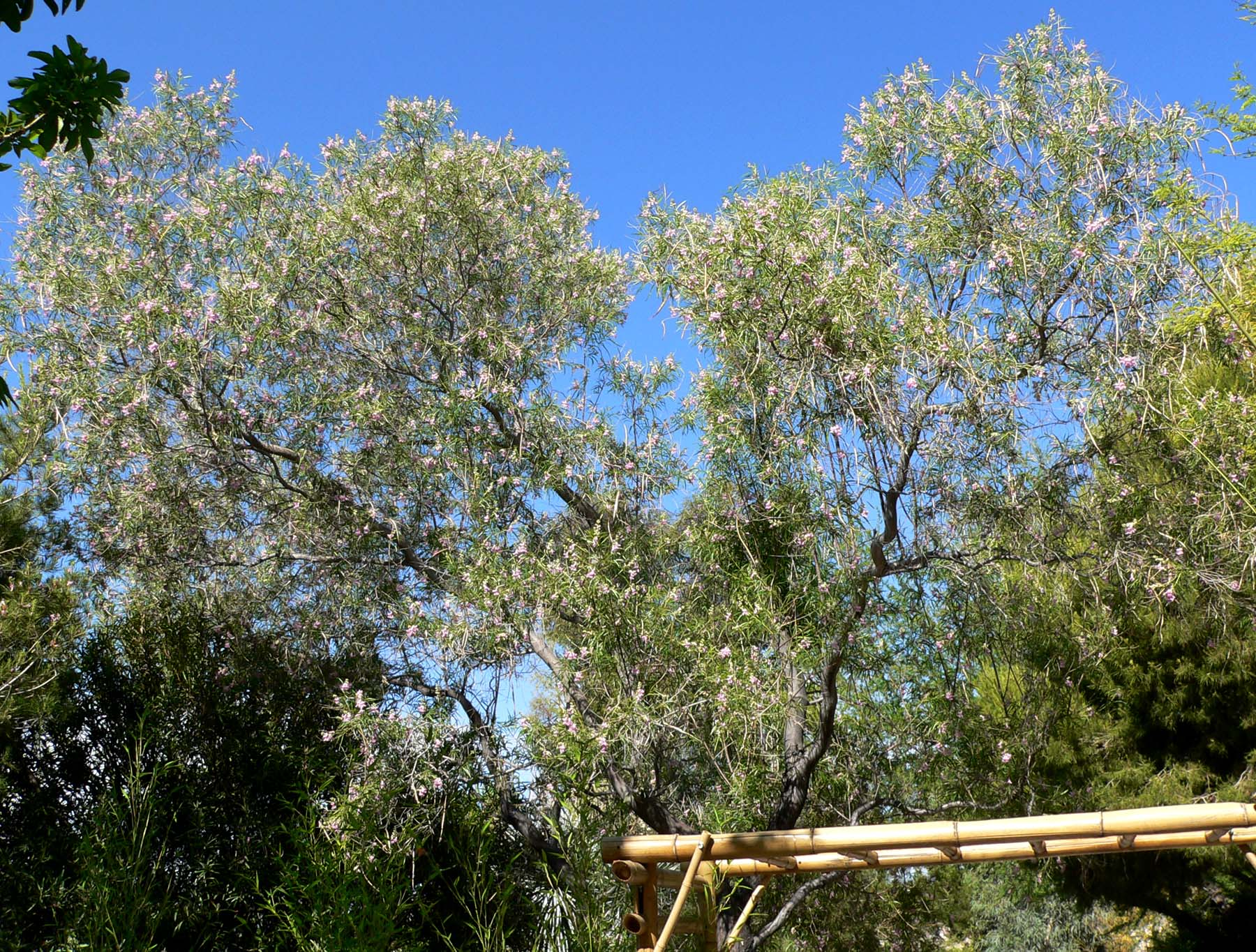
Habit

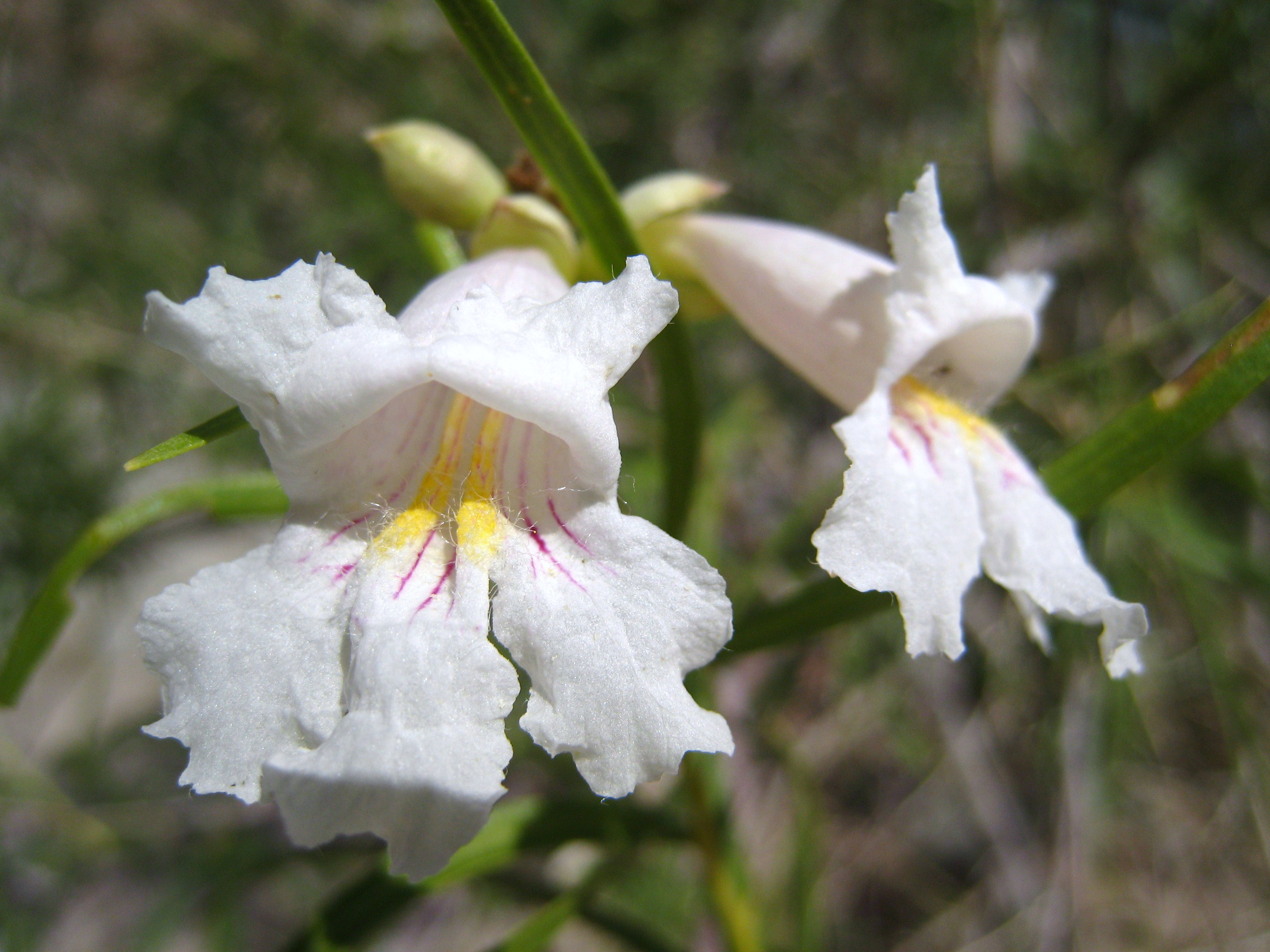
C. linearis subsp. arcuata

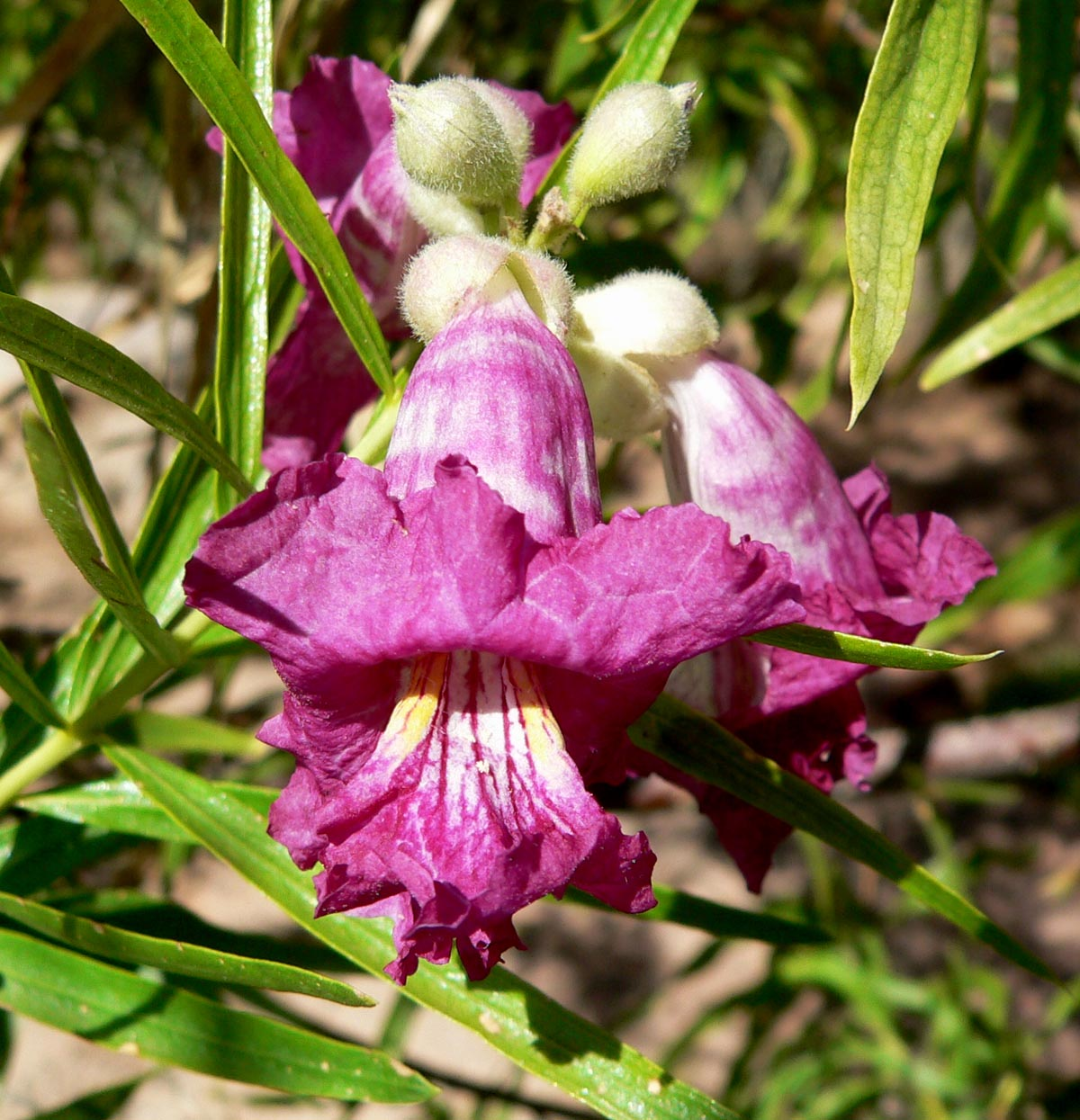
'Rio Salado'
