= List of honey plants =

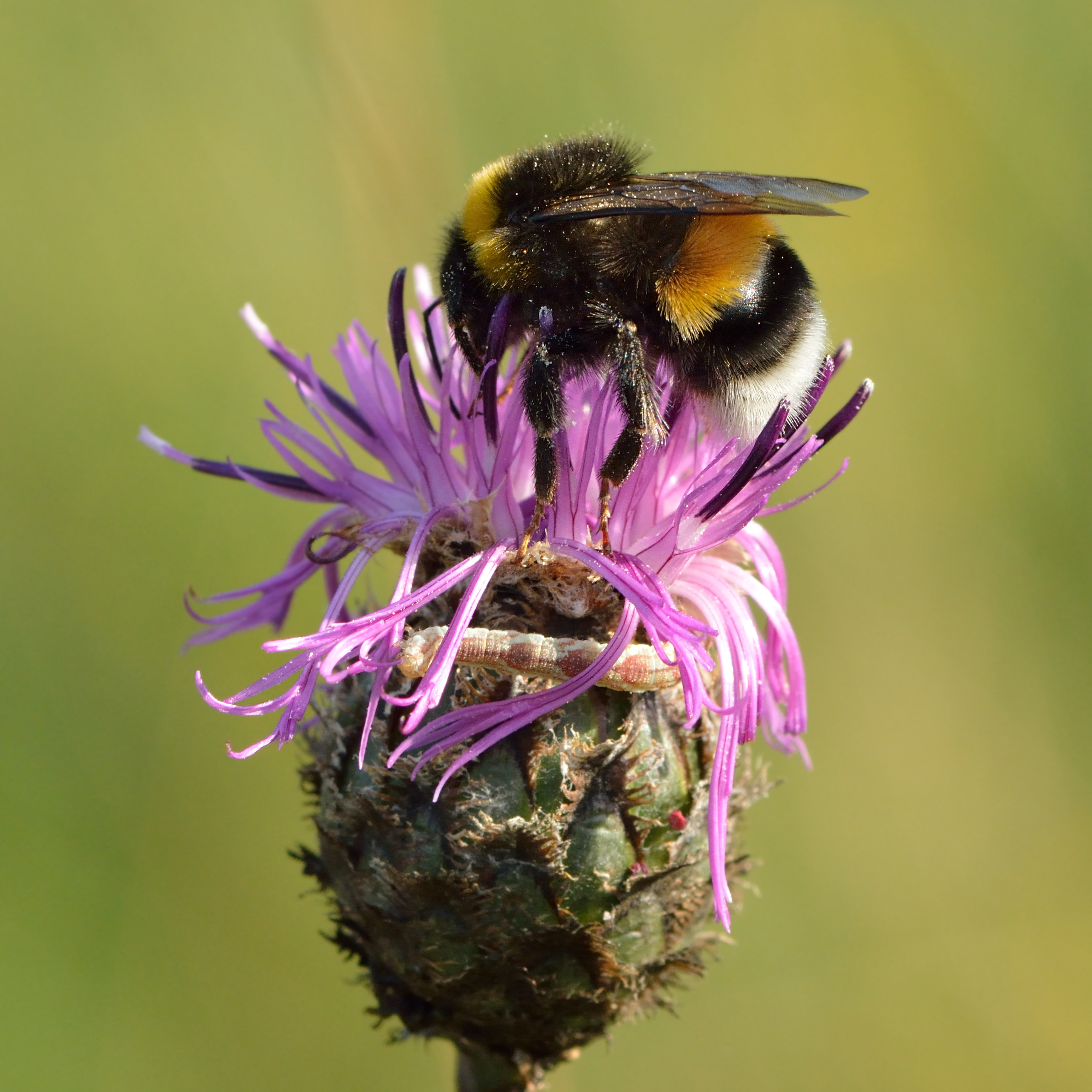
Centaurea scabiosa

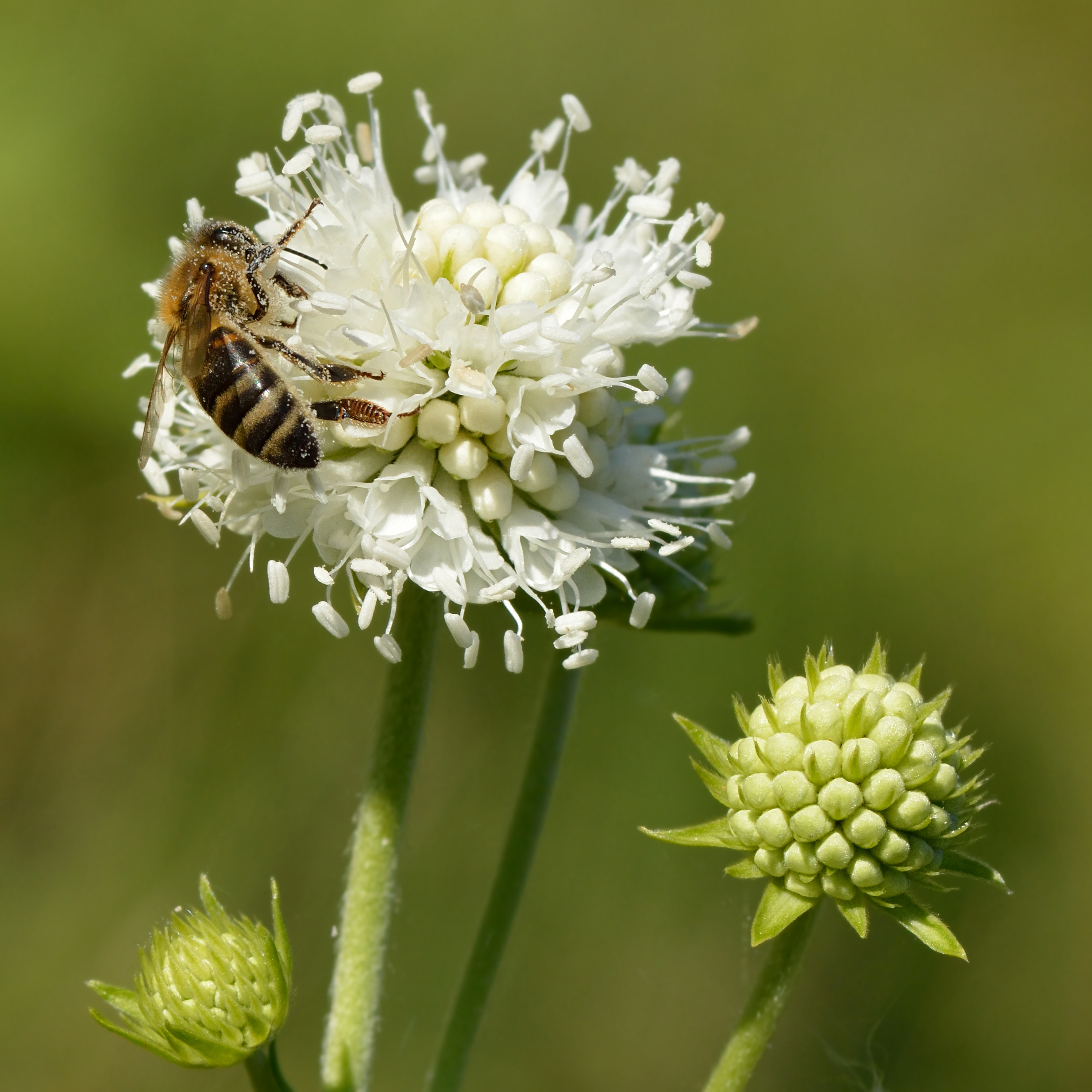
Succisa pratensis

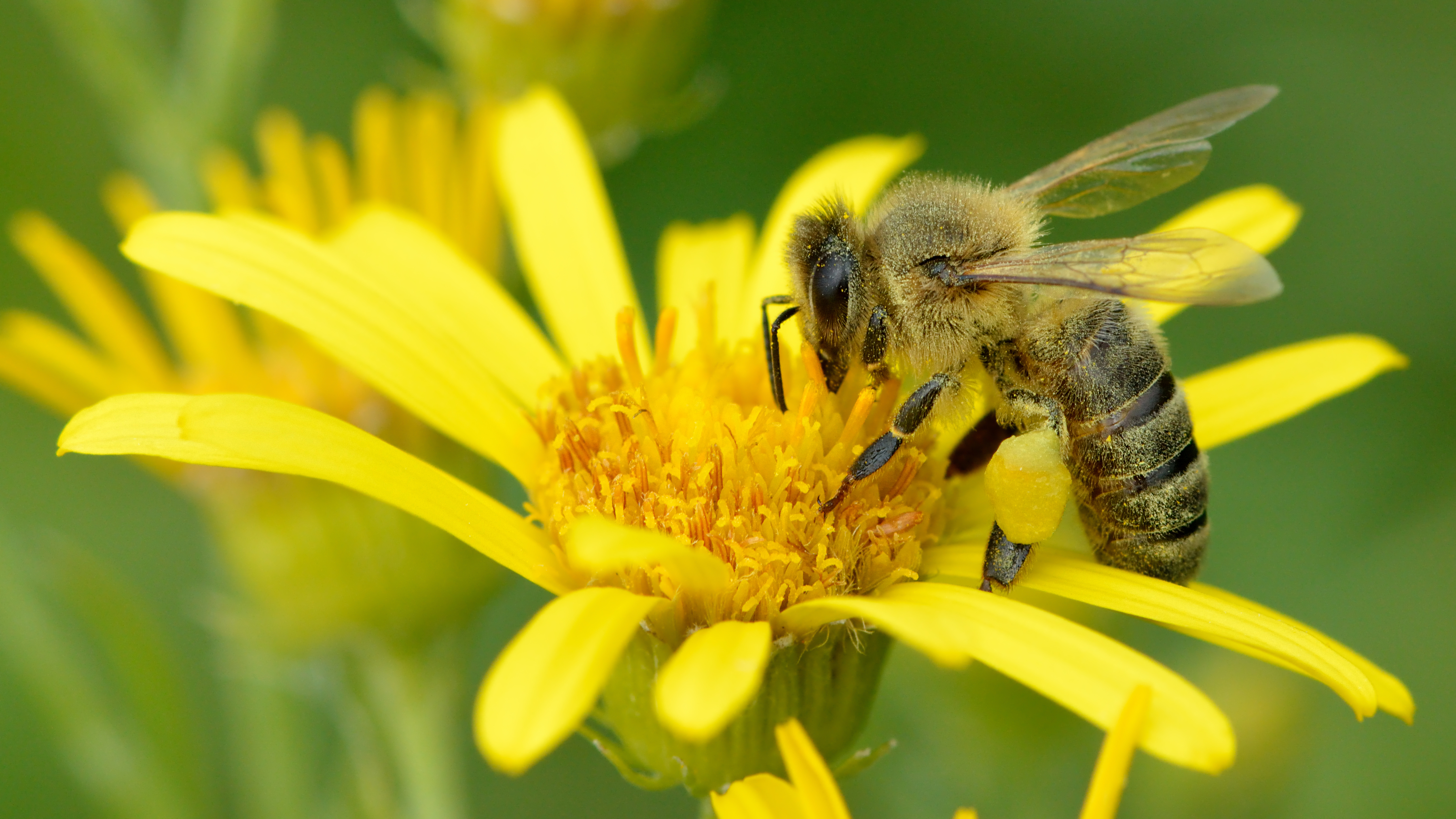
Jacobaea paludosa

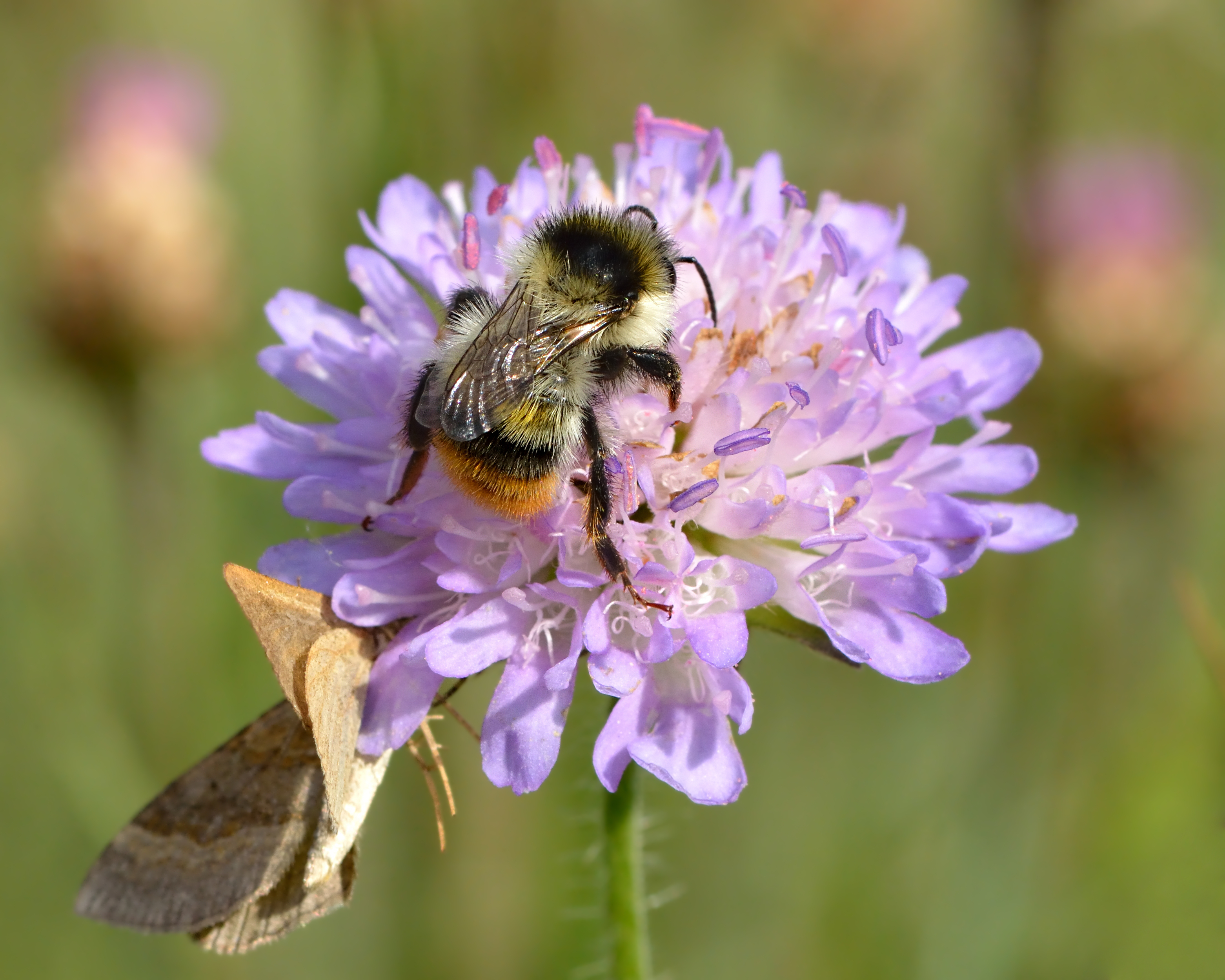
Knautia arvensis

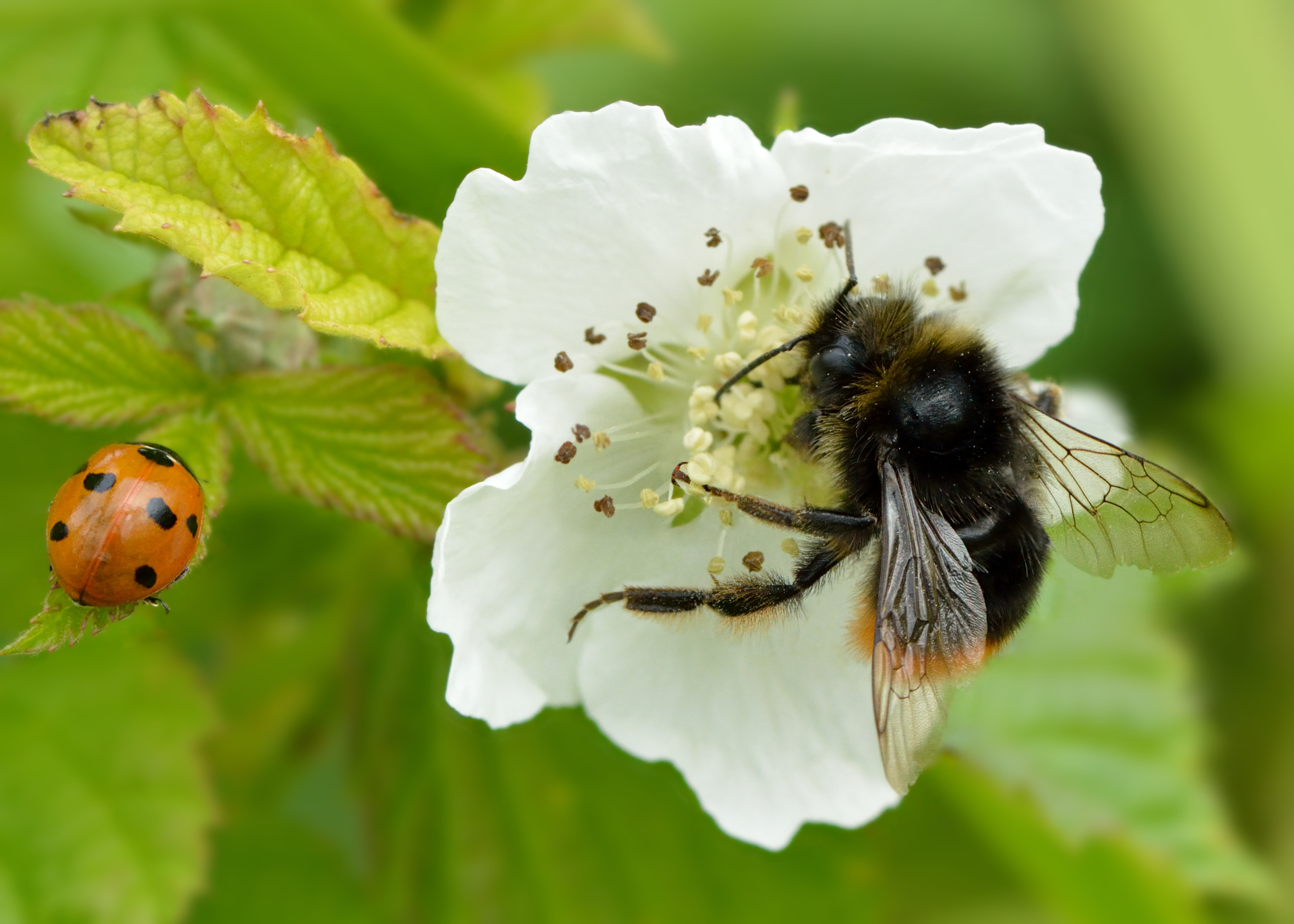
Rubus caesius

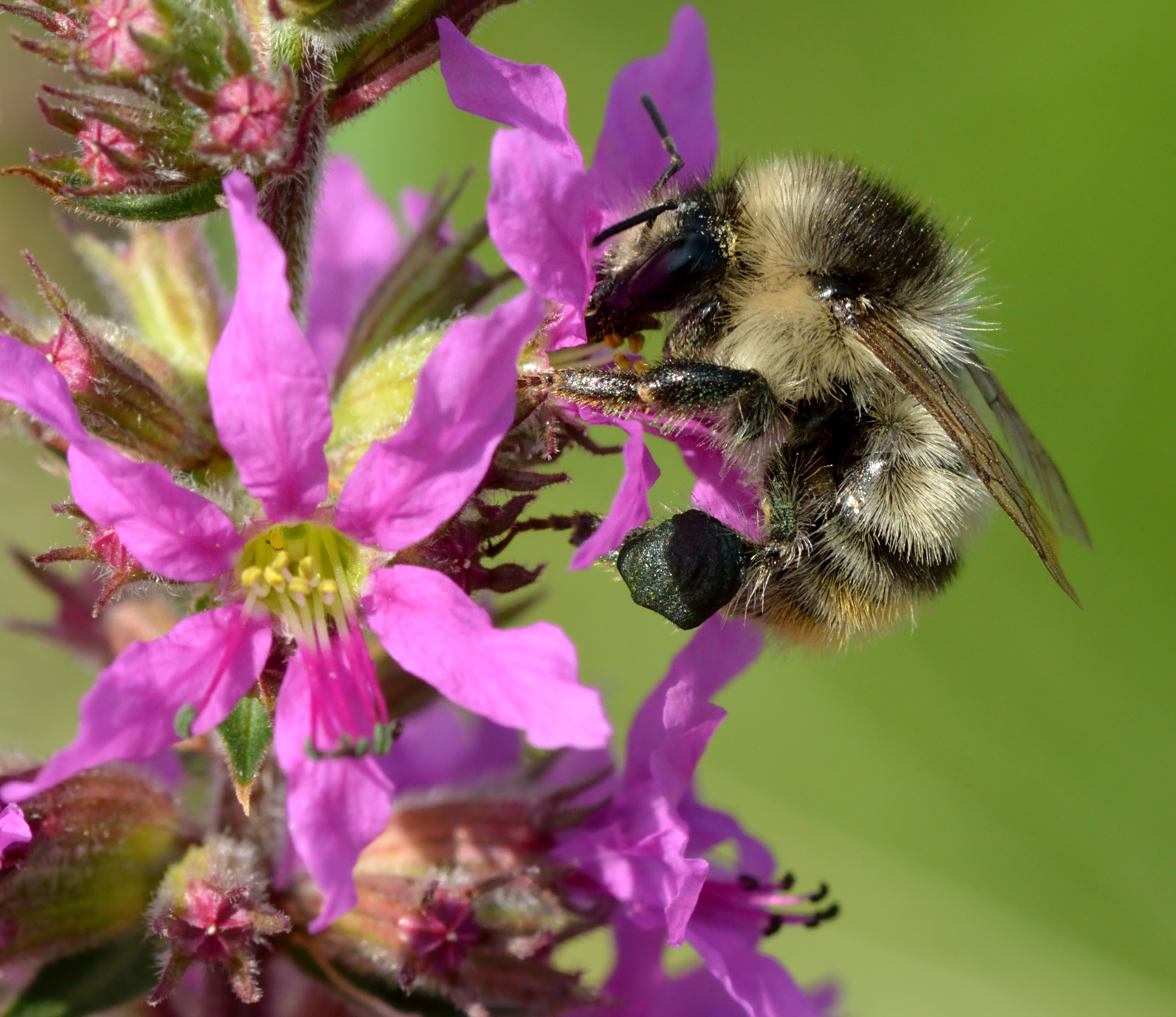
Lythrum salicaria

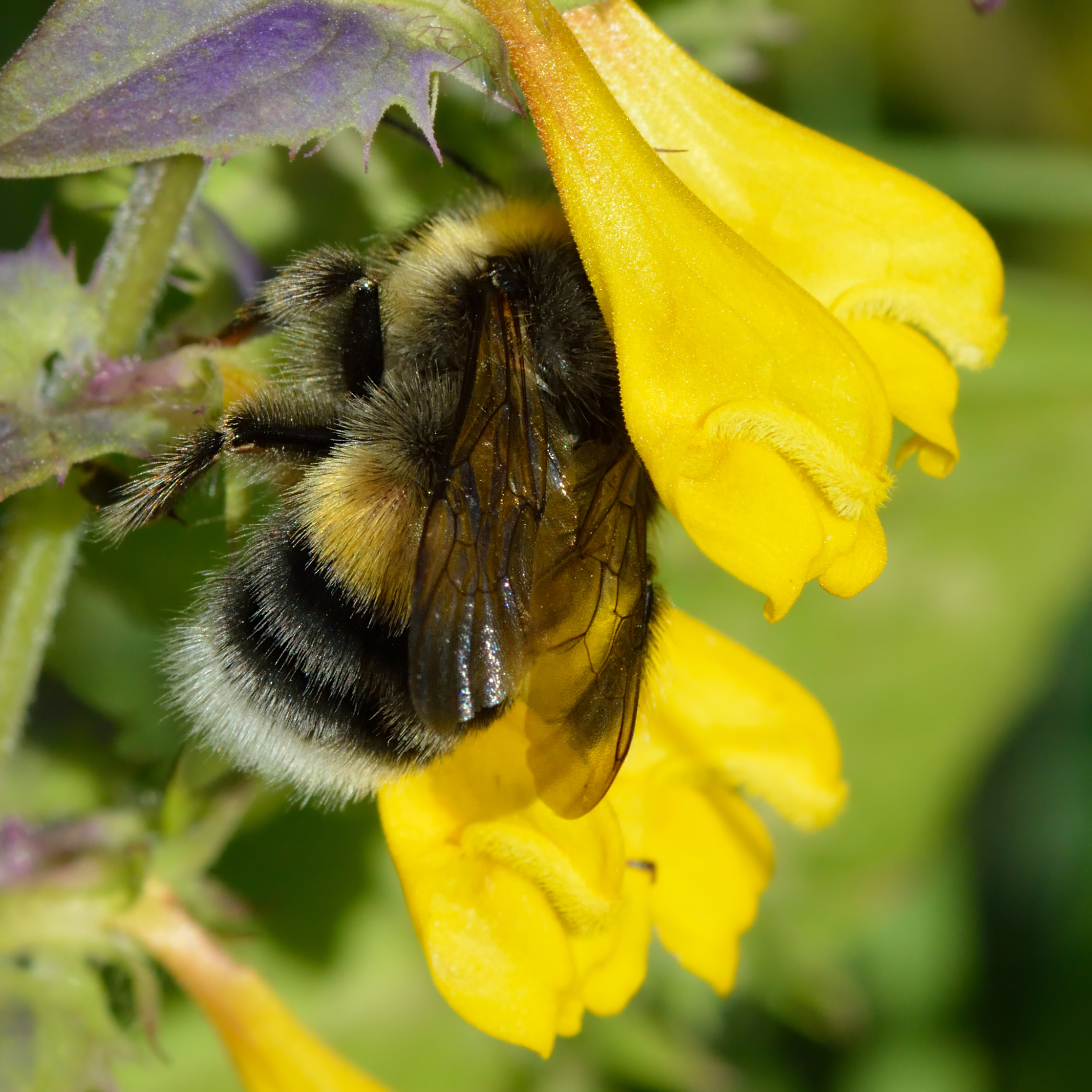
Melampyrum nemorosum

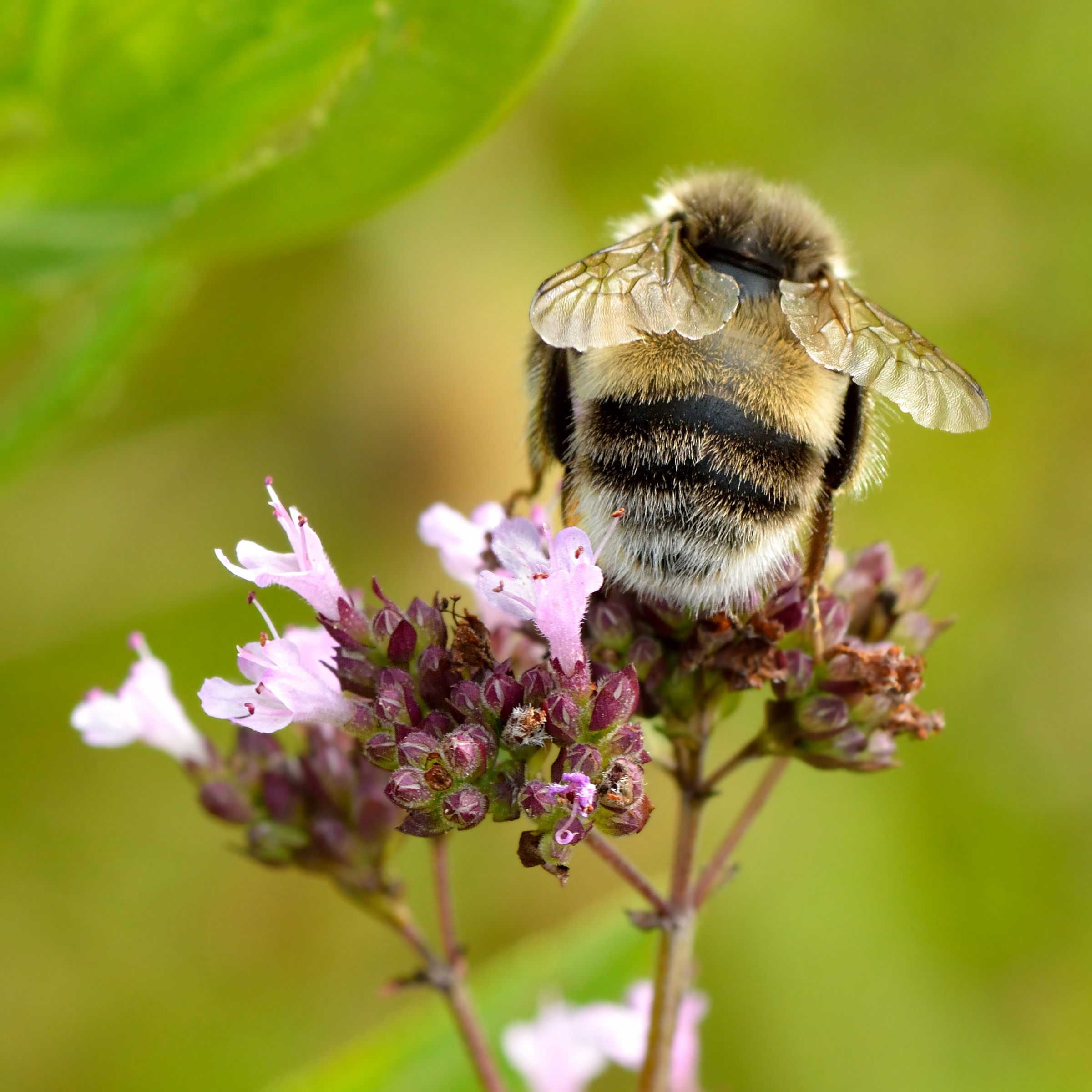
Origanum vulgare

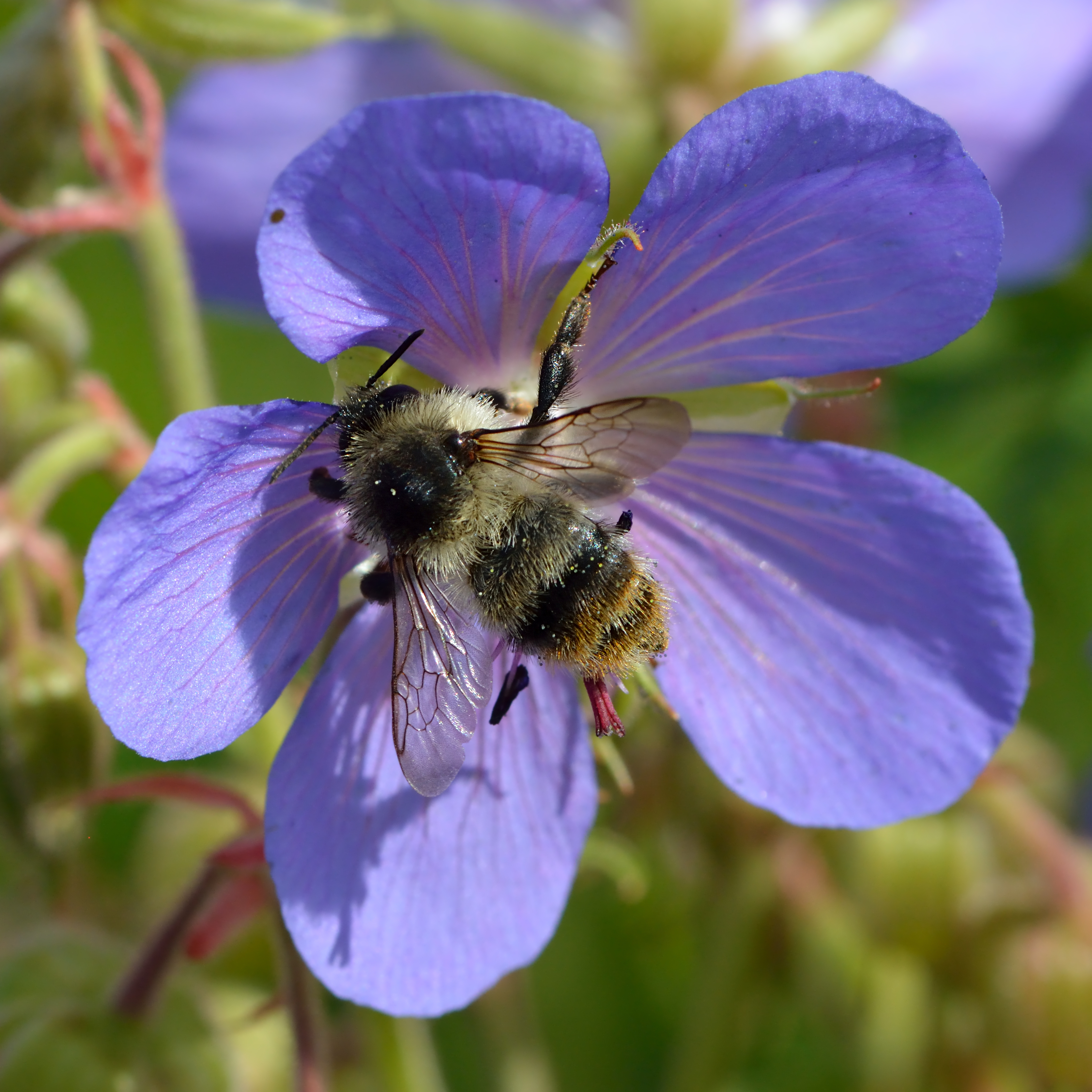
Geranium pratense

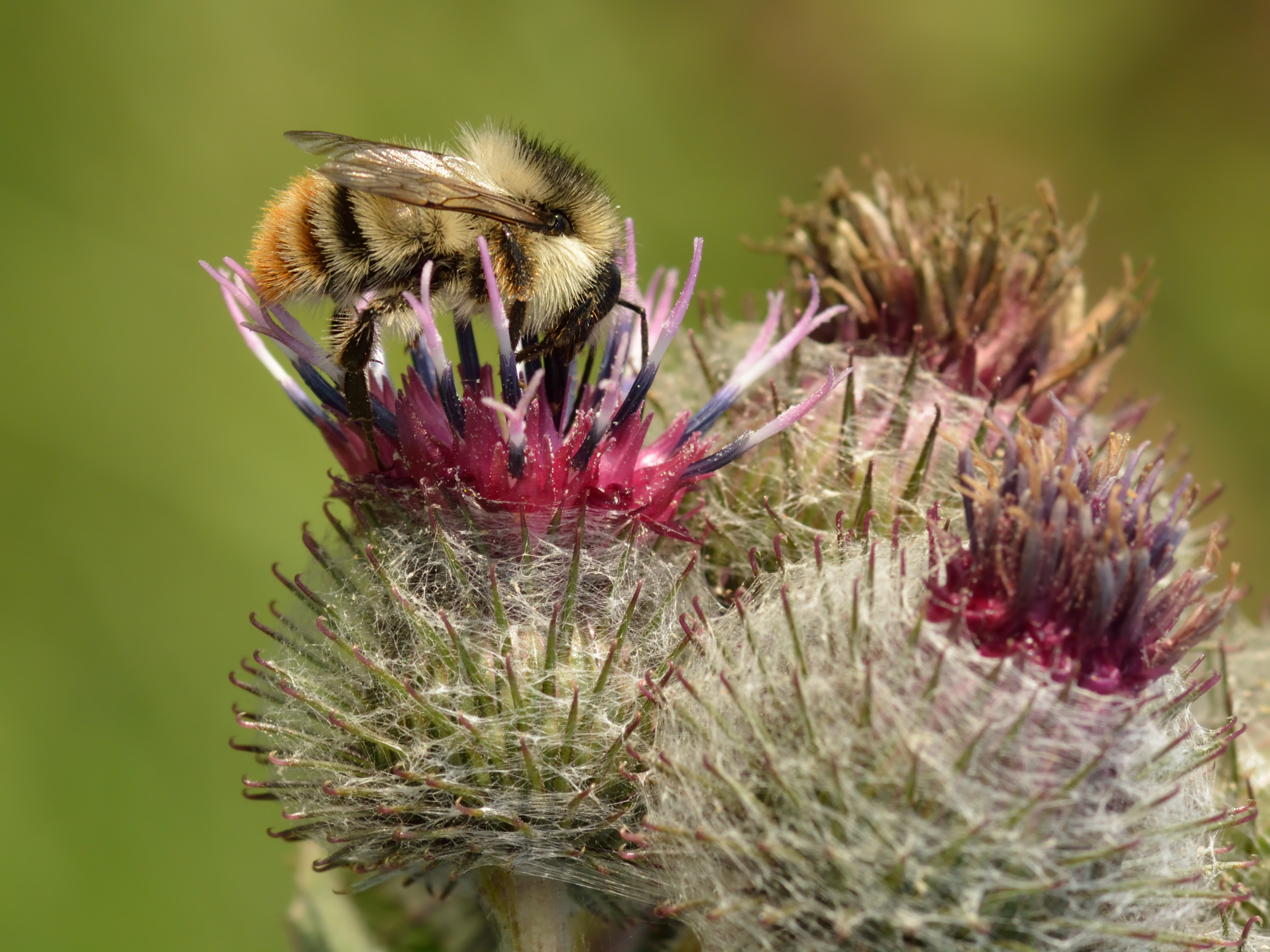
Arctium tomentosum

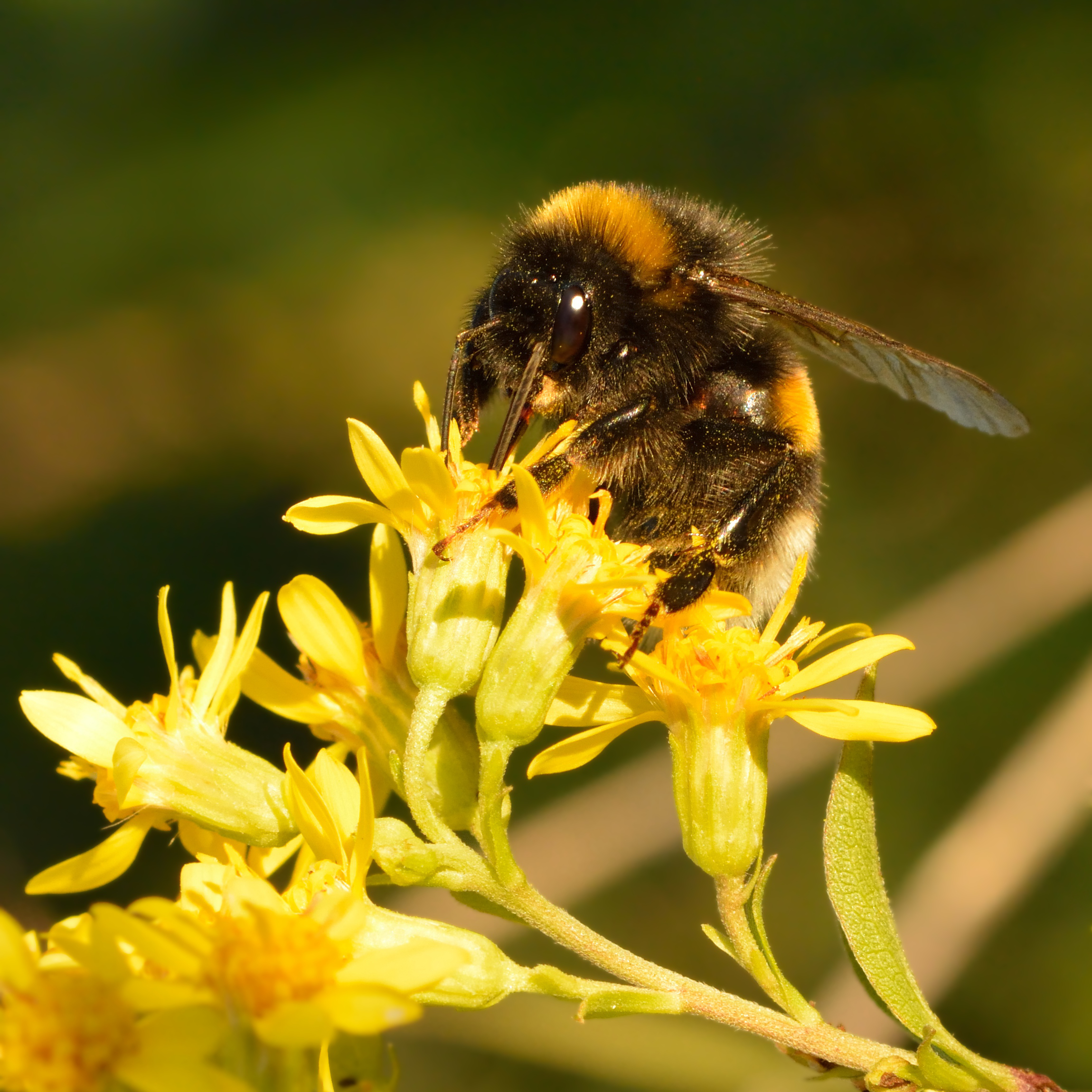
Solidago virgaurea

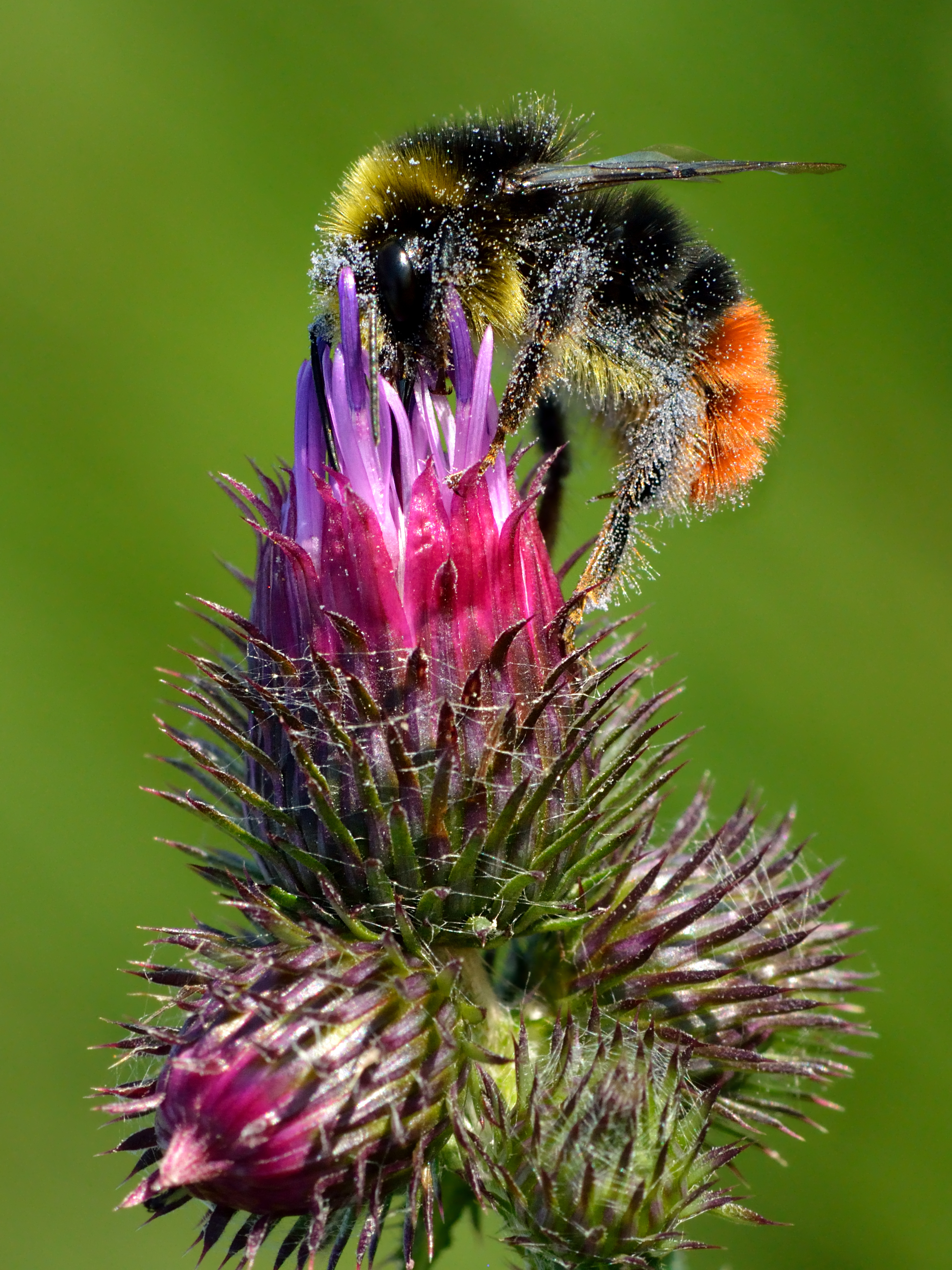
Carduus crispus

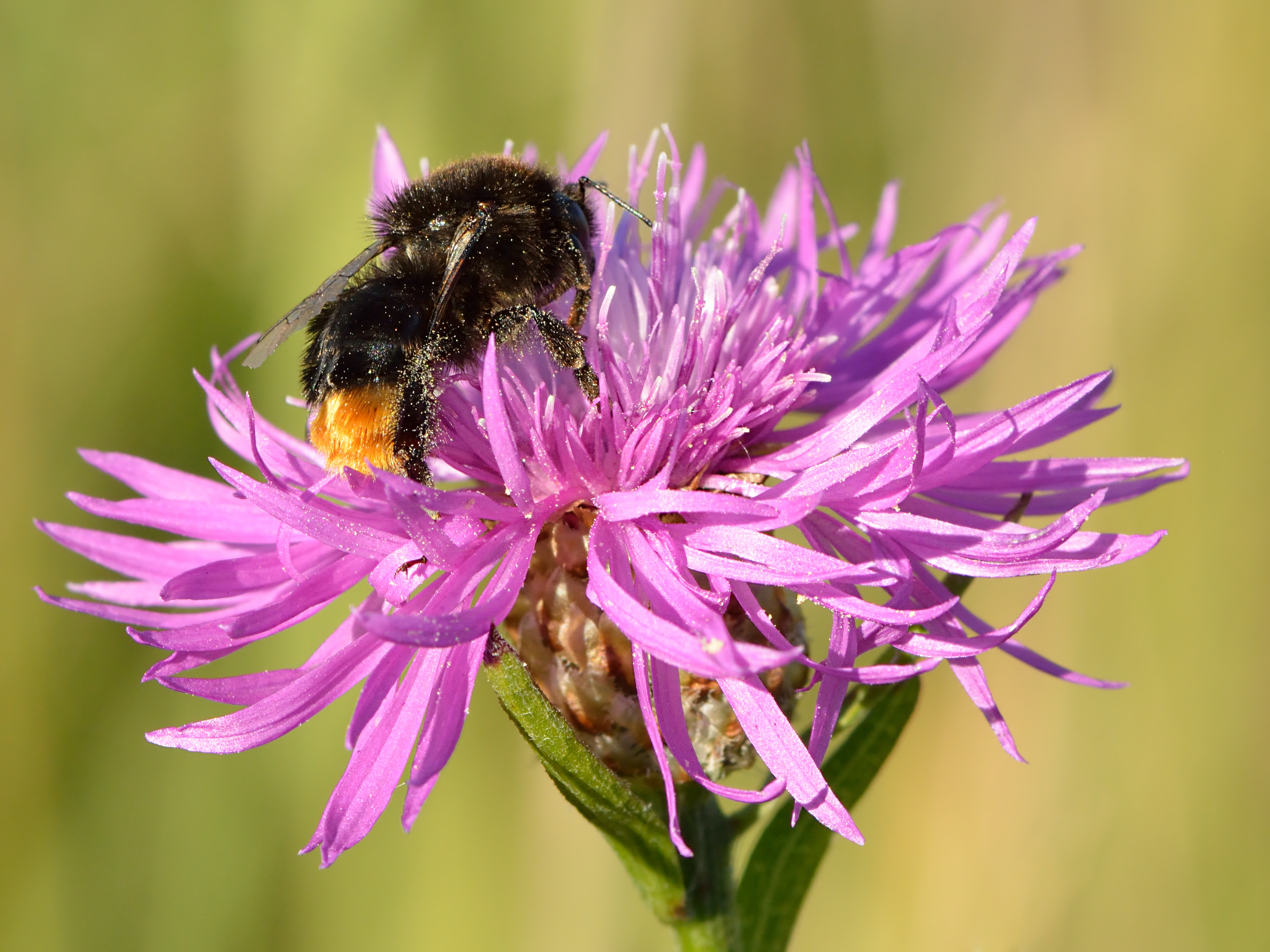
Centaurea jacea

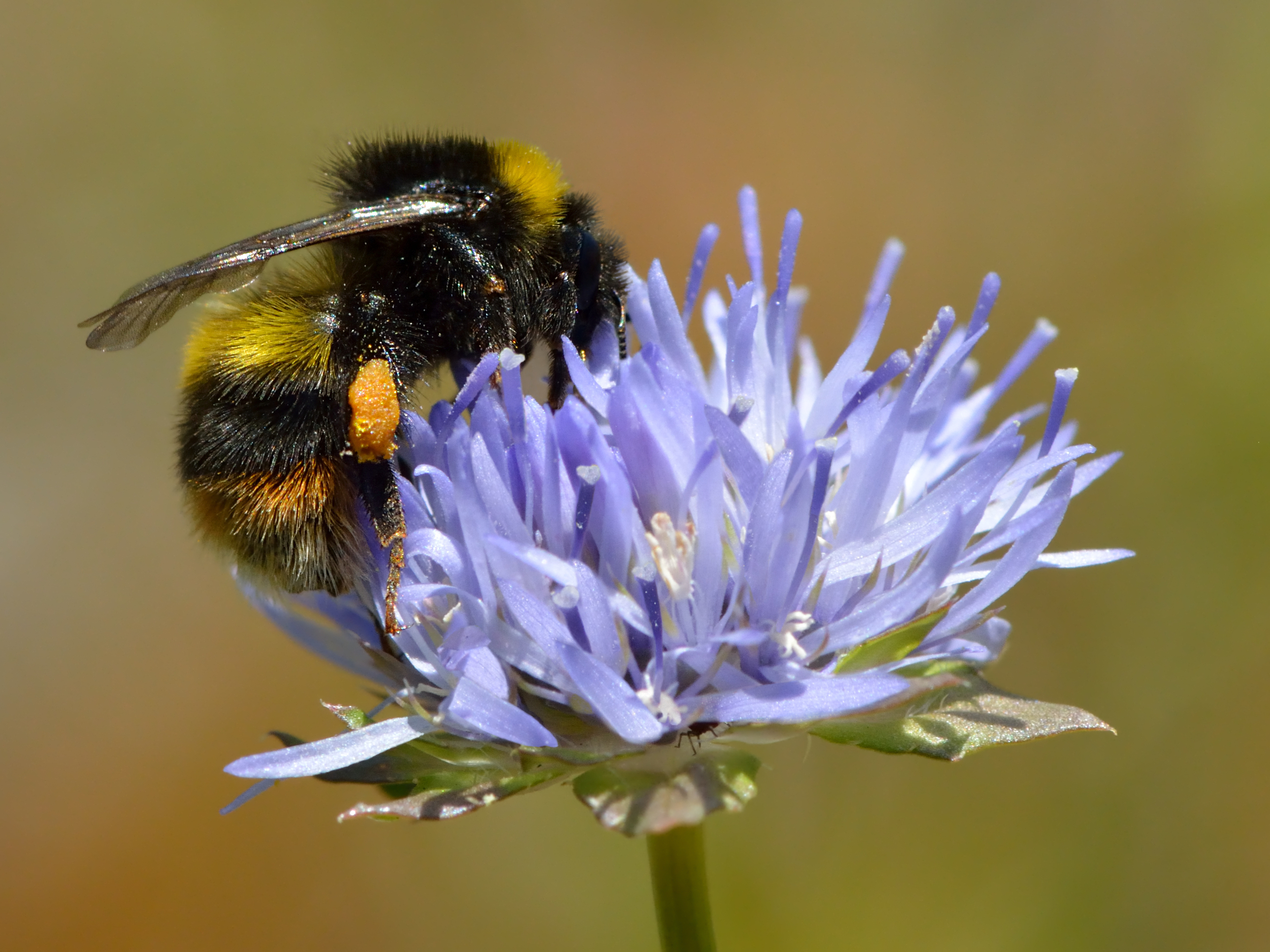
Jasione montana

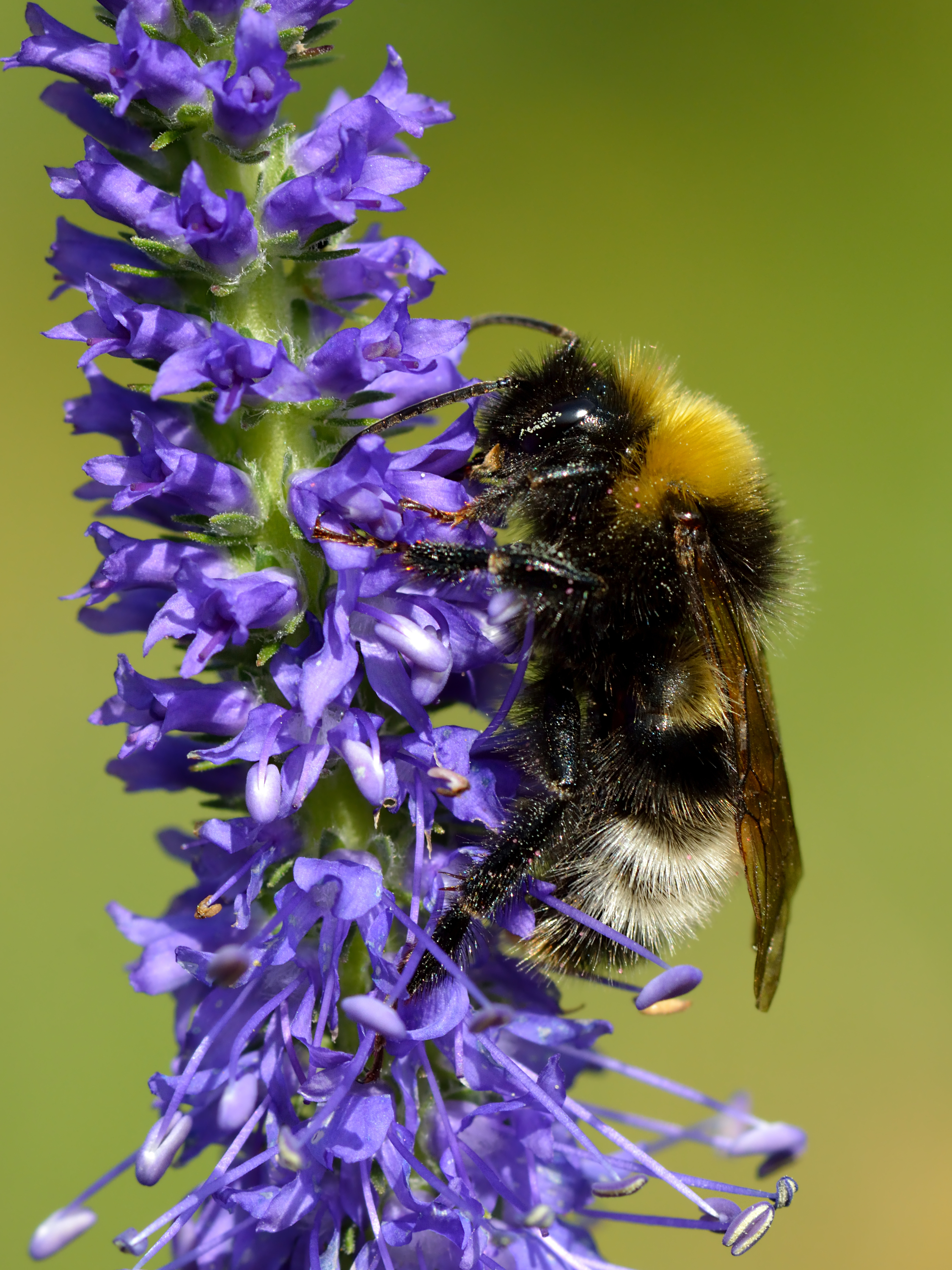
Veronica spicata

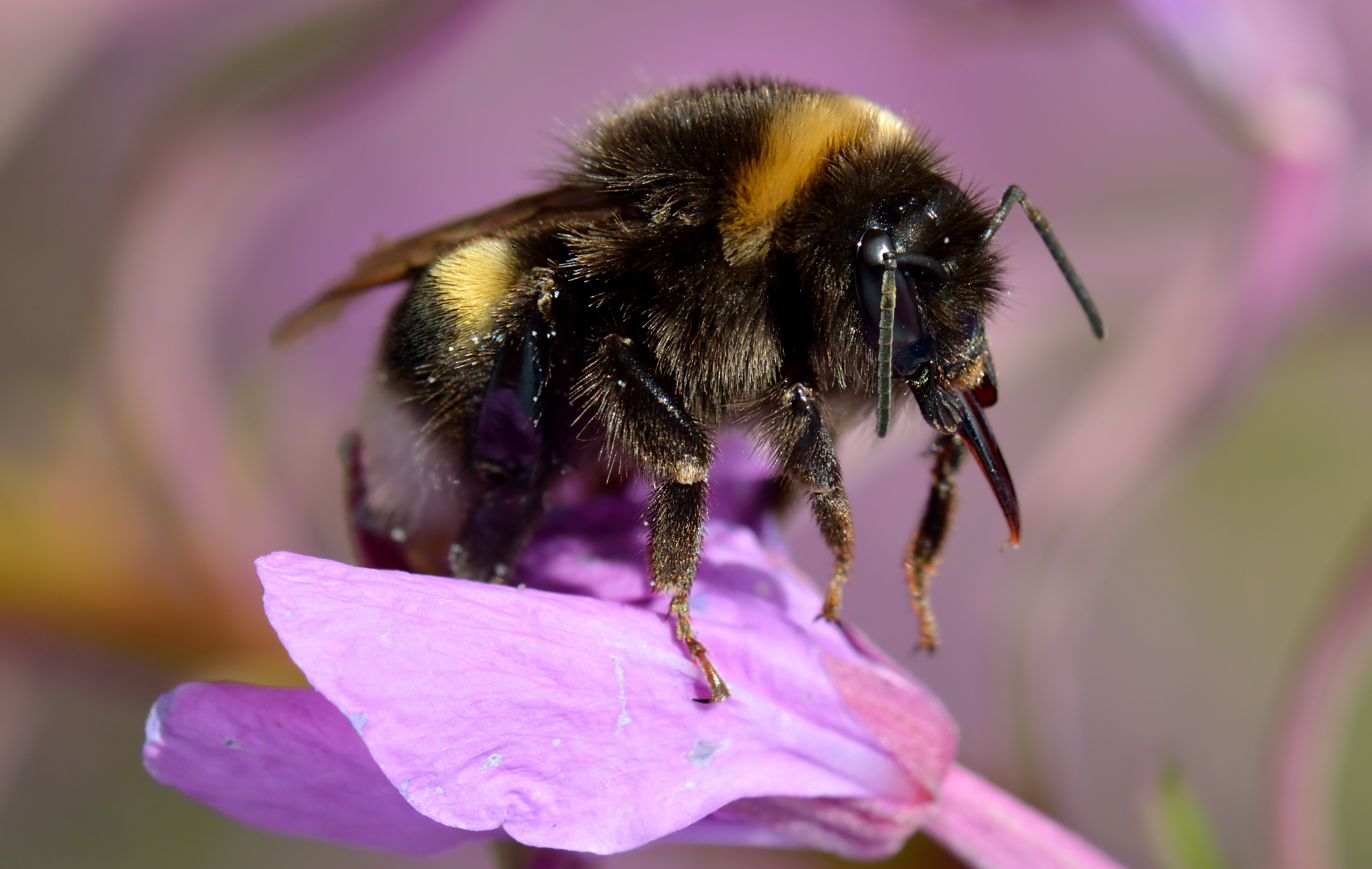
Chamaenerion angustifolium

Honeybees often collect nectar, pollen, or both from the following species of plants, which are called honey plants, for making honey. This is not an exhaustive list of the flowering plant species honeybees will visit.

== Acanthaceae (Acanthus family) ==
- Avicennia nitida Jacq. or Avicennia germinans (Black mangrove)

== Aceraceae (Sapindaceae) (Maple family) ==
- Acer rubrum L. (Red maple)
- Acer saccharinum L. (Sugar maple)
- Acer spicatum Lam. (Mountain maple)
- Acer pseudoplatanus L. (Sycamore maple)

== Agavaceae (Agave family) ==
- Agave sisalana Perrine ex Engelm. (Sisal)

== Alstroemeriaceae ==
- Alstroemeria cunea Vell.

== Amaranthaceae (Amaranth family) ==
- Alternanthera brasiliana Kuntze
- Alternanthera dentata (Moench) Stuchlik ex R.E.Fries
- Alternanthera polygonoides R.Br. ex Sweet
- Froelichia humboldtiana Seub.
- Froelichia lanata Moench
- Gomphrena canescens R.Br.
- Gomphrena demissa Mart.
- Gomphrena gardneri Moq.

== Amaryllidaceae (Amaryllis family) ==
- Allium cepa L.
- Allium sativum L.
- Allium schoenoprasum L.

== Anacardiaceae (Cashew family) ==
- Anacardium occidentale L.
- Anacardium humile A.St.-Hil.
- Astronium fraxinifolium Schott
- Lithraea molleoides Engl.
- Mangifera indica L.
- Myracrodruon urundeuva M.Allemão
- Schinus molle L.
- Schinus terebinthifolius Raddi
- Schinopsis brasiliensis Engl.
- Spondias lutea L.
- Spondias mombin L.
- Spondias tuberosa Arruda
- Tapirira guianensis Aubl.
- Tapirira marchandii Engl.

== Apiaceae (Parsley and carrot family) ==
- Apium graveolens L.
- Daucus carota L.
- Myrrhis odorata (L.) Scop.
- Pastinaca sativa L.
- Petroselinum crispum (Mill.) Fuss

== Apocynaceae (Dogbane family) ==
All the plants of this family are found in the tropics and subtropics.

- Aspidosperma cylindrocarpon Müll.Arg.
- Aspidosperma dasycarpon A.DC.
- Aspidosperma macrocarpon Mart.
- Aspidosperma parvifolium A.DC.
- Aspidosperma polyneuron A.DC.
- Aspidosperma pruinosum Markgr.
- Aspidosperma pyrifolium Mart., syn. Aspidosperma populifolium A.DC.
- Hancornia speciosa Gomes
- Peschiera affinis Miers
- Rhodocalyx rotundifolia Müll.Arg.
- Tabernaemontana fuchsiaefolia A.DC.

== Aquifoliaceae (Holly family) ==
- Ilex decidua Walter
- Ilex glabra A.Gray
- Ilex opaca Aiton
- Ilex theezans Mart.
- Ilex verticillata A.Gray

== Araliaceae (Aralia and ivy family) ==
- Didymopanax macrocarpum Seem.
- Didymopanax vinosum Marchal

== Asclepiadaceae (Milkweed family) ==
- Asclepias tuberosa L.

== Arecaceae (Palm family) ==
- Acrocomia aculeata Lodd. ex Mart.
- Attalea speciosa Mart.
- Roystonea elata (Bartr.) F.Harper
- Sabal palmetto Lodd. ex Schult.f.
- Syagrus romanzoffiana (Cham.) Glassman (= Cocos romanzoffiana Cham., or Arecastrum romanzoffianum (Cham.) Becc.).
- Trithrinax campestris (Burmeist.) Drude & Griseb.

== Asteraceae (Aster, daisy, sunflower family) ==
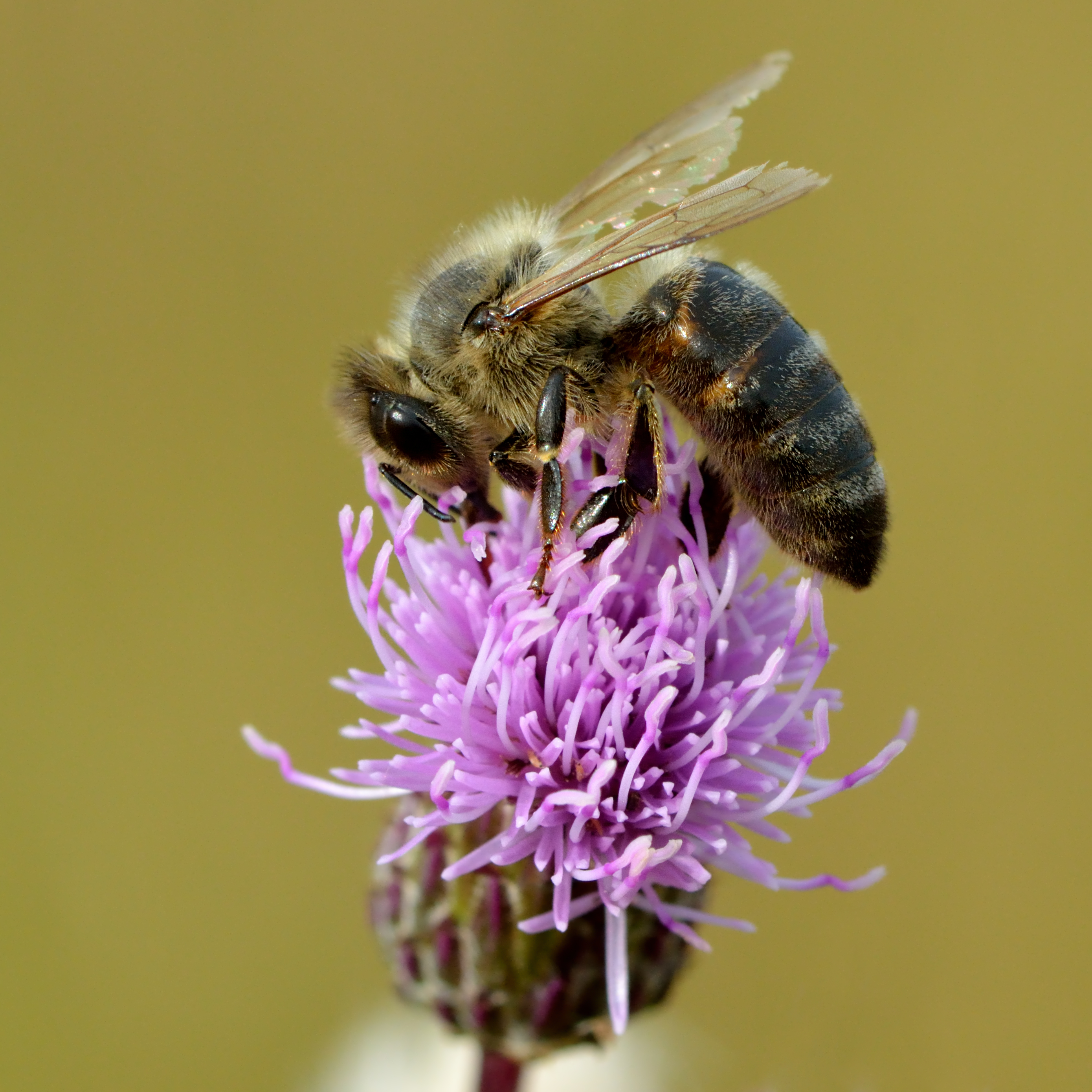
Cirsium arvense

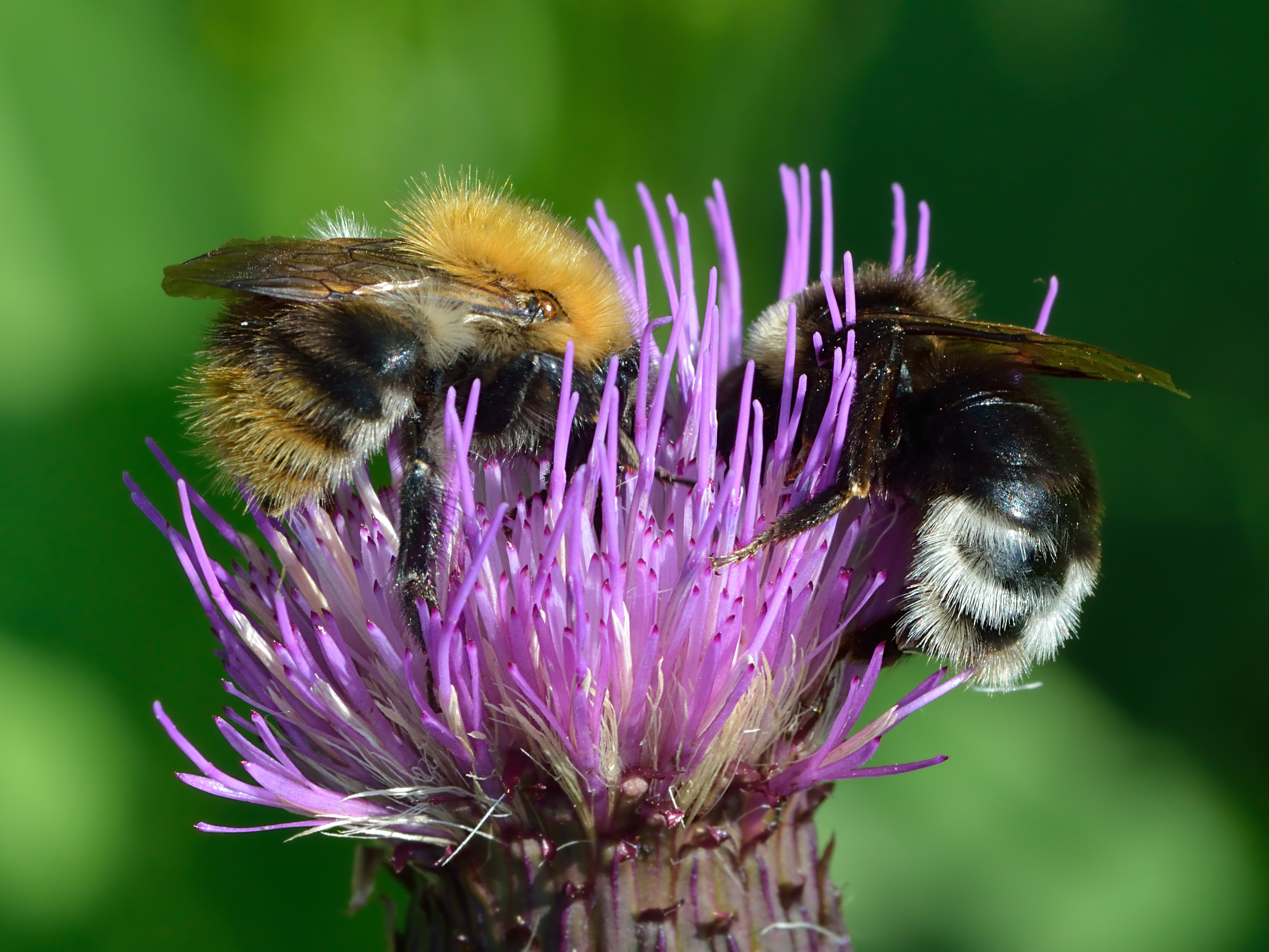
Cirsium heterophyllum

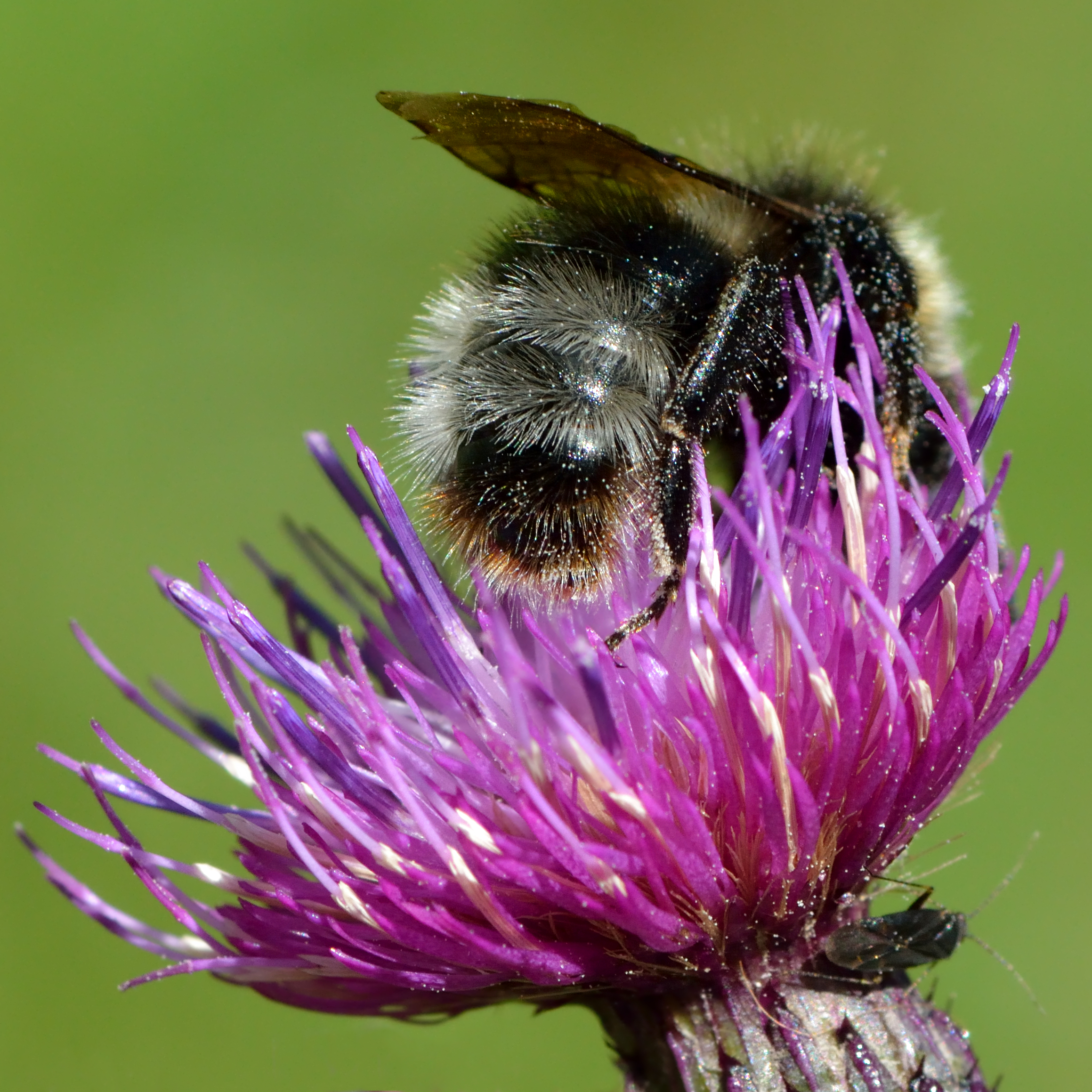
Cirsium palustre

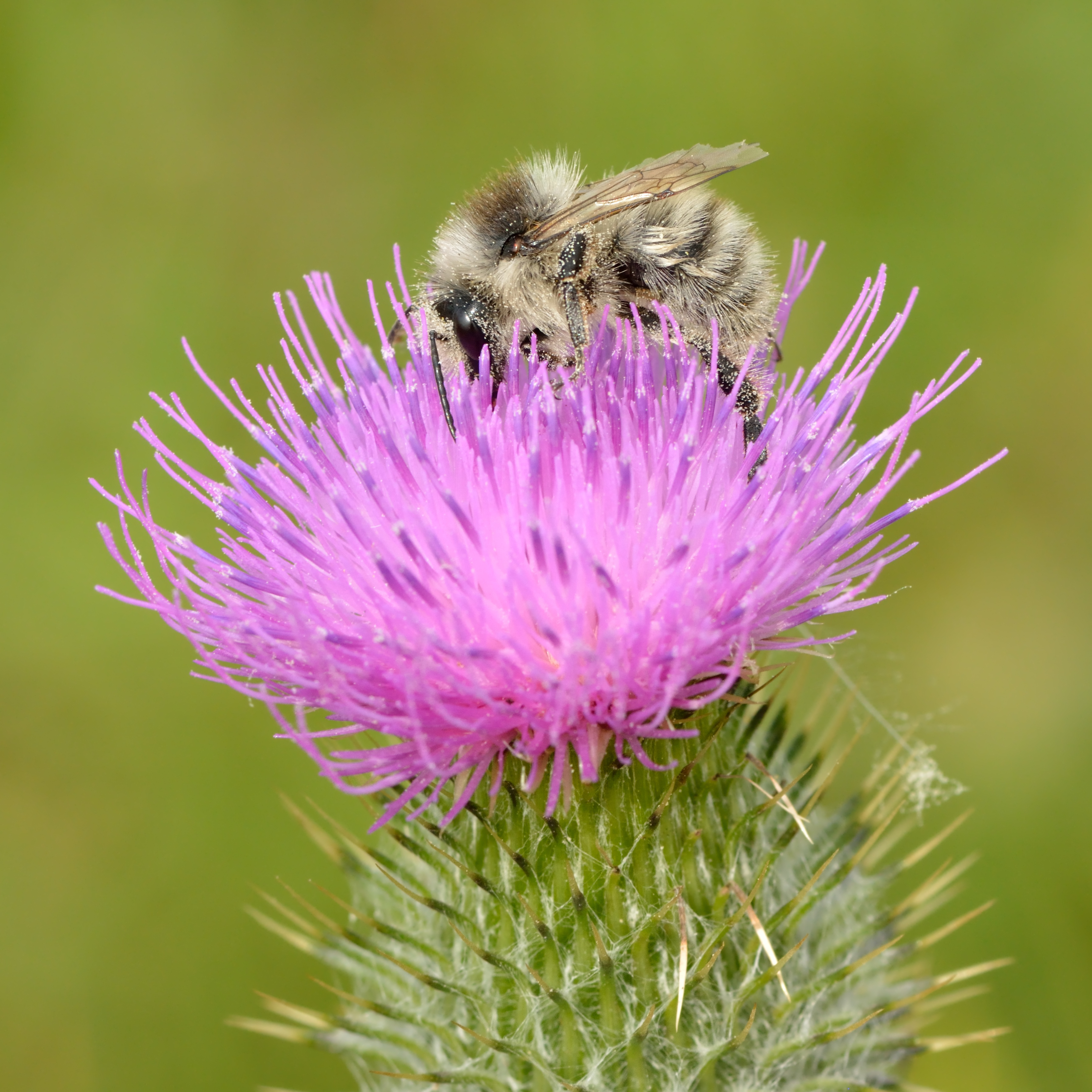
Cirsium vulgare

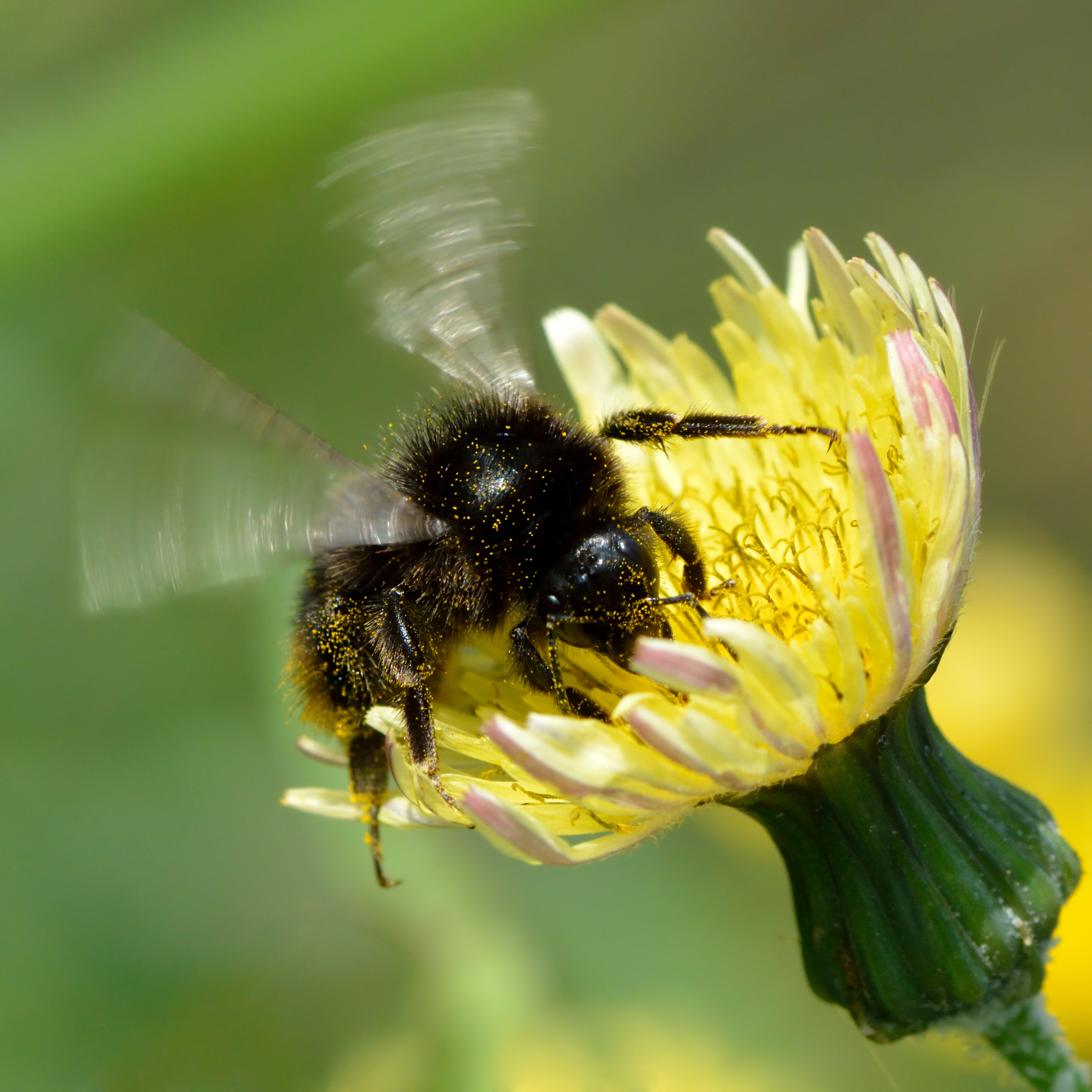
Sonchus arvensis

- Ambrosia polystachya DC.
- Baccharis dracunculifolia DC.
- Baccharis genistelloides Pers.
- Baccharis gracilis DC.
- Baccharis halimifolia L.
- Baccharis ligustrina DC.
- Baccharis platypoda DC.
- Baccharis punctulata DC.
- Baccharis serrula Sch.Bip.
- Baccharis sessifolia L.
- Baccharis tridentata Vahl
- Bidens cernua L.
- Bidens pilosa L.
- Cichorium intybus L.
- Cirsium arvense (L.) Scop. (= Carduus arvensis, or Cirsium incanum)
- Cirsium vulgare (Savi) Ten. (= Carduus vulgaris, Carduus lanceolatus, or Cirsium lanceolatum)
- Centaurea biebersteinii (Jaub. et Spach) Walp.
- Centratherum punctatum Cass.
- Cosmos sulphureus Cav.
- Echinops sphaerocephalus L.
- Eremanthus sphaerocephalus Baker
- Eupatorium itatiayense Hieron.
- Eupatorium maculatum L.
- Eupatorium maximiliani Schrad. ex DC.
- Eupatorium purpureum L.
- Eupatorium squalidum DC.
- Helianthus annuus L. (Sunflower)
- Helianthus tuberosus L. (Jerusalem artichoke)
- Inula magnifica Lipsky
- Karelinia caspia (Pall.) Less.
- Liatris spicata Willd.
- Mikania cordifolia Willd.
- Mikania hirsutissima DC.
- Mikania microphylla Sch.Bip. ex Baker
- Mikania speciosa DC.
- Mikania sessilifolia DC.
- Moquinia polymorpha DC.
- Oligoneuron rigidum Small (= Solidago rigida L.)
- Piptocarpha notata Baker
- Piptocarpha rotundifolia Baker
- Rudbeckia spp. L.
- Sonchus arvensis L.
- Senecio brasiliensis Less.
- Solidago chilensis Meyen
- Symphyotrichum novae-angliae (L.) G.L.Nesom
- Taraxacum officinale Weber
- Trichogonia salviaefolia Gardner
- Trixis antimenorrhoea Mart. ex Baker
- Verbesina alternifolia Britton ex Kearney
- Vernonia apiculata Mart. ex DC.
- Vernonia argyrophylla Less.
- Vernonia diffusa Less.
- Vernonia herbacea Rusby
- Vernonia lacunosa Mart. ex DC.
- Vernonia linearis D.Don ex Hook. et Arn.
- Vernonia patens Kunth
- Vernonia polyanthes Less.
- Vernonia scorpioides Pers.
- Vernonia virgata Gagnep.
- Zinnia multiflora L.

== Bignoniaceae (Trumpet creeper family) ==
All the plants of this family are found mostly in the tropics or subtropics.

- Campsis radicans Seem. (= Bignonia radicans, or Tecoma radicans)
- Catalpa bignonioides Walter
- Catalpa speciosa Warder ex Engelm.
- Cybistax antisyphilitica (Mart.) Mart.
- Handroanthus albus
- Handroanthus impetiginosus
- Jacaranda brasiliana Pers.
- Jacaranda caroba Hort. ex Lem.
- Jacaranda decurrens Cham.
- Jacaranda paucifoliolata Mart. ex DC.
- Memora glaberrima K.Schum.
- Memora nodosa Miers
- Podranea ricasoliana (Tanfani) T. Sprague
- Pyrostegia ignea Presl
- Pyrostegia venusta Miers
- Tabebuia aurea
- Tabebuia chrysotricha
- Tabebuia heptaphylla (Vell.) Toledo
- Tabebuia ochracea
- Tabebuia rosea (Bertol.) DC.
- Tabebuia roseo-alba
- Tabebuia serratifolia
- Tabebuia vellosoi Toledo
- Zeyheria digitalis (Vell.) Hoehne et Kuhlm.

== Bixaceae (Achiote family) ==
- Bixa orellana L.

== Bombacaceae (see also Malva family) ==
- Bombax campestre K.Schum.
- Bombax tomentosum A.Juss.
- Chorisia speciosa A.St.-Hil.
- Eriotheca gracilipes (K.Schum.) A.Robyns
- Pseudobombax grandiflorum (Cav.) A.Robyns

== Boraginaceae (Borage or Forget-me-not family) ==
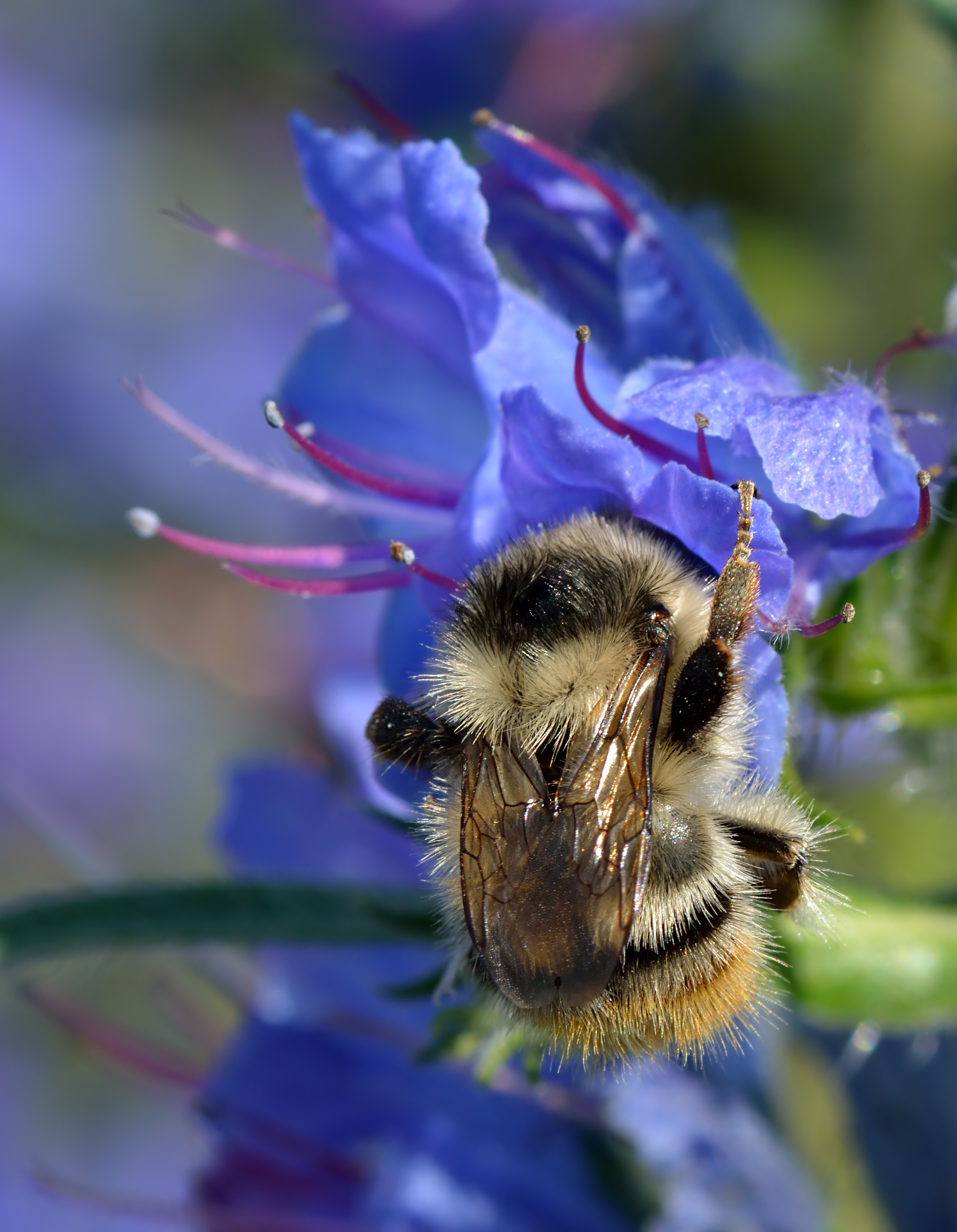
Echium vulgare

- Anchusa strigosa Banks & Sol.
- Auxemma glazioviana Taub.
- Auxemma oncocalyx Taub.
- Borago officinalis L.
- Cerinthe major L.
- Cordi alliodora Cham.
- Cordia campestris Warm.
- Cordia corymbosa G.Don
- Cordia hypoleuca DC.
- Cordia insignis Cham.
- Cordia leucocephala Moric.
- Cordia nodosa Lam.
- Cordia trichotoma (Vell.) Steud.
- Cordia verbenacea DC.
- Echium plantagineum L.
- Echium simplex DC.
- Echium virescens DC.
- Echium wildpretii H.Pearson ex Hook.f.
- Symphytum brachycalyx Boiss.
- Phacelia tanacetifolia Benth.
- Patagonula americana L.

== Brassicaceae (Mustard family or cabbage family) ==
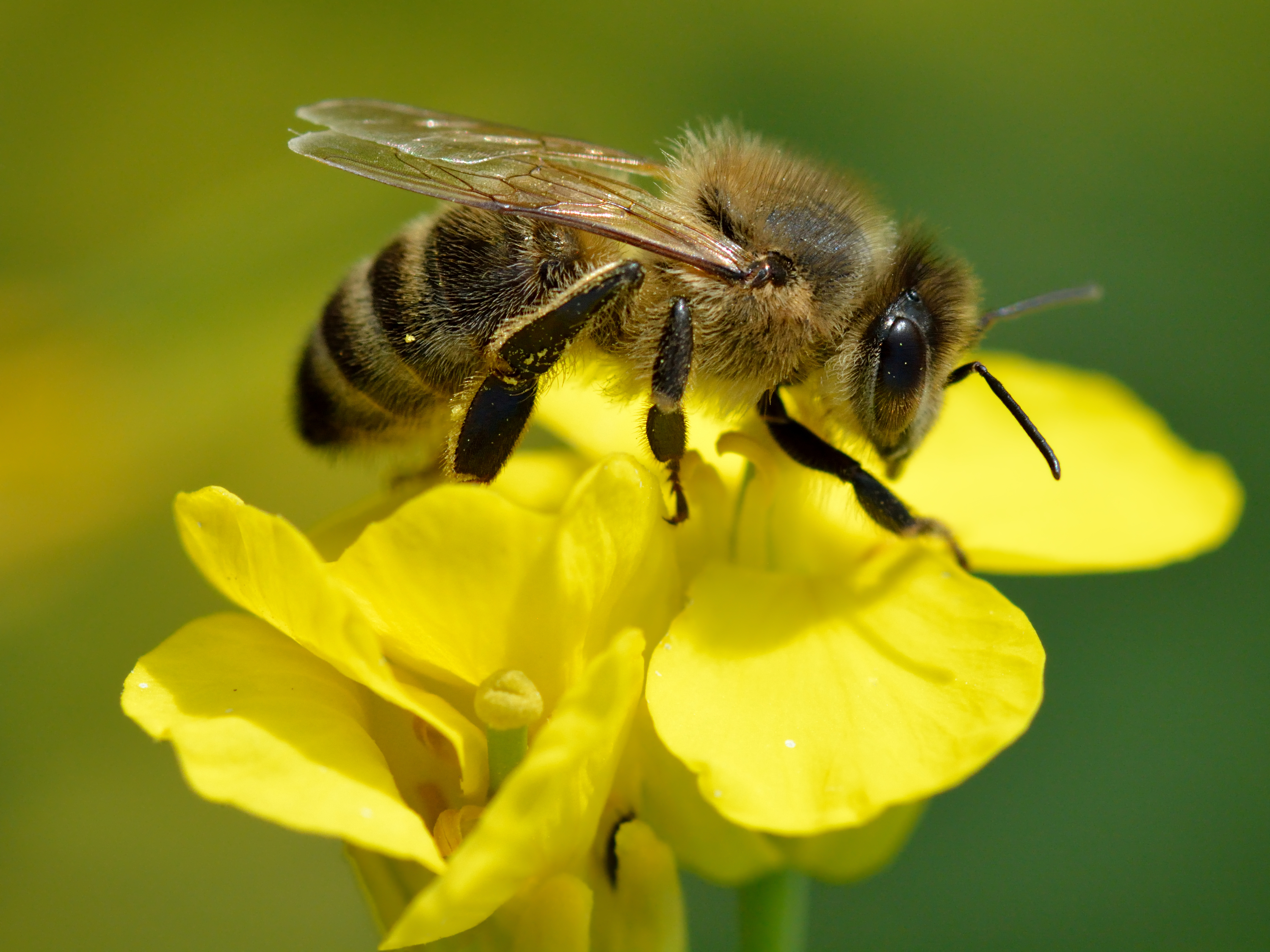
Brassica napus

- Brassica campestris L.
- Brassica juncea Coss.
- Brassica napus L.
- Brassica oleracea L. var. botrytis L.
- Brassica oleracea L. var. capitata
- Brassica oleracea L. var. gemnifera
- Brassica oleracea L. var. gongylodes
- Eruca sativa Mill.
- Lobularia maritima (L.) Desv.
- Sinapis alba L.

== Caesalpinioideae ==
- Apuleia molaris Spruce ex Benth.
- Bauhinia forficata Link
- Cassia ferruginea (Schrad.) DC.
- Cassia grandis L.f.
- Caesalpinia echinata Lam.
- Caesalpinia ferrea Mart.
- Caesalpinia peltophoroides Benth.
- Caesalpinia pyramidalis Tul.
- Caesalpinia microphylla Mart.
- Copaifera langsdorffii Desf.
- Copaifera oblongifolia Mart. ex Hayne
- Delonix regia Raf.
- Hymenaea courbaril var. stilbocarpa (Hayne) Y.T.Lee et Langenh.
- Schizolobium parahyba (Vell.) Blake
- Schotia brachypetala Sond.
- Sclerolobium aureum Baill.
- Sclerolobium paniculatum Vogel
- Senna martiana (Benth.) H.S.Irwin et Barneby
- Senna multijuga (Rich.) H.S.Irwin et Barneby
- Senna speciosa Roxb.
- Senna splendida (Vogel) H.S.Irwin et Barneby

== Cannabaceae (Hemp Family) ==
- Celti brasiliensis Planch.
- Trema micrantha (L.) Blume

== Capparaceae (Caper family) ==
- Cleome gynandra L.

== Caprifoliaceae (Honeysuckle family) ==
- Lonicera japonica Thunb. ex A.Murray bis

== Caryocaraceae ==
All the plants of this family are found only in the neotropics.

- Caryoca brasiliense Cambess.

== Caryophyllaceae (Carnation family) ==
- Saponaria officinalis L.

== Celastraceae (staff vine or bittersweet family) ==
- Maytenus boaria Molina

== Chrysobalanaceae ==
found in tropics or sub-tropics

- Couepia grandiflora Benth.
- Parinari obtusifolia Hook.f.
- Hirtella glandulosa Spreng.
- Hirtella martiana Hook.f.

== Clethraceae ==
- Clethra scabra Pers.

== Clusiaceae ==
- Kielmeyera coriacea Mart. & Zucc.

== Cochlospermaceae ==
- Cochlospermum regium Pilg.

== Combretaceae ==
- Terminalia argentea Mart.
- Terminalia brasiliensis Eichl.
- Terminalia fagifolia Mart.

== Commelinaceae ==
- Commelina agraria Kunth
- Tradescantia virginica L.

== Convolvulaceae (Bindweed or morning glory family) ==
- Ipomoea purpurea Roth
- Ipomoea batatoides Benth.
- Jacquemontia blanchetii Moric.
- Rivea corymbosa (L.) Hallier f.

== Cucurbitaceae (Melon, cucumber, calabash, squash family) ==
- Cayaponia ficifolia Cogn.
- Citrullus vulgaris Schrad. C.lanatus Nakai
- Cucumis melo L.
- Cucumis sativus L.
- Cucurbita maxima Duchesne
- Cucurbita pepo L.
- Luffa cylindrica M.Roem.

== Cunoniaceae ==
- Eucryphia cordifolia Cav.
- Eucryphia lucida (Labill.) Baill.
- Lamonia speciosa (Cambess.) L.B.Sm.
- Weinmannia trichosperma Ruiz & Pav.

== Dilleniaceae ==
- Curatella americana L.
- Davilla rugosa Poir.

== Ebenaceae ==
- Diospyros kaki L.f.

== Elaeocarpaceae ==
- Crinodendron patagua Mol.

== Ericaceae (Blueberry, Heather family) ==
- Arctostaphylos uva-ursi (L.) Spreng.
- Calluna vulgaris (L.) Hull
- Erica cinerea L.
- Oxydendrum arboreum (L.) DC.
- Vaccinium angustifolium Aiton
- Vaccinium corymbosum L.

== Erythroxylaceae (Coca family) ==
- Erythroxylum campestre A.St.-Hil.
- Erythroxylum suberosum A.St.-Hil.
- Erythroxylum tortuosum Mart.

== Escalloniaceae ==
- Escallonia montevidensis DC.

== Euphorbiaceae (Spurge family) ==
- Alchornea iricurana Casar.
- Alchornea triplinervia (Spreng.) Müll.Arg.
- Aleurites fordii Hemsl.
- Croton floribundus Spreng.
- Croton macrobothrys Baill.
- Croton salutaris Casar.
- Dalechampia humilis Müll.Arg.
- Euphorbia mellifera Seub.
- Euphorbia pulcherrima Willd. ex Klotzsch
- Julocroton triqueter Baill.
- Phyllanthus acidus (L.) Skeels
- Ricinus communis L.
- Sapium sebiferum (L.) Roxb.

== Faboideae (Legume family) ==
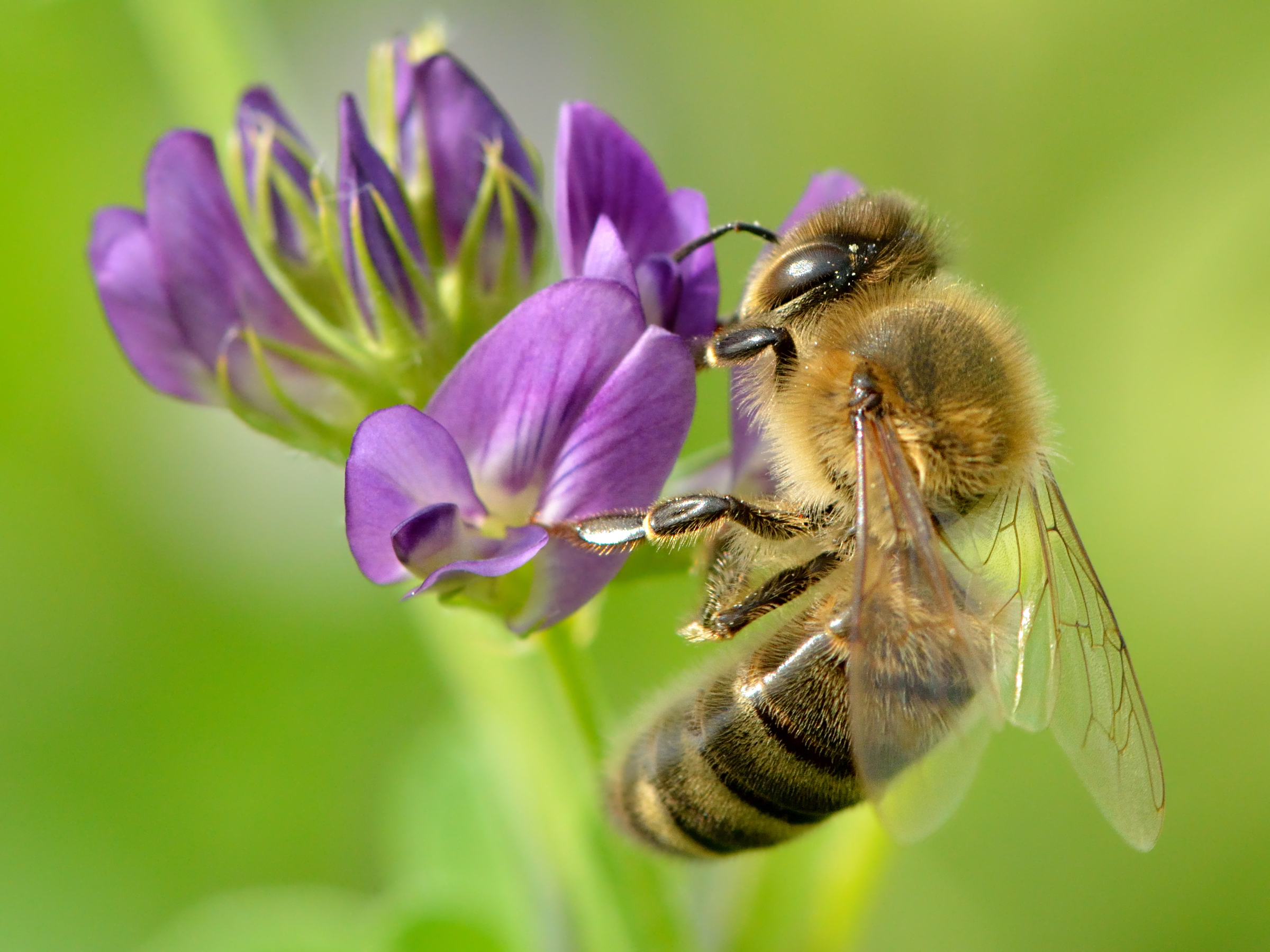
Medicago sativa

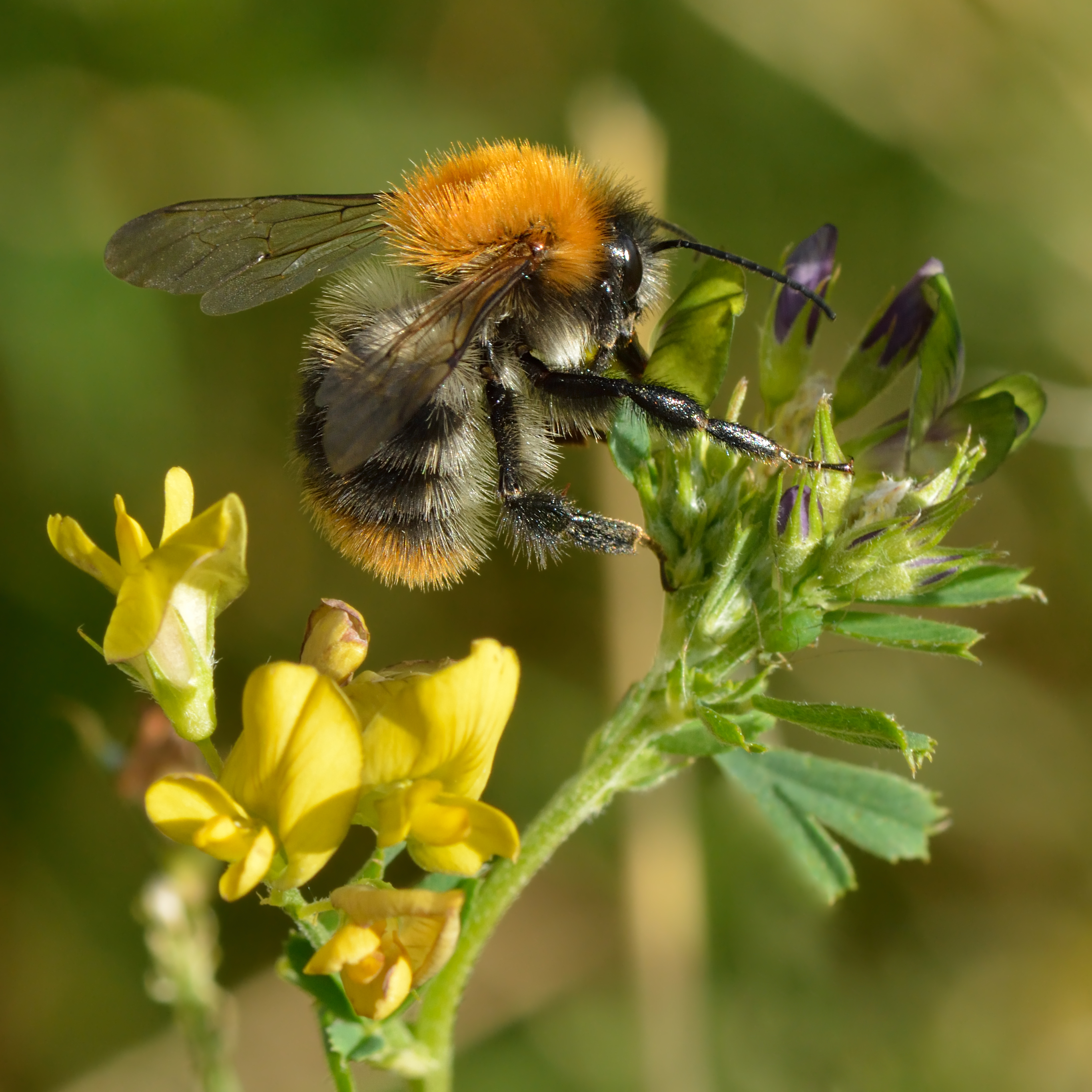
Medicago x varia

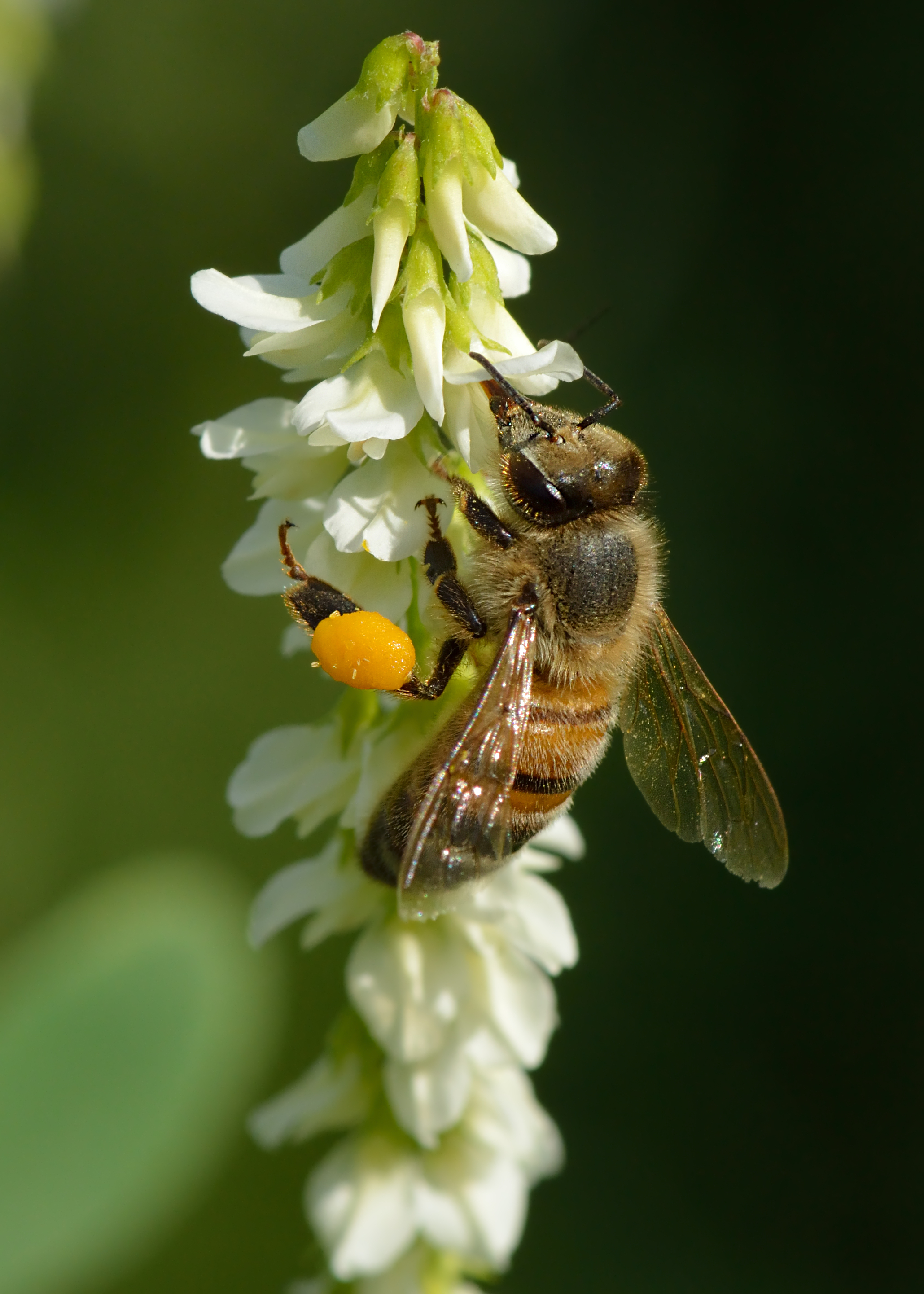
Melilotus albus

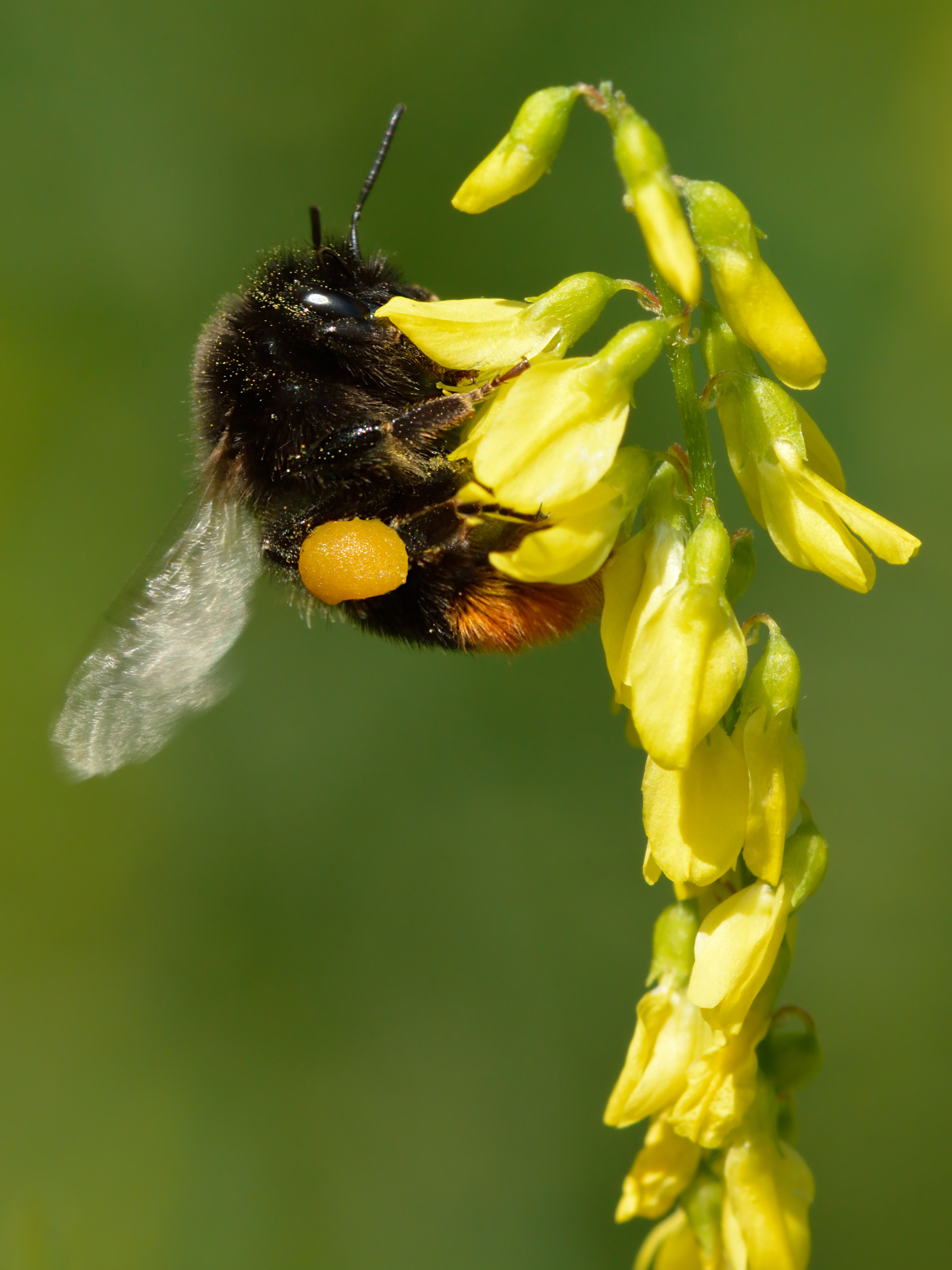
Melilotus officinalis

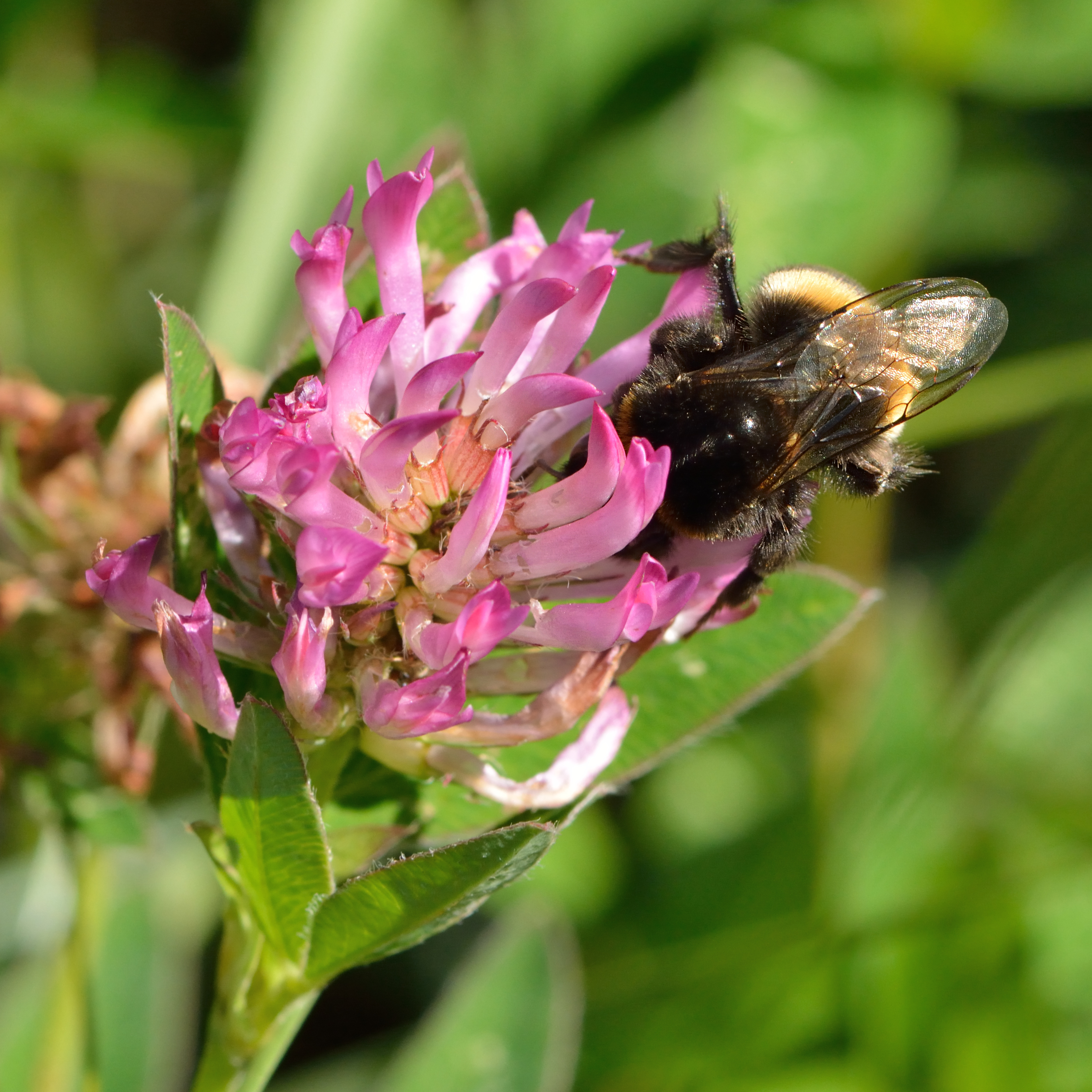
Trifolium medium

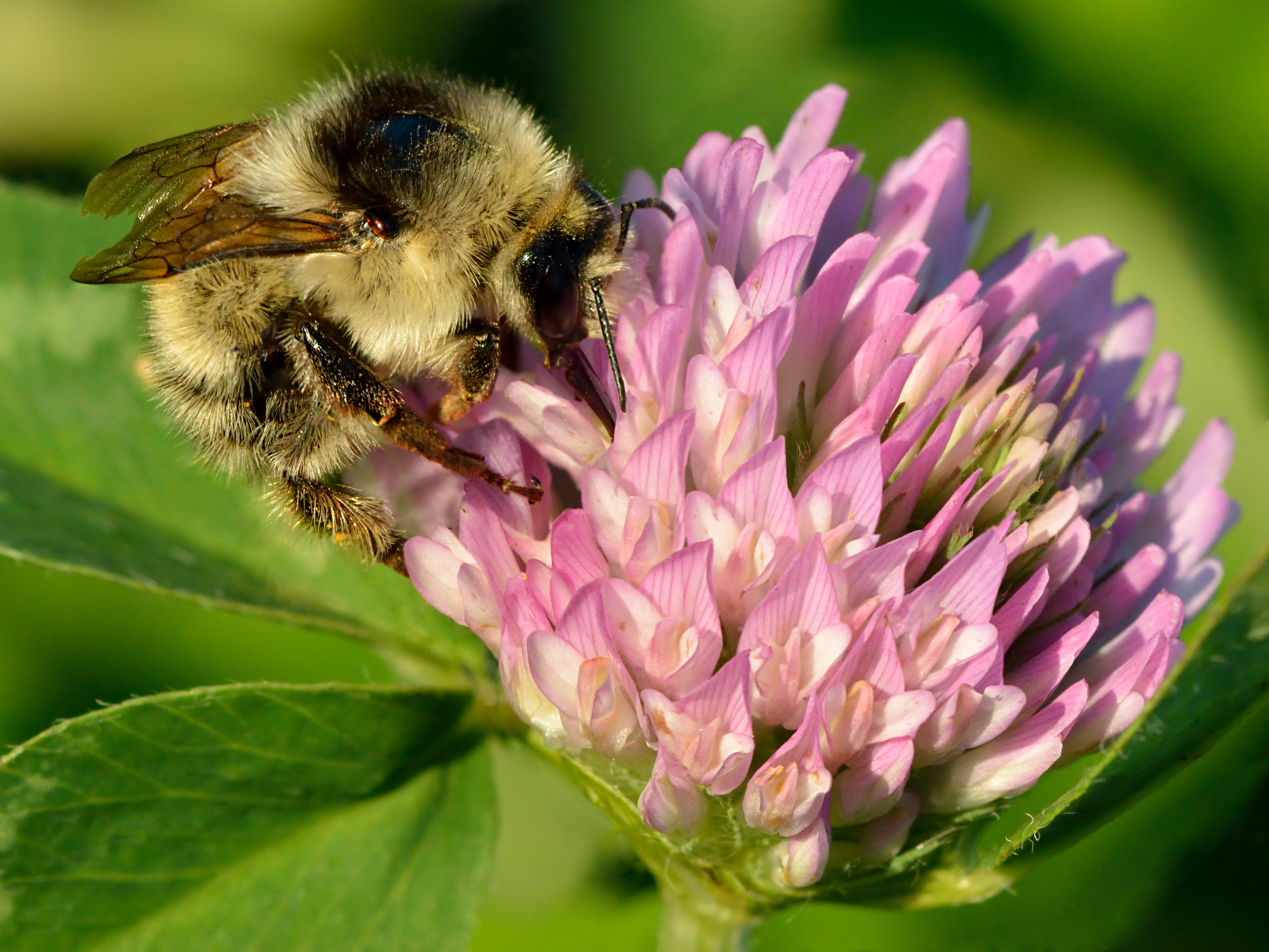
Trifolium pratense

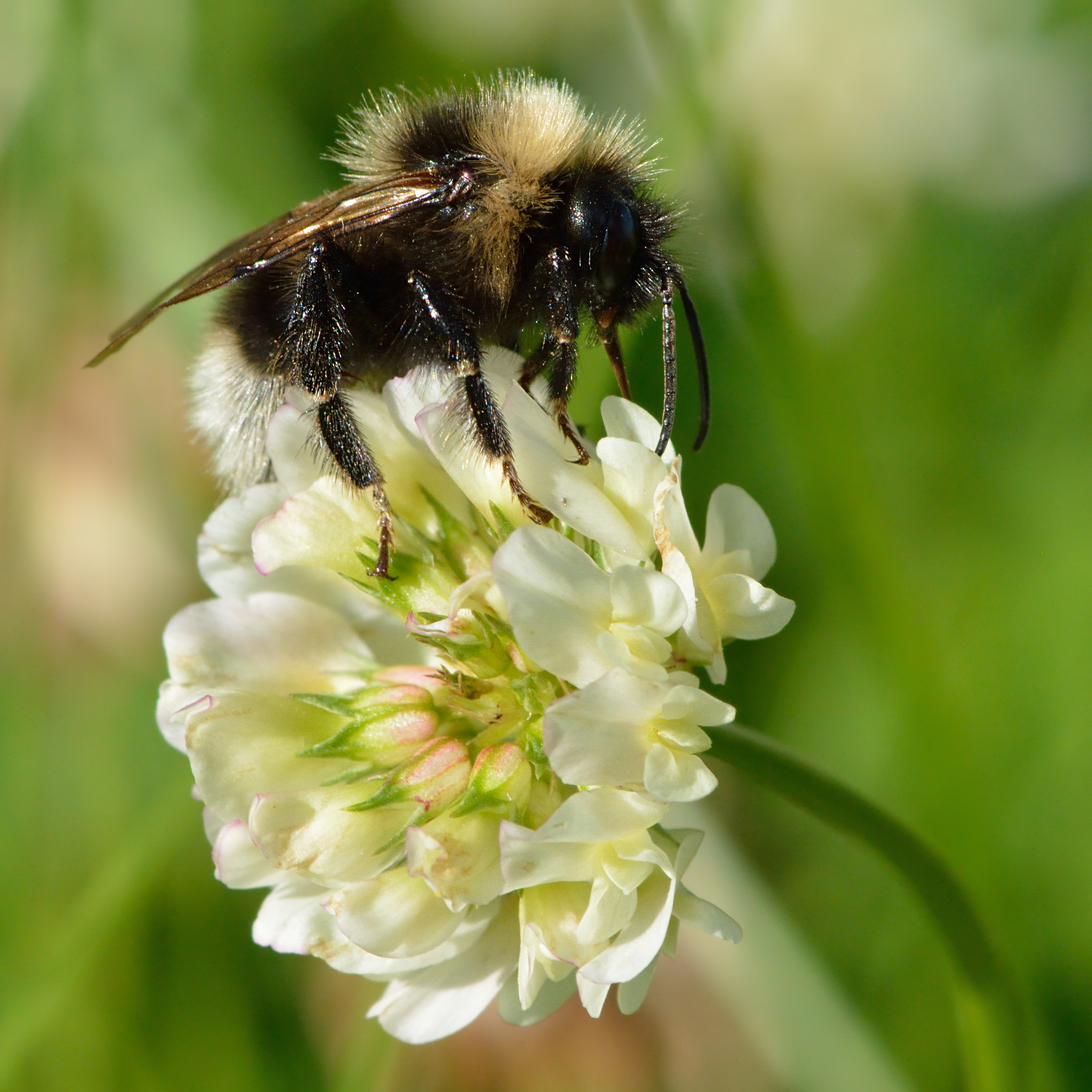
Trifolium repens

- Andira inermis (Wright) DC.
- Amburana cearensis (= Torresea cearensis M.Allemão) (M.Allemão) A.C.Smith
- Centrolobium robustum Mart. ex Benth.
- Gliricidia sepium (Jacq.) Steud
- Geoffraea spinosa Jacq.
- Machaerium acutifolium Vogel
- Machaerium scleroxylon Tul.
- Medicago sativa L.
- Melilotus alba Medik.
- Melilotus officinalis Lam.
- Myrocarpus frondosus M.Allemão
- Sweetia fruticosa var. fruticosa Spreng. (= Ferreirea spectabilis M.Allemão)
- Trifolium pratense L.
- Trifolium repens L.

== Iridaceae ==
- Crocus vernus (L.) Hill

== Lamiaceae (Mint family) ==
- Agastache foeniculum Kuntze
- Agastache nepetoides
- Eriope crassipes Benth.
- Hyptis brevipes Poit.
- Hyptis cana Pohl ex Benth.
- Hyptis nudicaulis Benth.
- Hyptis suaveolens Poit.
- Hyptis umbrosa Salzm. ex Benth.
- Lavandula spp. L.
- Leonurus cardiaca L.
- Leonurus sibiricus L.
- Monarda didyma L.
- Monarda fistulosa L.
- Nepeta cataria L.
- Nepeta × faassenii
- Nepeta mussinii Spreng. ex Henckel
- Nepeta siberica (= Nepeta macrantha, Dracocephalum sibiricum)
- Pycnanthemum tenuifolium Schrad.
- Pycnanthemum verticillatum Pursh var. pilosum (Nutt.) T.S.Cooperrider
- Pycnanthemum virginianum Trel. ex Branner et Coville
- Salvia splendens Ker Gawl.
- Satureja thymbra L.
- Stachys byzantina K.Koch
- Thymbra spicata L.
- Thymus capitatus (L.) Hoffmanns. & Link
- Thymus serpyllum L.
- Vitex sellowiana Cham.

== Lauraceae (Laurel family) ==
- Beilschmiedia berteroana (Gay) Kosterm.
- Nectandra cuspidata Nees et Mart. ex Nees
- Nectandra rigida Nees
- Persea americana Mill.
- Persea gratissima Gaertn.
- Ocotea kuhlmanni Vattimo
- Ocotea pretiosa Mez

== Lecythidaceae ==
- Cariniana legalis Kuntze
- Cariniana estrellensis Kuntze

== Liliaceae (Lily family) ==
- Smilax medica Schltdl. et Cham.
- Smilax officinalis Griseb.

== Lythraceae ==
- Cuphea carthaginensis Macbride
- Cuphea ingrata Cham. et Schltdl.
- Cuphea linarioides Cham. et Schltdl.
- Cuphea mesostemon Koehne
- Heimi myrtifolia Hort.Berol. ex Cham. et Schltdl.
- Lafoensia pacari A.St.-Hil.
- Lagerstroemia indica L.

== Magnoliaceae (Magnolia and tulip tree family) ==
- Liriodendron tulipifera L.

== Malpighiaceae ==
All the plants of this family are found in the neotropics.

- Banisteriopsis campestris (A.Juss.) Little
- Banisteriopsis clausseniana (A.Juss.) W.R.Anderson et B.Gates
- Banisteriopsis gardneriana (A.Juss.) W.R.Anderson et B.Gates
- Banisteriopsis pubipetala (Juss) Cuatrec.
- Byrsonima crassa Nied.
- Byrsonima crassifolia L.Rich
- Byrsonima coccolobifolia Kunth
- Byrsonima intermedia A.Juss.
- Byrsonima subterranea Brade et Markgr.
- Byrsonima verbascifolia Rich. ex Juss.
- Heteropteris aceroides Griseb.

== Malvaceae (Malva family) ==
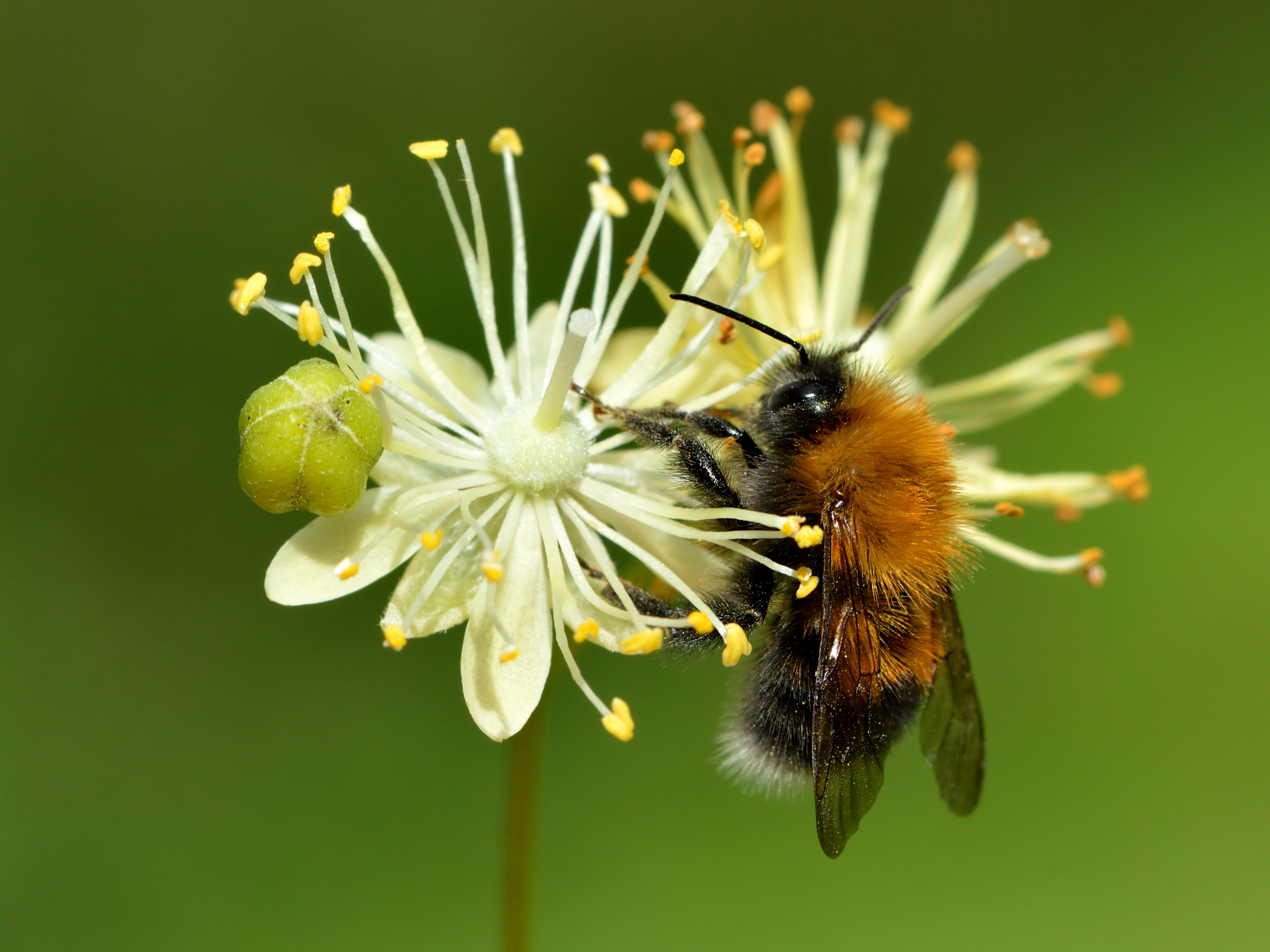
Tilia cordata

- Dombeya rotundifolia (Hochst.) Planch.
- Pavonia malvaviscoides A.St.-Hil.
- Pavonia rosa-campestris A.St.-Hil.
- Pavonia speciosa Kunth

== Meliaceae (Mahogany family) ==
- Cedrela fissilis Vell.
- Cedrela odorata Vell.

== Mimosoideae ==
- Acacia farnesiana (L.) Willd.
- Acacia paniculata Willd.
- Acacia plumosa Mart. ex Colla
- Albizia polyantha (Spreng.f.) G.P.Lewis (= Pithecelobium multiflorum (Kunth) Benth.)
- Albizia polycephala (Benth.) Killip ex Record (= Pithecellobium polycephalum Benth.)
- Anadenanthera colubrina (Vell.) Brenan var. cebil (Griseb.) Altschul (= Anadenanthera macrocarpa (Benth.) Brean)
- Anadenanthera contorta (Benth.) Brenan
- Anadenanthera falcata Speg. (= Piptadenia falcata Benth.)
- Anadenanthera peregrina Speg.
- Calliandra dysantha Benth.
- Enterolobium contortisiliquum (Vell.) Morong
- Enterolobium gummiferum (Mart.) Macbride
- Inga affinis DC.
- Inga edulis Mart.
- Inga marginata Willd.
- Inga paterno Harms
- Inga sessilis Mart.
- Leucaena glauca Benth.
- Mimosa acutistipula Benth.
- Mimosa bimucronata Kuntze
- Mimosa caesalpiniifolia Benth.
- Mimosa laticifera Rizzini et N.F.Mattos
- Mimosa multipinna Benth.
- Piptadenia gonoacantha Benth.
- Piptadenia paniculata Benth.
- Pithecolobium avaremotemo Mart.
- Pithecolobium diversifolium Benth.
- Pithecolobium dumosum Benth. (= Chloroleucon dumosum (Benth.) G.P.Lewis)
- Pithecellobium inopinatum (Harms) Ducke
- Stryphnodendron adstringens (Mart.) Coville
- Stryphnodendron obovatum Benth.

== Myrsinaceae ==
- Rapanea ferruginea Mez (= Caballeria ferruginea Ruiz et Pav.)
- Rapanea lancifolia Mez
- Rapanea umbellata Mez

== Myrtaceae (Myrtle family) ==
- Amomyrtus meli (Phil.) D.Legrand & Kausel
- Campomanesia adamantium Blume
- Campomanesia crenata O.Berg
- Campomanesia guazumaefolia Blume
- Campomanesia pubescens O.Berg
- Campomanesia xanthocarpa O.Berg
- Corymbia citriodora (Hook.) K.D. Hill & L.A. Johnson
- Genus Eucalyptus L'Her., especially the following species:

- Eucalyptus alba;
- Eucalyptus camaldulensis;
- Eucalyptus citriodora;
- Eucalyptus corymbosa;
- Eucalyptus drepanophylla;
- Eucalyptus globulus;
- Eucalyptus maculata;
- Eucalyptus melliodora;
- Eucalyptus microcorys;
- Eucalyptus oleosa;
- Eucalyptus paniculata;
- Eucalyptus citriodora;
- Eucalyptus redunca;
- Eucalyptus scabra;
- Eucalyptus tereticornis;
- Eucalyptus triantha;
- Eucalyptus wandoo.

- Eugenia brasiliensis Lam.
- Eugenia caryophyllata Thunb. (= Syzygium aromaticum (L.) Merr. et Perry)
- Eugenia convexinervia D.Legrand
- Eugenia dombeyana DC.
- Eugenia dysenterica DC.
- Eugenia hyemalis Cambess.
- Eugenia multicostata D.Legrand
- Eugenia pyriformis Cambess.
- Eugenia uniflora L.
- Myrceugenia euosma (O.Berg) D.Legrand
- Myrcia rostrata DC.
- Myrciaria cauliflora (Mart.) O.Berg
- Myrciaria glomerata O.Berg
- Leptospermum scoparium J.R.Forst. & G.Forst.
- Luma apiculata (DC.) Burret
- Metrosideros umbellata Cav.
- Psidium araca Raddi
- Psidium cinereum Mart. ex DC.
- Psidium firmum O.Berg
- Psidium guajava L.

== Ochnaceae ==
- Ouratea castaneifolia (DC.) Engl.
- Ouratea floribunda Engl.
- Ouratea spectabilis Engl.
- Ouratea nana Engl.

== Oleaceae (Olive family) ==
- Olea europaea L.
- Ligustrum imatophyllum
- Ligustrum japonicum Thunb.

== Oxalidaceae ==
- Averrhoa carambola L.

== Polygonaceae ==
- Antigonon leptopus — Hook. et Arn.
- Eriogonum fasciculatum— Benth.
- Eriogonum giganteum — S.Wats.
- Fagopyrum esculentum (buckwheat) — Moench
- Fagopyrum sagittatum — Gilib.
- Reynoutria japonica (syn. Polygonum cuspidatum) – Japanese knotweed

== Passifloraceae (Passion flower family) ==
- Passiflora haematostigma Mast.
- Passiflora pohlii Mast.

== Poaceae(Gramineae) ==
- Paspalum notatum Flüggé
- Saccharum officinarum L.
- Zea mays L.

== Proteaceae ==
- Banksia integrifolia L.f.
- Banksia sessilis (Knight) A.R.Mast & K.R.Thiele
- Gevuina (Molina) Gaertn.
- Grevillea banksii R.Br.
- Grevillea robusta A.Cunn. ex R.Br.
- Grevillea rosmarinifolia A.Cunn.
- Grevillea thelemanniana Hueg.
- Protea repens
- Protea cynaroides
- Roupala brasiliensis Klotzsch
- Roupala cataractarum Sleumer
- Roupala heterophylla hl
- Roupala montana Willd.
- Roupala tomentosa Pohl
- Knightia excelsa R. Br.

== Rhamnaceae (Buckthorn family) ==
- Rhamnus frangula
- Ceanothus tomentosus

== Rosaceae (Rose family) ==
- Eriobotrya japonica (Thunb.) Lindl.
- Prunus amygdalus L.
- Prunus armeniaca L.
- Prunus avium (L.) L.
- Prunus domestica L.
- Prunus persica (L.) Batsch
- Pyrus communis L.

== Rubiaceae (Madder, bedstraw, coffee family) ==
- Alibertia sessilis K.Schum.
- Borreria verticillata G.Mey.
- Borreria latifolia K.Schum.
- Borreria suaveolens G.Mey.
- Borreria verbenoides Cham. et Schltdl.
- Cephalanthus occidentalis L.
- Chinchona spp. L.
- Coffea arabica L.
- Coutarea hexandra (Jacq.) K.Schum.

== Rutaceae ==
- Genus Citrus L., especially the following species:

- Citrus aurantifolia Swingle
- Citrus limonum Risso
- Citrus medica L.
- Citrus reticulata Blanco
- Citrus sinensis (L.) Osbeck

- Murraya paniculata (L.) Jack

== Salicaceae (Willow and poplar family) ==
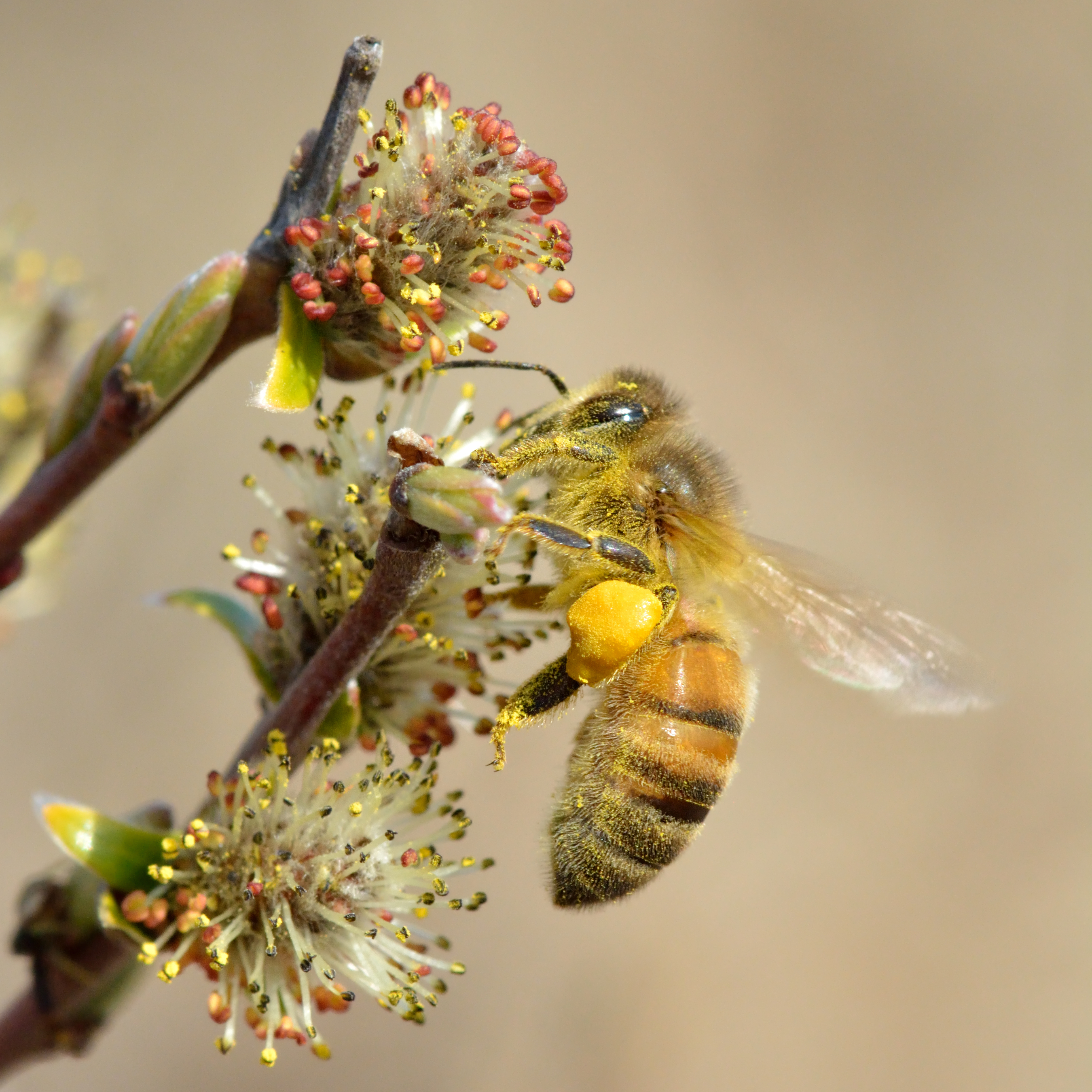
Salix rosmarinifolia

- Salix amygdaloides Andersson
- Salix bebbiana Sarg.
- Salix caprea L.
- Salix discolor Muhl.
- Salix nigra Marshall
- Banara parviflora Benth.
- Casearia decandra Jacq.
- Casearia sylvestris Sw.

== Sapindaceae (Soapberry family) ==
- Cupania oblongifolia Mart.
- Cupania vernalis Cambess.
- Dodonaea viscosa Mart.
- Magonia pubescens A.St.-Hil.
- Matayba guianensis Aubl.
- Serjania erecta Radlk.
- Serjania grandifolia Sagot ex Radlk.

== Scrophulariaceae ==
- Buddleja brasiliensis Jacq.
- Buddleja davidii
- Scrophularia californica Cham. et Schltdl.

== Solanaceae (Tomato, potato, egg plant family) ==
- Acnistus arborescens Schltdl.
- Acnistus cauliflorus Schott
- Solanum paniculatum L.

== Styracaceae ==
- Styrax camporum Pohl
- Styrax ferrugineus Nees et Mart.

== Sterculiaceae ==
- Guazuma ulmifolia Lam.
- Sterculia striata A.St.-Hil. et Naudin
- Dombeya natalensis Sond.
- Dombeya wallichii Benth. et Hook.f.
- Waltheria tomentosa (J.R. et G.Forst.) H.St.John

== Tamaricaceae ==
- Tamarix gallica L.

== Tiliaceae (Basswood, linden family) ==
- Luehea candicans Mart.
- Luehea divaricata Mart.
- Luehea grandiflora Mart.
- Luehea paniculata Mart.
- Luehea rufescens A.St.-Hil.
- Triumfetta semitriloba Jacq.

== Urticaceae (Nettle family) ==
- Boehmeria caudata Sw.

== Verbenaceae (Verbena family) ==
- Aegiphila lhotskiana Cham.
- Aegiphila tomentosa Cham.
- Aloysia virgata (Ruiz et Pav.) Juss. (= Lippia urticoides (Cham.) Steud.)
- Lantana camara L.
- Lantana lilacina Desf.
- Lantana trifolia L.
- Lippia alba N.E.Br. ex Britton et P.Wilson
- Lippia candicans Hayek
- Petrea subserrata Cham.
- Petrea volubilis L.
- Zapania citriodora Lam. (= Lippia citriodora (Lam.) Kunth)

== Vochysiaceae ==
All the plants of this family are found in the neotropics.

- Qualea grandifolia Mart.
- Qualea multiflora Mart.
- Qualea parviflora Mart.

== See also ==
- Toxic honey plants, whose nectar results in toxic honey
- Forage (honeybee)
- Honeydew source
- Nectar source
- Northern American nectar sources for honey bees
- Pollen source
- Melliferous flower
- Regional honeys
