= Stryphnodendron obovatum =

Conservation status
- Least Concern (IUCN 3.1)

Scientific classification
- Kingdom: Plantae
- Clade: Tracheophytes
- Clade: Angiosperms
- Clade: Eudicots
- Clade: Rosids
- Order: Fabales
- Family: Fabaceae
- Subfamily: Caesalpinioideae
- Clade: Mimosoid clade
- Genus: Stryphnodendron
- Species: S. obovatum

Binomial name
- Stryphnodendron obovatum Bentham (1875)

Species of legume

Stryphnodendron obovatum (Portuguese: barbatimão) is a species of legume in the family Fabaceae. It is native to the cerrado (savanna) of Brazil while it also occurs in Bolivia and Paraguay. A perennial shrub, it is about 3 to 4 m (9.8 to 13.1 feet) in height.

The bark of S. obovatum shows antioxidant, antibacterial, and wound healing properties. Its bark also contains between 12 and 19 per cent of tannins which is used in traditional medicine in Brazil to treat diseases such as leukorrhea and diarrhea. The bark extracts are also used to treat ulcer and protozoan infections caused by Trypanosoma and Leishmania. A study in 2004 showed that the seeds of S. obovatum in saline extract did not show any of the above properties but it exhibited enzymatic activity and a significant protein content.

The species has one synonym known as Stryphnodendron rotundifolium var. rotundifolium.
