= Ilex theezans =

Scientific classification
- Kingdom: Plantae
- Clade: Tracheophytes
- Clade: Angiosperms
- Clade: Eudicots
- Clade: Asterids
- Order: Aquifoliales
- Family: Aquifoliaceae
- Genus: Ilex
- Species: I. theezans

Binomial name
- Ilex theezans Mart.

Species of holly

Ilex theezans, also I. theæzans and I. theazans, is a species of the genus Ilex in the family Aquifoliaceae, native to Brazil and typically found in its Atlantic Forest. It is sometimes used as an adulterant of mate and sometimes confused with the yerba mate (I. paraguarensis). In Brazil, it is sometimes called orelha-de-mico; but is more often simply known as congonha ("holly") or caúna (along with I. dumosa.

The species includes the subspecies I. theezans hieronymiana; the varieties I. theezans var. acrodonta, augusti, fertilis, gracilior, grandifolia, leptopylla, pachypylla, typica, and warmingiana; and the forms I. theezans f. glabra and puberula.
