= Smilax medica =

Smilax medica can refer to:

- Smilax medica G.Kirchn., a synonym of Smilax tamnoides L.
- Smilax medica M.Martens & Galeotti, a synonym of Smilax bona-nox L.
- Smilax medica Schltdl. & Cham., a synonym of Smilax aristolochiifolia Mill.
