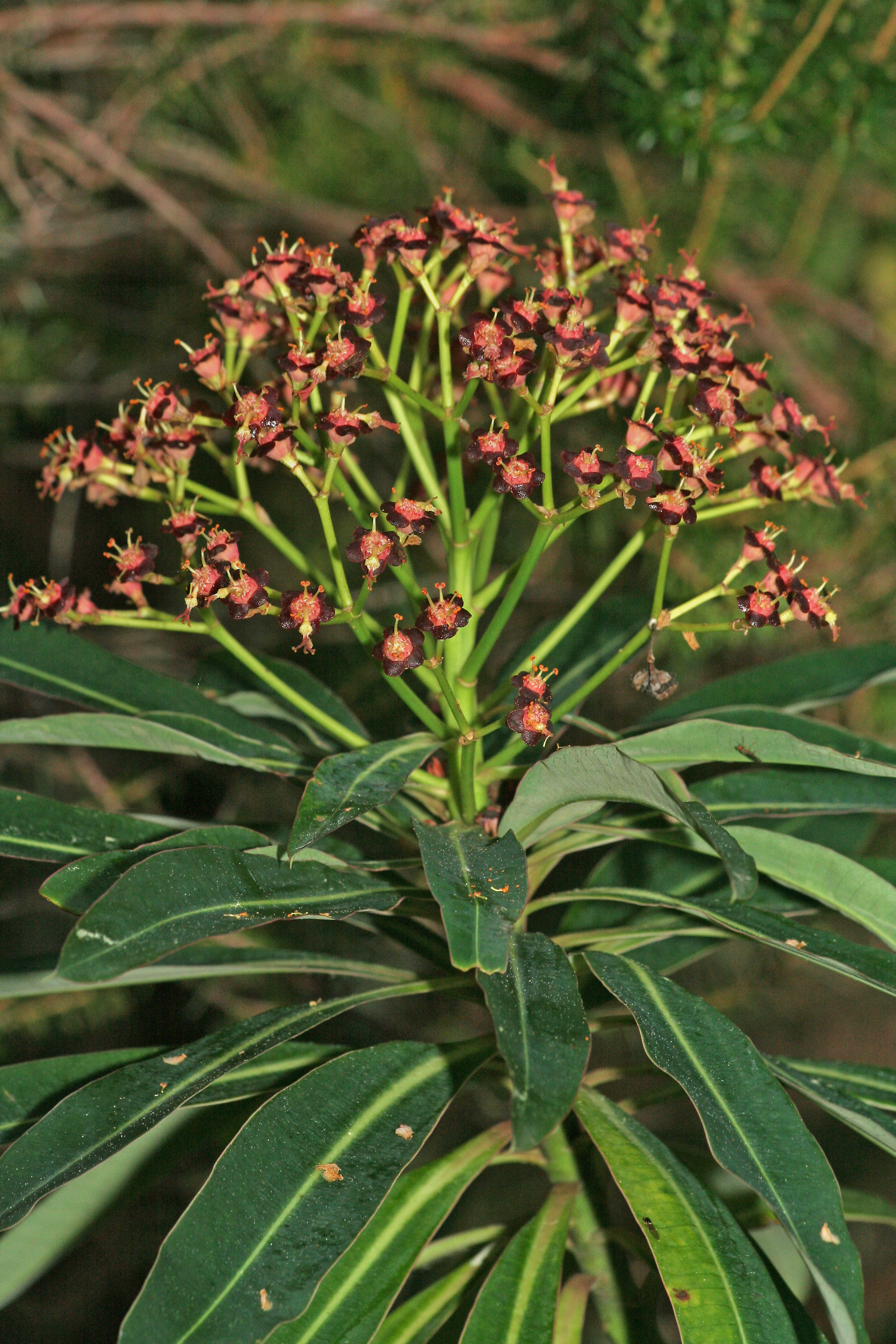

Conservation status
- Least Concern (IUCN 3.1)

Scientific classification
- Kingdom: Plantae
- Clade: Embryophytes
- Clade: Tracheophytes
- Clade: Spermatophytes
- Clade: Angiosperms
- Clade: Eudicots
- Clade: Rosids
- Order: Malpighiales
- Family: Euphorbiaceae
- Genus: Euphorbia
- Species: E. mellifera

Binomial name
- Euphorbia mellifera Aiton

Synonyms
- Euphorbia longifolia Lam.; Euphorbia longifolia var. canariensis (Boiss.) Oudejans; Euphorbia mellifera var. canariensis Boiss.; Kobiosis mellifera (Aiton) Raf.; Tithymalus melliferus (Aiton) Moench

= Euphorbia mellifera =

Species of flowering plant in the spurge family

Euphorbia mellifera, the Canary spurge or honey spurge, is a species of flowering plant in the spurge family Euphorbiaceae, native to Madeira and the Canary Islands. It is an evergreen shrub or tree growing to 2.5 m (8.2 ft) tall and broad, with narrow leaves up to 20 cm (8 in) long. In spring it produces brown, honey-scented flowers.

The Latin specific epithet mellifera means "producing honey".

It has gained the Royal Horticultural Society's Award of Garden Merit. Euphorbia × pasteurii is listed as a hybrid between E. mellifera and E. stygiana. The cultivars 'Phrampton Phatty', 'Roundway Titan' and 'John Phillips' have received the RHS AGM.

Like all euphorbias, this plant contains a milky-white sap, which oozes out of the stems when cut. This can be a skin irritant and is very harmful to the eyes. Gloves should be worn when pruning,
