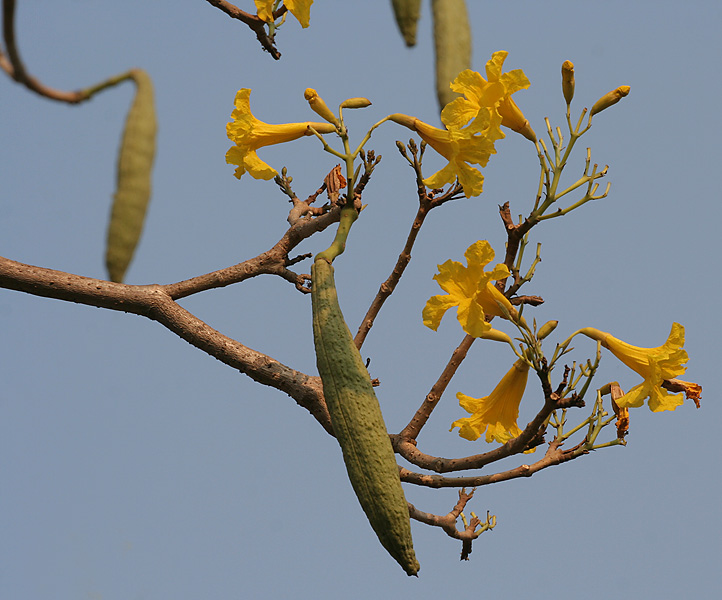
- Tabebuia aurea

Scientific classification
- Kingdom: Plantae
- Clade: Tracheophytes
- Clade: Angiosperms
- Clade: Eudicots
- Clade: Asterids
- Order: Lamiales
- Family: Bignoniaceae
- Clade: Crescentiina
- Clade: Tabebuia alliance
- Genus: Tabebuia; Gomes ex A.P. de Candolle

Type species
- Tabebuia cassinoides A.P. de Candolle

Species
- Approximately 67 species (see text)

Synonyms
- Leucoxylon Raf.; Potamoxylon Raf.; Proterpia Raf.; Couralia Splitg.

= Tabebuia =

Genus of flowering plants

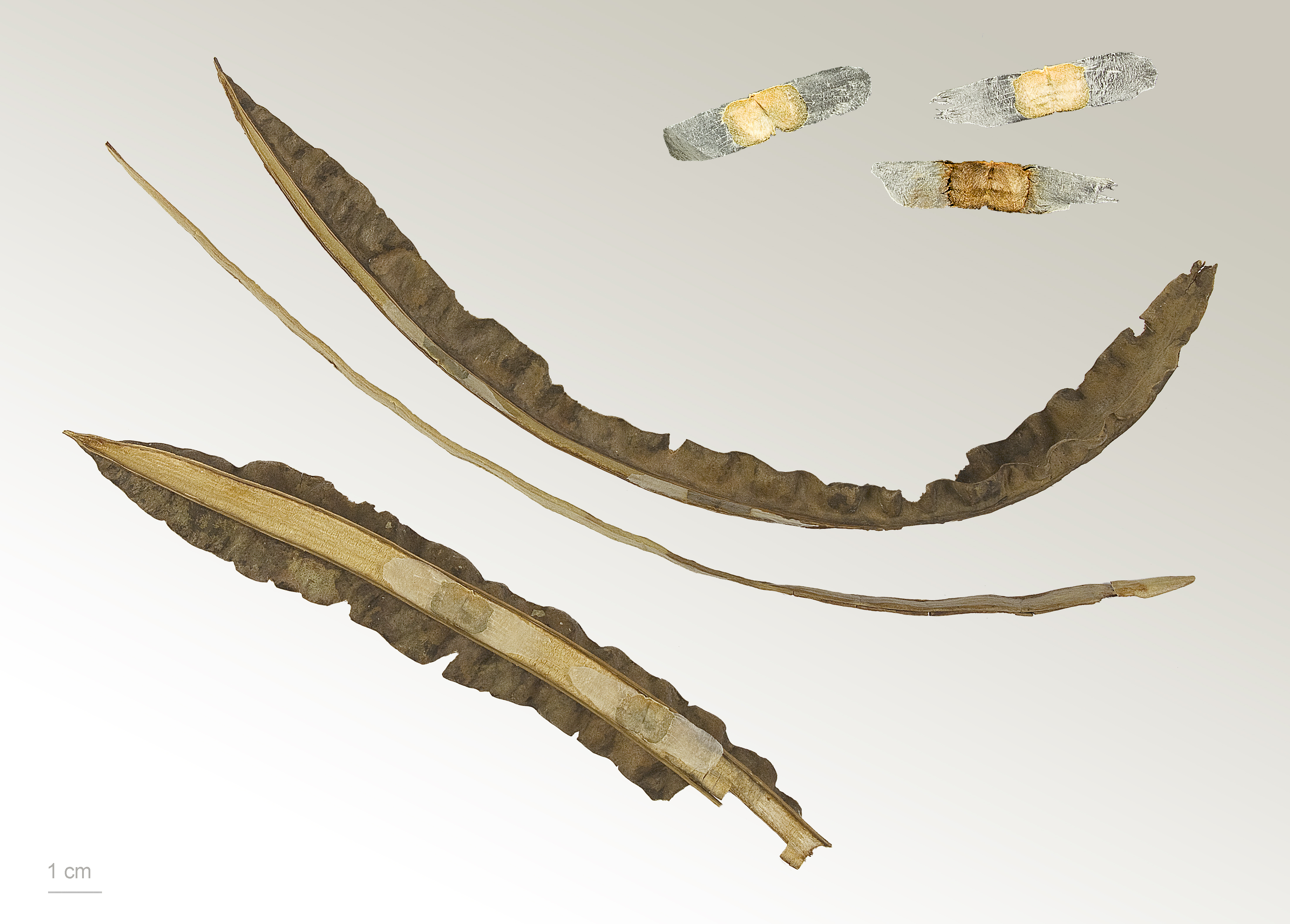
Three seeds with septum and valves of split pod of Tabebuia sp. at MHNT

Tabebuia is a genus of flowering plants in the family Bignoniaceae. Tabebuia consists almost entirely of trees, but a few are often large shrubs. A few species produce timber, but the genus is mostly known for those that are cultivated as flowering trees.

== Etymology ==
The genus name is derived from the Tupi words for "ant" and "wood", referring to the fact that many Tabebuia species have twigs with soft pith which forms hollows within which ants live, defending the trees from other herbivores. The ants are attracted to the plants by special extra-floral nectar glands on at the apex of the petioles. The common name "roble" is sometimes found in English. Tabebuias have been called "trumpet trees", but this name is usually applied to other trees and has become a source of confusion and misidentification.

== Distribution ==
Tabebuia is native to the American tropics and subtropics from Mexico and the Caribbean to Argentina. Most of the species known are from the islands of Cuba and Hispaniola. It is commonly cultivated and often naturalized or adventive beyond its natural range. It easily escapes cultivation because of its numerous, air-borne seeds.

== Taxonomy ==
In 1992, a revision of Tabebuia described 99 species and one hybrid. Phylogenetic studies of DNA sequences later showed that Tabebuia, as then circumscribed, was polyphyletic. In 2007, it was divided into three separate genera. Primavera (Roseodendron donnell-smithii) and a related species with no unique common name (Roseodendron chryseum) were transferred to Roseodendron. Those species known as ipê and pau d'arco (in Portuguese) or poui were transferred to Handroanthus. Sixty-seven species remained in Tabebuia. The former genus and polyphyletic group of 99 species described by Gentry in 1992 is now usually referred to as "Tabebuia sensu lato".

=== Species ===
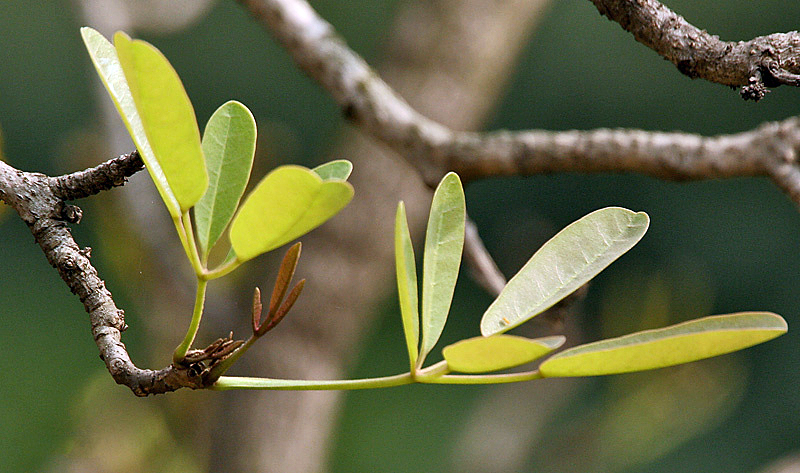
Young leaves of Tabebuia aurea

All of the species in the first two columns below were recognized and described by Gentry in 1992. Listed in the third column are species names that have been used recently, but were not accepted by Gentry. The currently accepted synonym for each is in parentheses.

Some recently used names in Tabebuia that were not recognized by Gentry are not listed in the third column below because they apply to species that are now in Handroanthus. Tabebuia spectabilis is an obsolete name for Handroanthus chrysanthus subsp. meridionalis. Tabebuia ecuadorensis is now synonymized under Handroanthus billbergii. Tabebuia heteropoda is now synonymized under Handroanthus ochraceus.

No species that is now assigned to Roseodendron or to Handroanthus is listed below.

Authorities are cited for some of the names below. These can be found in Gentry (1992) or at the International Plant Names Index.

- Tabebuia acrophylla
- Tabebuia angustata
- Tabebuia arimaoensis Britton
- Tabebuia aurea – Caribbean trumpet tree
- Tabebuia berteroi
- Tabebuia bibracteolata (Grisebach) Britton
- Tabebuia bullata
- Tabebuia cassinoides (Lam.) DC.
- Tabebuia conferta
- Tabebuia dubia (C.Wright ex Sauvalle) Britton ex Seibert
- Tabebuia elliptica
- Tabebuia elongata
- Tabebuia fluviatilis
- Tabebuia haemantha
- Tabebuia heterophylla – pink manjack, pink trumpet tree, white cedar, and whitewood
- Tabebuia hypoleuca
- Tabebuia insignis
- Tabebuia jackiana
- Tabebuia karsoana
- Tabebuia maxonii
- Tabebuia microphylla
- Tabebuia myrtifolia
- Tabebuia nodosa
- Tabebuia obtusifolia
- Tabebuia orinocensis (Sandwith) A.H. Gentry
- Tabebuia pallida
- Tabebuia palustris
- Tabebuia pilosa
- Tabebuia platyantha
- Tabebuia polymorpha
- Tabebuia rosea DC. – pink poui and rosy trumpet tree
- Tabebuia roseo-alba – white ipê
- Tabebuia schumanniana
- Tabebuia shaferi
- Tabebuia stenocalyx
- Tabebuia striata
- T. anafensis Urb. (T. myrtifolia var. petrophila)
- T. aquatilis (T. fluviatilis)
- T. argentea (T. aurea)
- T. furfuracea (T. bibracteolata)
- T. lapacho
- T. leucoxyla (T. obtusifolia)
- T. ochracea
- T. oligolepis (T. shaferi)
- T. pentaphylla (T. rosea)
- T. uliginosa (T. cassinoides)

=== Taxonomic history ===
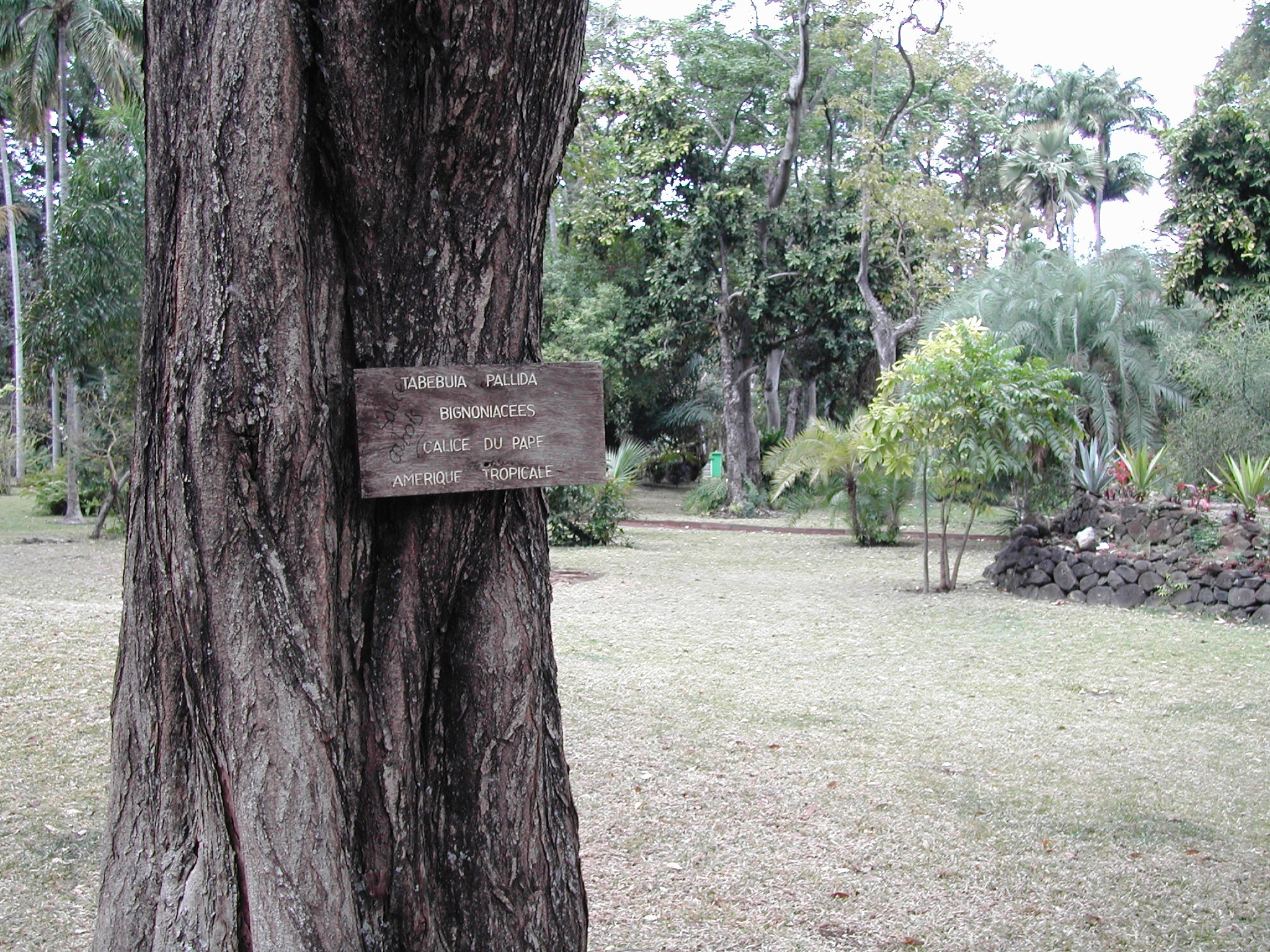
Trunk of Tabebuia pallida

The name Tabebuia entered the botanical literature in 1803, when António Bernardino Gomes used it as a common name for Tabebuia uliginosa, now a synonym for Tabebuia cassinoides, which he described as a species of Bignonia. Tabebuia is an abbreviation of "tacyba bebuya", a Tupi name meaning "ant wood". Among the Indigenous peoples in Brazil, similar names exist for various species of Tabebuia.

Tabebuia was first used as a generic name by Augustin Pyramus de Candolle in 1838. The type species for the genus is Tabebuia uliginosa, which is now a synonym for Tabebuia cassinoides. Confusion soon ensued over the meaning of Tabebuia and what to include within it. Most of the misunderstanding was cleared up by Nathaniel Lord Britton in 1915. Britton revived the concept of Tabebuia that had been originated in 1876 by Bentham and Hooker, consisting of species with either simple or palmately compound leaves. Similar plants with pinnately compound leaves were placed in Tecoma. This is the concept of Tabebuia that was usually followed until 2007.

The genus Roseodendron was established by Faustino Miranda González in 1965 for the two species now known as Roseodendron donnell-smithii and Roseodendron chryseum. These species had been placed in Cybistax by Russell J. Seibert in 1940, but were returned to Tabebuia by Alwyn H. Gentry in 1992.

Handroanthus was established by Joáo Rodrigues de Mattos in 1970. Gentry did not agree with the segregation of Handroanthus from Tabebuia and warned against "succumbing to further paroxysms of unwarranted splitting". In 1992, Gentry published a revision of Tabebuia in Flora Neotropica, in which he described 99 species and one hybrid, including those species placed by some authors in Roseodendron or Handroanthus. Gentry divided Tabebuia into ten "species groups", some of them intentionally artificial. Tabebuia, as currently circumscribed, consists of groups 2, 6, 7, 8, 9, and 10. Group 1 is now the genus Roseodendron. Groups 3, 4, and 5 compose the genus Handroanthus.

In 2007, a molecular phylogenetic study found Handroanthus to be closer to a certain group of four genera than to Tabebuia. This group consists of Spirotecoma, Parmentiera, Crescentia, and Amphitecna. A phylogenetic tree can be seen at Bignoniaceae. Handroanthus was duly resurrected and 30 species were assigned to it, with species boundaries the same as those of Gentry (1992).

Roseodendron was resolved as sister to a clade consisting of Handroanthus and four other genera. This result had only weak statistical support, but Roseodendron clearly did not group with the remainder of Tabebuia. Consequently, Roseodendron was resurrected in its original form. The remaining 67 species of Tabebuia formed a strongly supported clade that is sister to Ekmanianthe, a genus of two species from Cuba and Hispaniola. Tabebuia had been traditionally placed in the tribe Tecomeae, but that tribe is now defined much more narrowly than it had been, and it now excludes Tabebuia. Tabebuia is now one of 12 to 14 genera belonging to a group that is informally called the Tabebuia alliance. This group has not been placed at any particular taxonomic rank.

Cladistic analysis of DNA data has strongly supported Tabebuia by Bayesian inference and maximum parsimony. Such studies have so far revealed almost nothing about relationships within the genus, placing nearly all of the sampled species in a large polytomy.

== Description ==
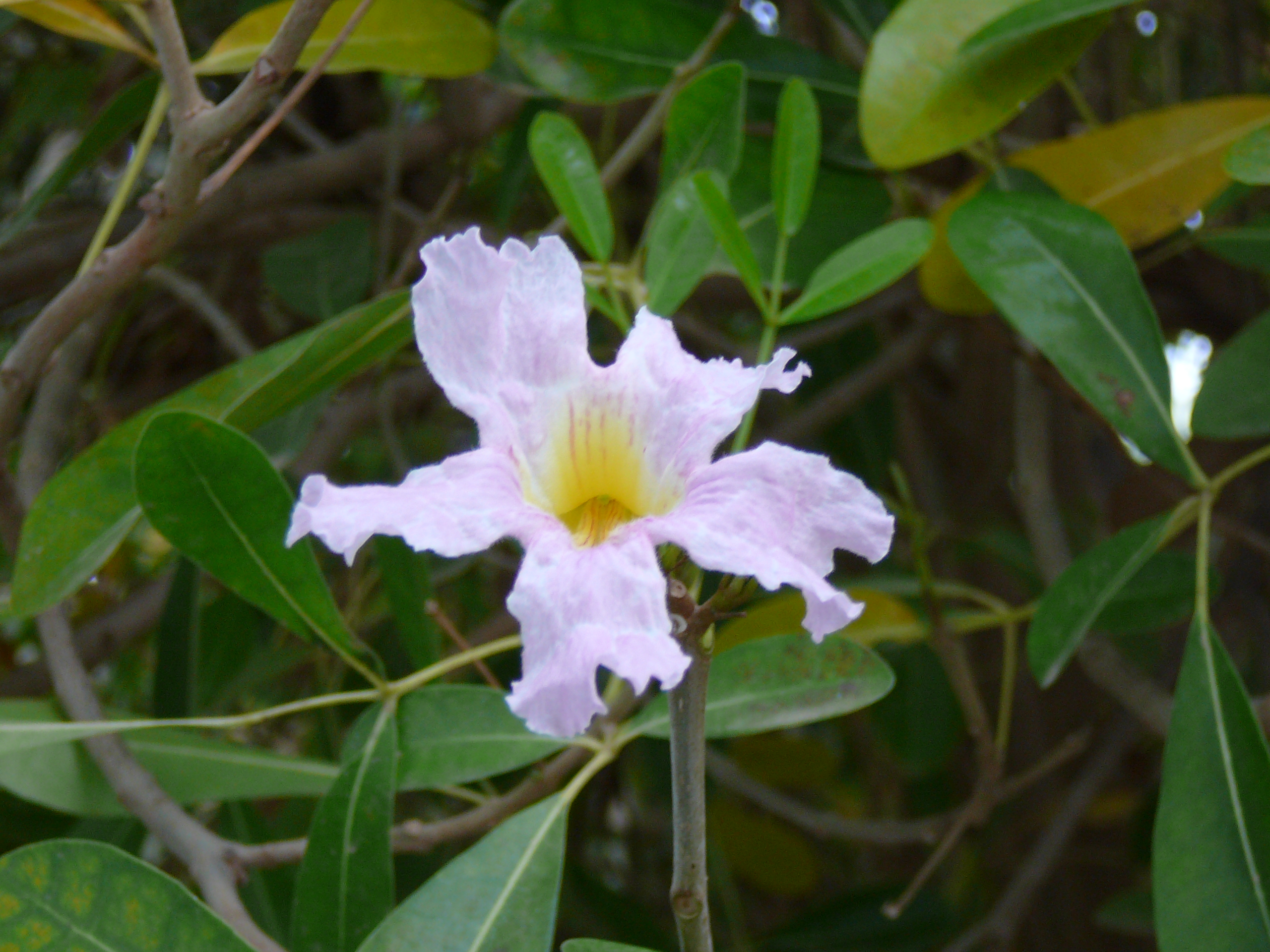
Flower of Pink Poui (Tabebuia rosea)

The description below is excerpted from Grose and Olmstead (2007).

- Trees or shrubs. Evergreen or dry season deciduous.
- Wood lacking lapachol; not especially dense or hard. Heartwood light brown to reddish brown, not distinct from sapwood.
- Leaves sometimes simple; usually palmately 3 to 7(9)-foliate; with stalked or sessile lepidote scales.
- Inflorescences usually few-flowered panicles, dichotomously branching, without a well-developed, central rachis.
- Calyx coriaceous, spathaceous; irregularly 2 to 3-labiate, rarely 5-dentate.
- Corolla yellow in two species (T. aurea and T. nodosa); otherwise white to pink, rarely red, often with a yellow throat.
- Stamens didynamous; staminode small.
- Ovary linear, bilocular.
- Ovules in two or three series in each locule.
- Fruit a dehiscent capsule, usually linear, sometimes ribbed, glabrous except for lepidote scales.
- Seeds thin, with two wings; wings hyaline, membranaceous, and sharply demarcated from the seed body.

Tabebuia is distinguished from Handroanthus by wood that is not especially hard or heavy, and not abruptly divided into heartwood and sapwood. Lapachol is absent. Scales are present, but no hair. The calyx is usually spathaceous in Tabebuia, but never so in Handroanthus. Only two species of Tabebuia are yellow-flowered, but most species of Handroanthus are.

Unlike Roseodendron, the calyx of Tabebuia is always distinctly harder and thicker than the corolla. Tabebuia always has a dichotomously branched inflorescence; never a central rachis as in Roseodendron. Some species of Tabebuia have ribbed fruit, but not as conspicuously so as the two species of Roseodendron.

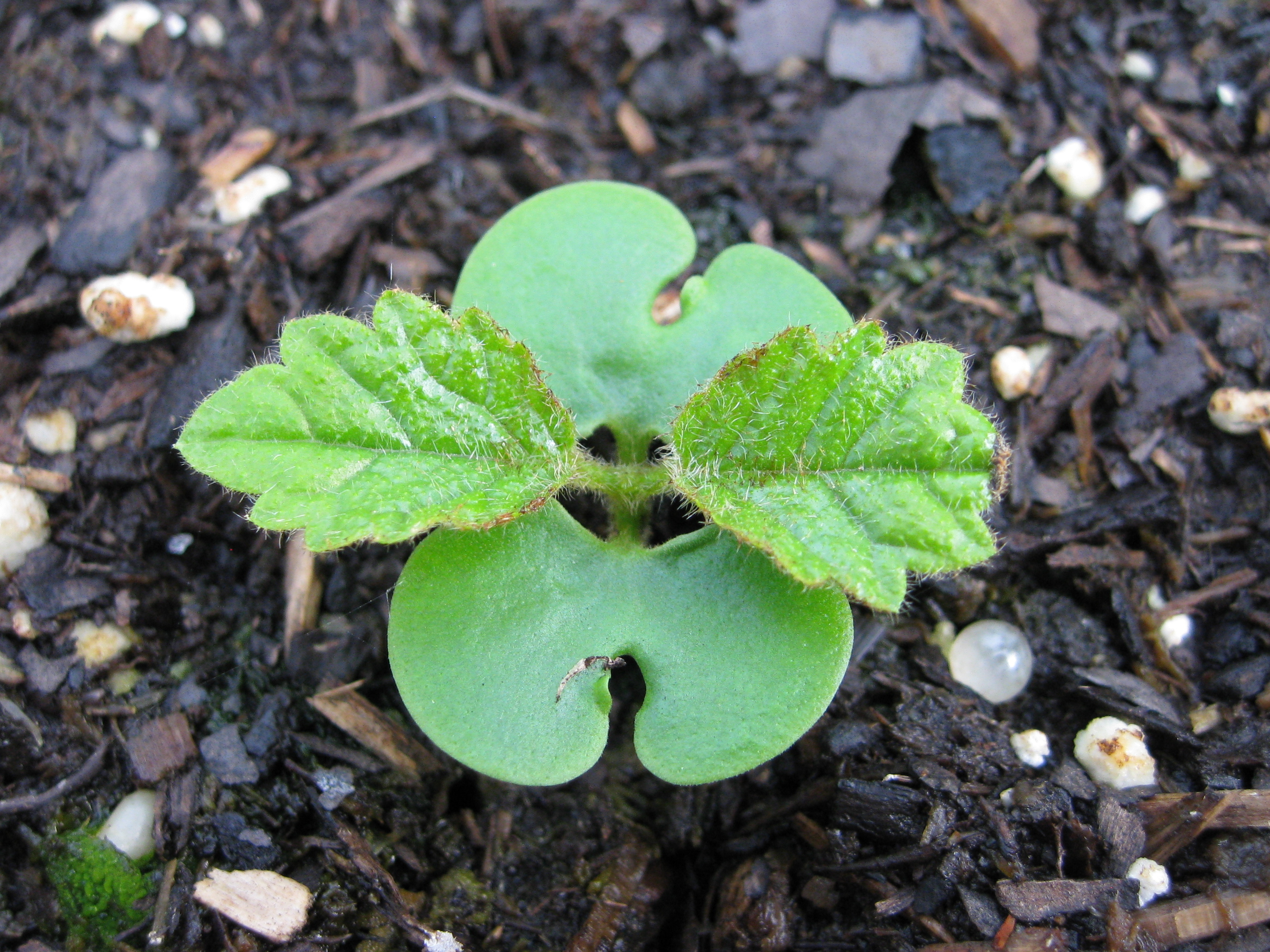
Tabebuia sprout

== Uses ==
The wood of Tabebuia is light to medium in weight. Tabebuia rosea (including T. pentaphylla) is an important timber tree of tropical America. Tabebuia heterophylla and Tabebuia angustata are the most important timber trees of some of the Caribbean islands. Their wood is of medium weight and is exceptionally durable in contact with salt water.

The swamp species of Tabebuia have wood that is unusually light in weight. The most prominent example of these is Tabebuia cassinoides. Its roots produce a soft and spongy wood that is used for floats, razor strops, and the inner soles of shoes.

In spite of its use for lumber, Tabebuia is best known as an ornamental flowering tree. Tabebuia aurea, Tabebuia rosea, Tabebuia pallida, Tabebuia berteroi, and Tabebuia heterophylla are cultivated throughout the tropics for their showy flowers. Tabebuia dubia, Tabebuia haemantha, Tabebuia obtusifolia, Tabebuia nodosa, and Tabebuia roseo-alba are also known in cultivation and are sometimes locally abundant.

Some species of Tabebuia have been grown as honey plants by beekeepers.

== Ecology ==
The nectar of Tabebuia flowers is an important food source for several species of bees and hummingbirds.

== Symbolism ==
Tabebuia rosea is the national tree of El Salvador and the state tree of Cojedes, Venezuela.

== Gallery of Tabebuia flowers ==
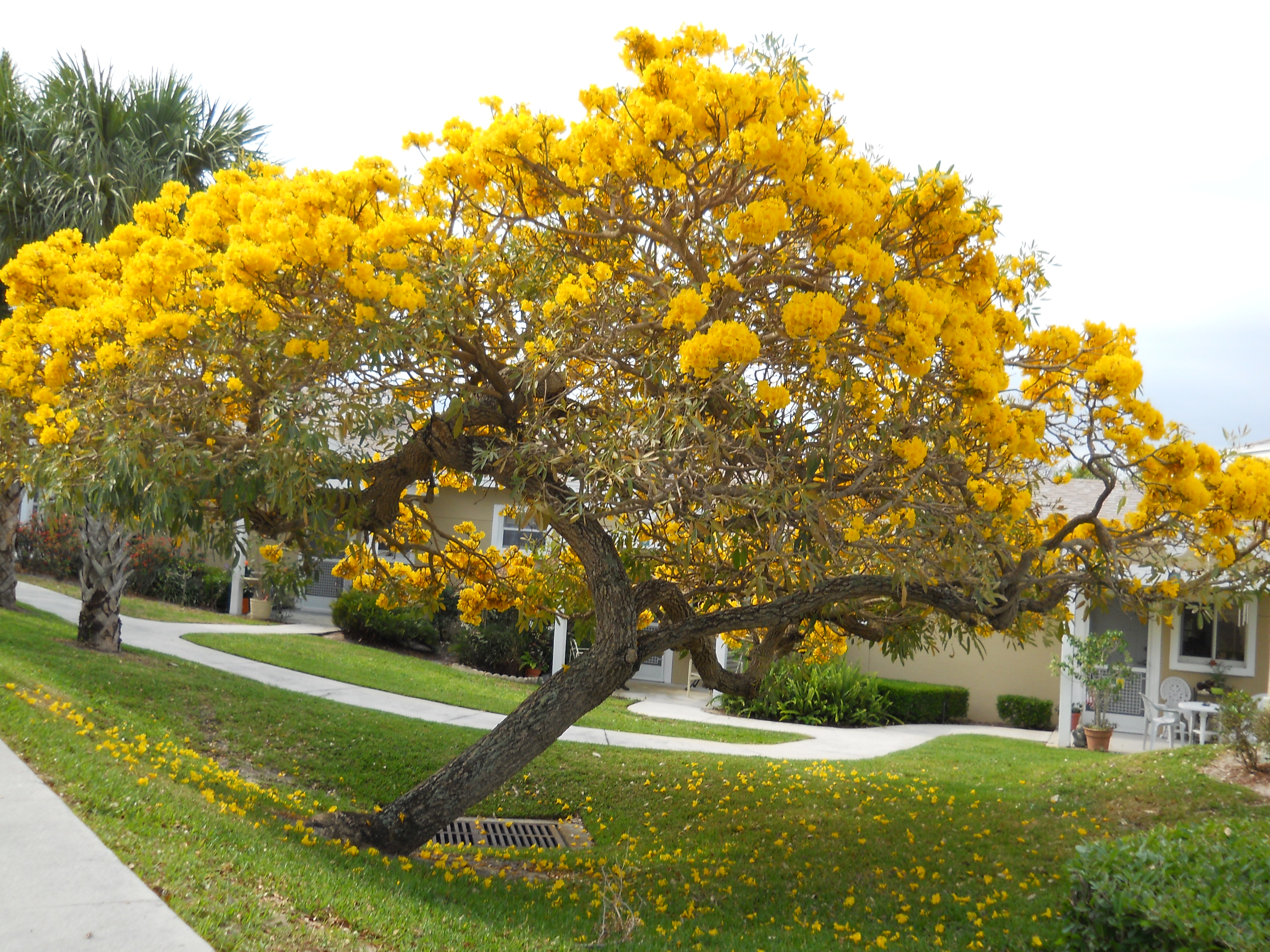
Tabebuia aurea

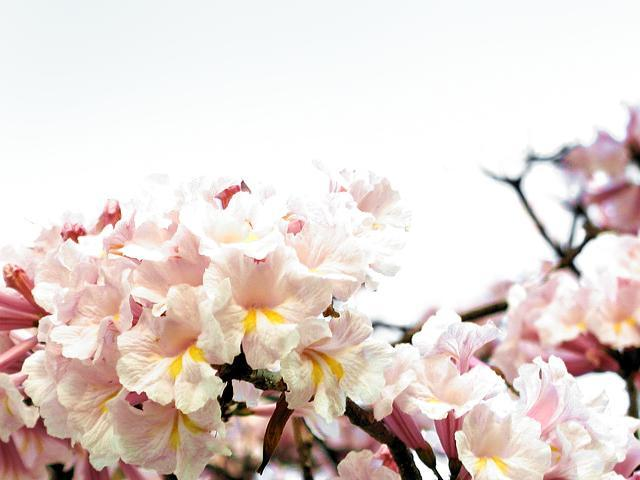
Tabebuia roseo-alba

Tabebuia impetiginosa at Disneyland

== Sources ==
- Lorenzi, H. (1992): Árvores brasileiras: manual de identificação e cultivo de plantas arbóreas nativas do Brasil.
