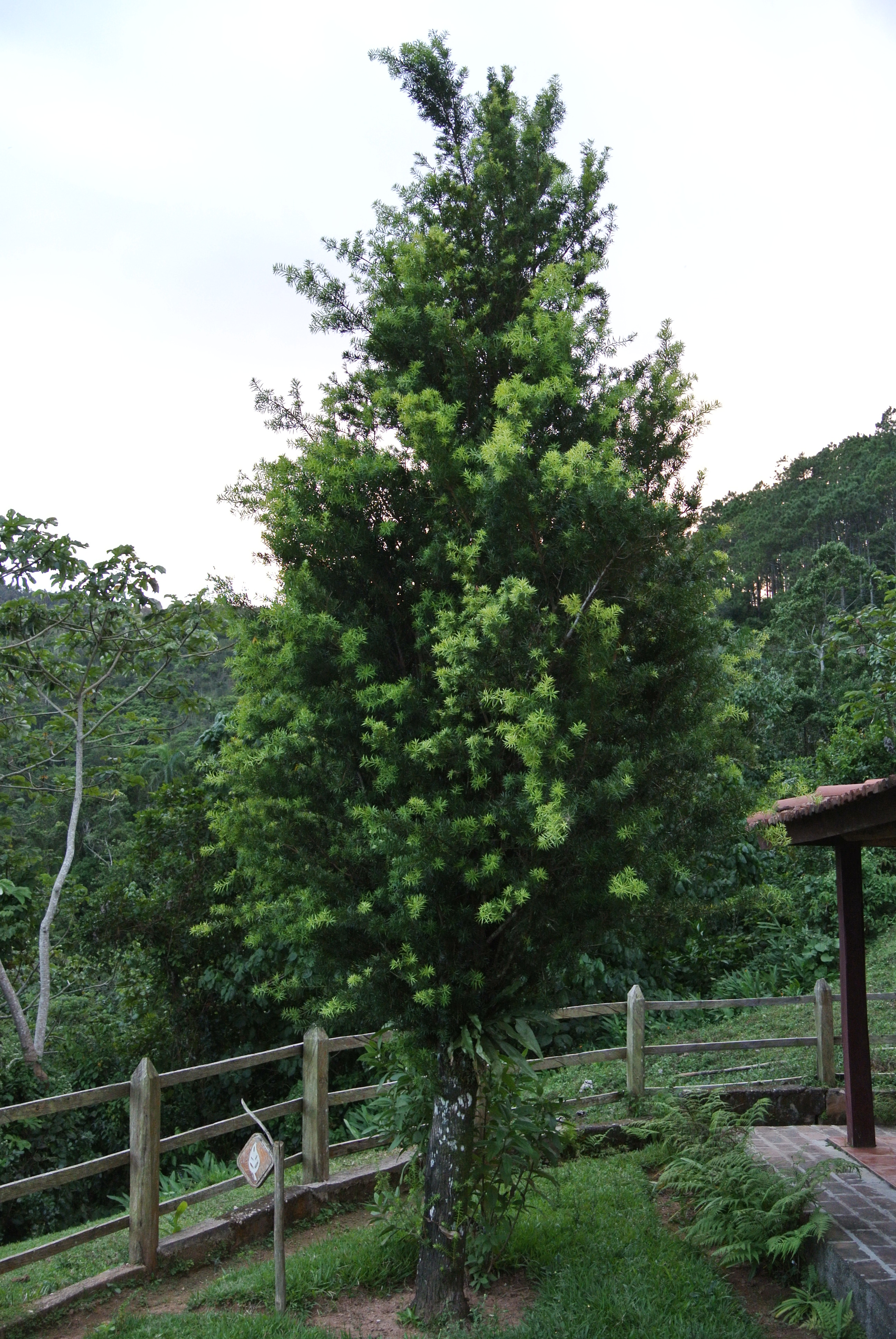

Conservation status
- Vulnerable (IUCN 3.1)

Scientific classification
- Kingdom: Plantae
- Clade: Tracheophytes
- Clade: Gymnosperms
- Division: Pinophyta
- Class: Pinopsida
- Order: Araucariales
- Family: Podocarpaceae
- Genus: Podocarpus
- Species: P. angustifolius

Binomial name
- Podocarpus angustifolius Griseb.

= Podocarpus angustifolius =

Species of conifer

Podocarpus angustifolius is a species of conifer in the family Podocarpaceae. It is endemic to Cuba.

It is a shrub or tree growing up to 12 meters tall. It grows in mountain pine forests and rainforests on the eastern end of the island of Cuba. It can be found in pine forest on sandstone soils alongside Pinus cubensis, Brunella comocladifolia, Cyrilla nipensis, Myrsine coriacea, Tabebuia hypoleuca, tree ferns and shrubs. In rainforest habitat it grows on serpentine soils with other species that include Byrsonima orientensis, Guatteria moralesii, Mozartia gundlachii, Octoea moaensis, Podocarpus ekmanii, and Solonea curatellifolia.

This conifer and its habitat are threatened by fire and mining activity, especially nickel mining.
