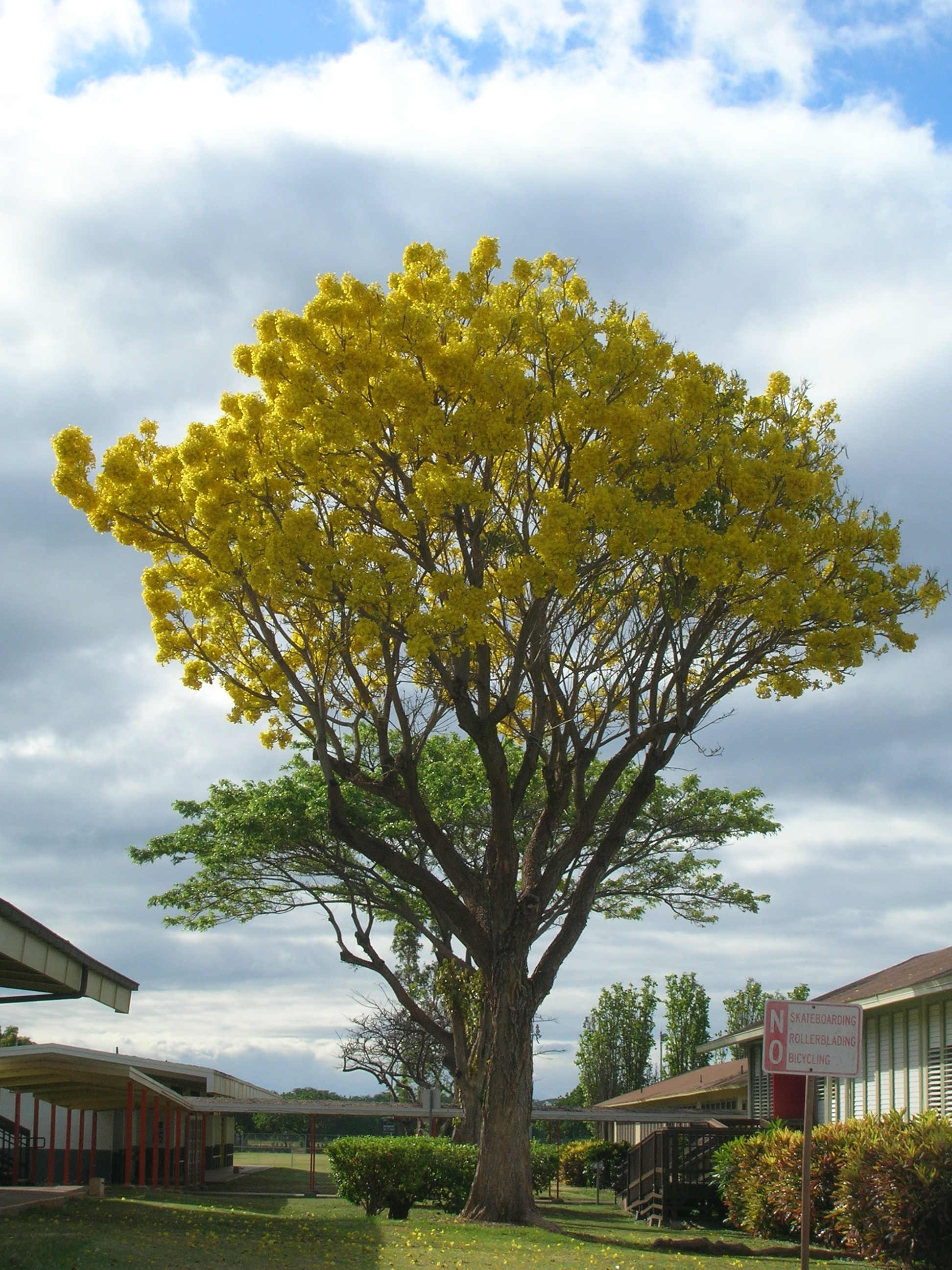
- Roseodendron donnell-smithii (syn. Tabebuia donnell-smithii)

Scientific classification
- Kingdom: Plantae
- Clade: Tracheophytes
- Clade: Angiosperms
- Clade: Eudicots
- Clade: Asterids
- Order: Lamiales
- Family: Bignoniaceae
- Clade: Crescentiina
- Clade: Tabebuia alliance
- Genus: Roseodendron; Miranda

Type species
- Roseodendron donnell-smithii (Rose) Miranda

Species
- Roseodendron donnell-smithii; Roseodendron chryseum

= Roseodendron =

Genus of flowering plants

Roseodendron is a genus of flowering plants in the family Bignoniaceae. It consists of two species, Roseodendron donnell-smithii and Roseodendron chryseum. The type species for the genus is R. donnell-smithii. Both species are cultivated as ornamentals for their numerous, large, yellow flowers.

Roseodendron donnell-smithii is known colloquially as primavera. It is the larger and more frequently planted of the two species. Its wood is sometimes used to make furniture. It is native to Central America and southern Mexico, but it is also grown throughout the tropics.

Roseodendron chryseum is endemic to the dry forests of northern Colombia and northwestern Venezuela. It is known as araguaney, a name that also applies to Handroanthus chrysanthus. It differs from R. donnell-smithii in its smaller stature, smaller fruit, and more compact inflorescence. The inflorescence is a panicle, but appears racemose because of the short lateral branches and pedicels.

Both species have been placed in Cybistax and in Tabebuia, and they were thought to be closely related to Handroanthus. In 2007, a molecular phylogenetic study showed that Roseodendron is not closer to Tabebuia than Ekmanianthe, not closer to Cybistax than are Godmania and Zeyheria, and not closer to Handroanthus than are Spirotecoma, Parmentiera, Crescentia, and Amphitecna. The authors recommended that Roseodendron be resurrected from Tabebuia, under which most authors of that time had synonymized it.

== Description ==
- The wood is not especially heavy or hard, like that of Handroanthus.
- The indumentum is of lepidote scales and small glandular hairs.
- The inflorescence has an erect and sturdy central rachis.
- The calyx is spathaceous, usually somewhat viscid, and is soft and thin like the corolla.
- The corolla is yellow and sometimes has thin, red lines.
- The fruit is bullate and irregularly costate.

The calyx texture and inflorescence structure of Roseodendron distinguish it clearly from Handroanthus and Tabebuia. The fruit ridges are much more conspicuous than those of any species of Tabebuia.

== History ==
Roseodendron donnell-smithii was named by Joseph N. Rose in 1892 as a species of Tabebuia. The specific epithet honors Captain John Donnell Smith (1829–1928), a biologist and officer in the Confederate States Army.

Roseodendron chryseum was named by Sidney Fay Blake in 1918 as a species of Tabebuia. The specific epithet is derived from a Greek word meaning "gold colored".

Roseodendron donnell-smithii was transferred from Tabebuia to Cybistax by Russell J. Seibert in 1940. Seibert did likewise for R. chryseum soon afterward, in the same year.

The genus Roseodendron was described in 1965 by Faustino Miranda Gonzalez. It was named for Joseph Nelson Rose. Dendron is a Greek word meaning "tree". Miranda assigned to Roseodendron the same 2 species that it includes today.

Both of these species were transferred back to Tabebuia by Alwyn H. Gentry in 1992. In that year, Gentry published a taxonomic revision of Tabebuia in Flora Neotropica. He divided Tabebuia into 10 species groups, including all of the species now placed in Roseodendron and Handroanthus. His group 1 corresponds to Roseodendron.

In 2007, a phylogenetic analysis of DNA sequences resolved Roseodendron as one member of a tetratomy that is sister to Sparattosperma, the most basal clade in the Tabebuia alliance. A phylogenetic tree can be seen at Bignoniaceae. The Tabebuia alliance is an informally named monophyletic group that is not placed at any taxonomic rank. It consists of genera that had formerly been placed in the tribe Tecomeae.

On 25 November 2024, both members of the genus Roseodendron will be put on Appendix II of CITES, which means that international trade will be controlled for sustainability.
