= A. macrophylla =

A. macrophylla may refer to:

- Adelphia macrophylla, a plant species found in South America
- Alseuosmia macrophylla, a plant species endemic to New Zealand
- Amphitecna macrophylla, a plant species found in Central America
- Aristolochia macrophylla, a plant species native to North America
- Asystasia macrophylla, a plant species found in Africa
