= T. polymorpha =

T. polymorpha may refer to:

- Tabebuia polymorpha, a plant endemic to Cuba
- Tectaria polymorpha, a leptosporangiate fern
- Trichosarcina polymorpha, a green alga
