= Amphitecna molinae =

Conservation status
- Endangered (IUCN 3.1)

Scientific classification
- Kingdom: Plantae
- Clade: Tracheophytes
- Clade: Angiosperms
- Clade: Eudicots
- Clade: Asterids
- Order: Lamiales
- Family: Bignoniaceae
- Genus: Amphitecna
- Species: A. molinae

Binomial name
- Amphitecna molinae L.O.Williams

Synonyms
- Dendrosicus molinae (L.O.Williams) A.H.Gentry

Species of flowering plant

Amphitecna molinae is an endangered species of flowering plant in the family Bignoniaceae. It is a tree or shrub native to El Salvador, Honduras, and Nicaragua.
