= Pristimantis gentryi =

Conservation status
- Endangered (IUCN 3.1)

Scientific classification
- Kingdom: Animalia
- Phylum: Chordata
- Class: Amphibia
- Order: Anura
- Family: Strabomantidae
- Genus: Pristimantis
- Subgenus: Pristimantis
- Species: P. gentryi

Binomial name
- Pristimantis gentryi (Lynch and Duellman, 1997)

Synonyms
- Eleutherodactylus gentryi Lynch and Duellman, 1997

Species of amphibian

Pristimantis gentryi is a species of frogs in the family Strabomantidae. It is endemic to central Ecuador where it is found in a small area west of the Páramo de Apagua, Cotopaxi Province. The specific name gentryi honors Alwyn Gentry, American botanist who perished during his field work in Ecuador. Common name Pilalo robber frog has been proposed for this species.

== Description ==
Adult males measure 23–29 mm (0.9–1.1 in) and adult females 30–36 mm (1.2–1.4 in) in snout–vent length. The snout is short. Tympanic membrane is absent and tympanic annulus is usually absent. Fingers and toes have narrow lateral keels but no webbing; the digital discs are small but distinct. The dorsum is brown with little pattern, but a pale labial stripe is present. Dorsal skin is smooth to feebly warty; dorsolateral folds are usually distinct. The venter is cream with small brown flecks. The posterior surfaces of the thighs are brown.

== Habitat and conservation ==
Pristimantis gentryi inhabits high-altitude (2,850–3,380 m (9,350–11,090 ft) asl) cloud forests, presumably also high-altitude bush lands and grasslands. It is threatened by habitat loss caused by deforestation from agricultural development and human settlement.
