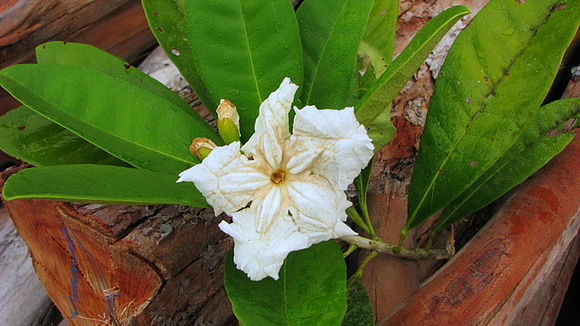

Scientific classification
- Kingdom: Plantae
- Clade: Tracheophytes
- Clade: Angiosperms
- Clade: Eudicots
- Clade: Asterids
- Order: Lamiales
- Family: Bignoniaceae
- Genus: Tabebuia
- Species: T. cassinoides

Binomial name
- Tabebuia cassinoides (Lam.) DC.

Synonyms
- List: Bignonia cassinoides Lam.; Bignonia obtusifolia Lam.; Bignonia tabebuya Vell.; Bignonia uliginosa Gomes; Catalpa cassinoides (Lam.) Spreng.; Proterpia obtusifolia (Lam.) Raf.; Spathodea magnolioides Cham.; Tabebuia magnolioides (Cham.) Miers; Tabebuia uliginosa (Gomes) DC.; Tabebuia uliginosa (Gomes) A. DC.; Tecoma uliginosa Mart. ex DC.

= Tabebuia cassinoides =

Species of tree

Tabebuia cassinoides (Portuguese common name caixeta) is a tree native to Central and South America. It is used as a timber tree to make pencils.
