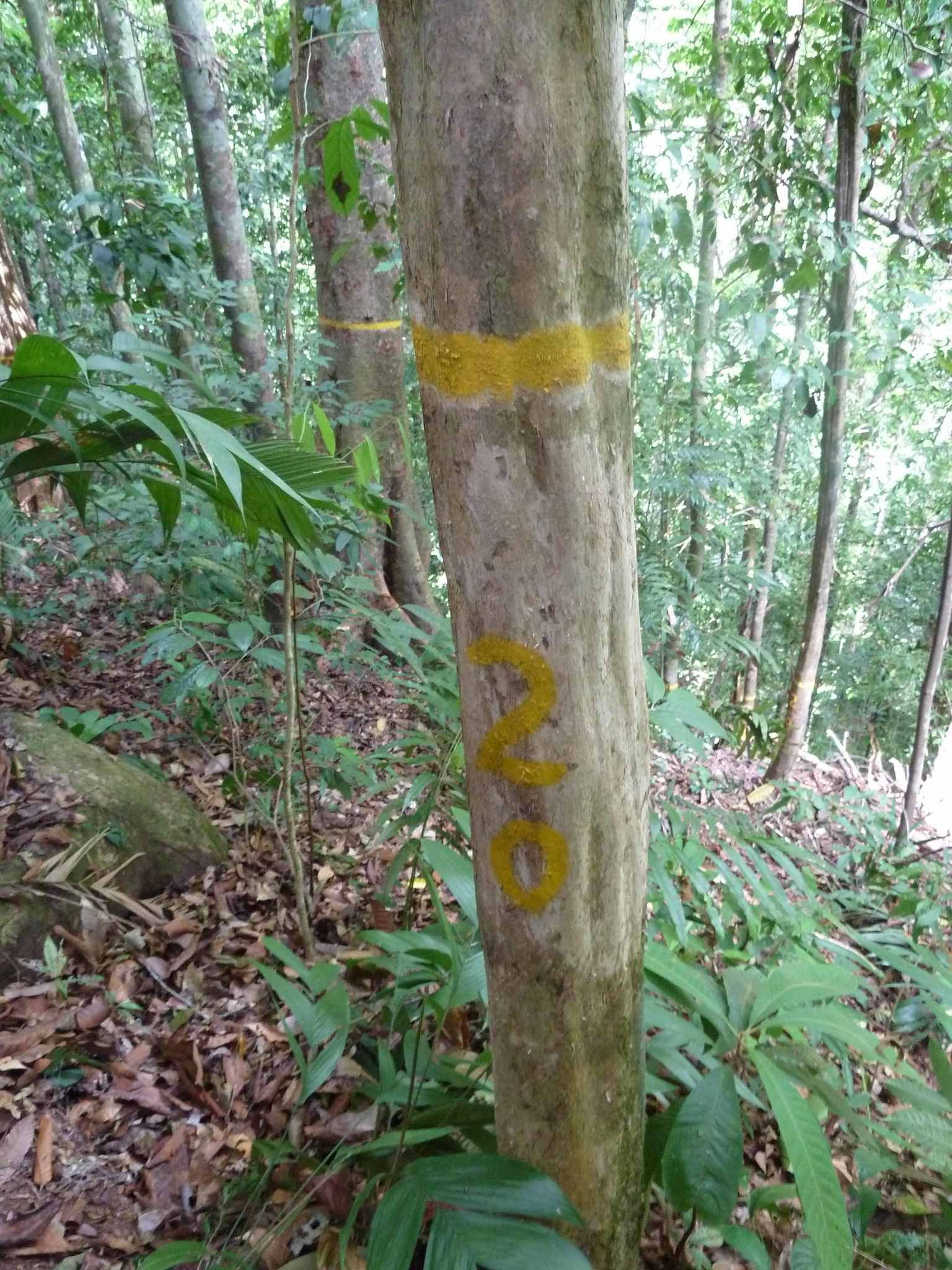

Conservation status
- Near Threatened (IUCN 3.1)

Scientific classification
- Kingdom: Plantae
- Clade: Tracheophytes
- Clade: Angiosperms
- Clade: Eudicots
- Clade: Asterids
- Order: Lamiales
- Family: Bignoniaceae
- Genus: Amphitecna
- Species: A. isthmica

Binomial name
- Amphitecna isthmica (A.Gentry) A.Gentry

= Amphitecna isthmica =

Species of flowering plant

Amphitecna isthmica is a species of plant in the family Bignoniaceae. It is found in Colombia, Costa Rica, and Panama. It is threatened by habitat loss.
