= Amphitecna sessilifolia =

Conservation status
- Vulnerable (IUCN 2.3)

Scientific classification
- Kingdom: Plantae
- Clade: Tracheophytes
- Clade: Angiosperms
- Clade: Eudicots
- Clade: Asterids
- Order: Lamiales
- Family: Bignoniaceae
- Genus: Amphitecna
- Species: A. sessilifolia

Binomial name
- Amphitecna sessilifolia (J.D.Sm.) L.O.Wms.

Species of flowering plant

Amphitecna sessilifolia is a species of plant in the family Bignoniaceae. It is found in Costa Rica and Panama. It is threatened by habitat loss.
