= Tabebuia platyantha =

Conservation status
- Near Threatened (IUCN 2.3)

Scientific classification
- Kingdom: Plantae
- Clade: Tracheophytes
- Clade: Angiosperms
- Clade: Eudicots
- Clade: Asterids
- Order: Lamiales
- Family: Bignoniaceae
- Genus: Tabebuia
- Species: T. platyantha

Binomial name
- Tabebuia platyantha (Griseb.) Britton

Synonyms
- Tabebuia jamaicensis Britton; Tecoma brittonii Urb.; Tecoma platyantha Griseb.; Tecoma brittonii var. decussata Urb.

Species of flowering plant

Tabebuia platyantha is a species of flowering plant in the family Bignoniaceae. It is endemic to Jamaica.
