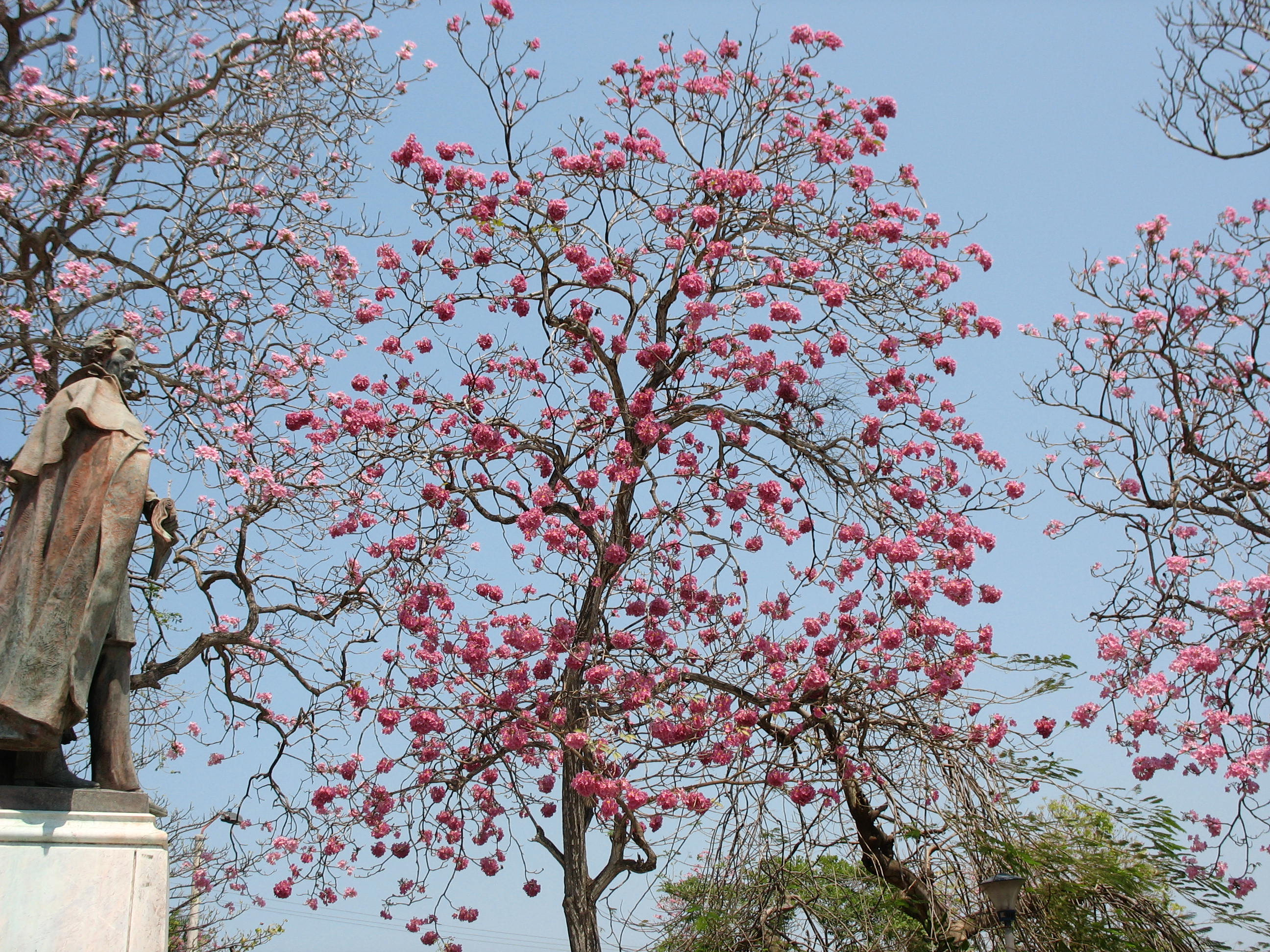

Scientific classification
- Kingdom: Plantae
- Clade: Tracheophytes
- Clade: Angiosperms
- Clade: Eudicots
- Clade: Asterids
- Order: Lamiales
- Family: Bignoniaceae
- Genus: Tabebuia
- Species: T. rosea

Binomial name
- Tabebuia rosea DC.

Synonyms
- List: Bignonia fluviatilis G.Mey. nom. illeg.; Couralia rosea (Bertol.) Donn.Sm.; Sparattosperma roseum (Bertol.) Miers; Tabebuia mexicana (Mart. ex DC.) Hemsl.; Tabebuia punctatissima (Kraenzl.) Standl.; Tecoma mexicana Mart. ex DC.; Tecoma punctatissima Kraenzl.; Tecoma rosea Bertol.

= Tabebuia rosea =

Species of tree

Tabebuia rosea, also called pink poui and rosy trumpet tree, is a neotropical tree that grows up to 30 m (98 ft) and can reach a diameter at breast height of up to 100 cm (3 ft). The Spanish name roble de sabana, meaning "savannah oak", is widely used in Costa Rica, probably because it often remains in heavily deforested areas and because of the resemblance of its wood to that of oak trees. It is the national tree of El Salvador, where it is called maquilíshuat.

Like others of its genus, T. rosea is a popular ornamental in tropical climates such as the nations of Southeast Asia, with its pink blossoms often being compared to those of the Japanese Sakura cherry blossoms. Over time, they have become a familiar and iconic seasonal sight in many Malaysian towns and cities. Because of their stunning pink blooms that resemble cherry blossoms, they are locally known as "Malaysia Sakura". Various parts of the plants also contain potentially beneficial phytochemicals for medical use.

== Distribution and habitat ==
This species is distributed from southern Mexico to Venezuela and Ecuador. It has been found growing from sea level to 1,200 m (3,900 ft), in temperatures ranging from 20 to 30 °C (68 to 86 °F) on average, with annual rainfall above 500 mm (20 in), and on soils with very variable pH.

This tree is often seen in Neotropical cities, where it is often planted in parks and gardens. In the rainy season it offers shade and, in the dry season, abundant flowers are present on the defoliated trees.

== Description ==
The tree is short, with irregular, stratified ramification and only a few, thick branches. The bark can be gray to brown, in varying darkness and may be vertically fissured. Leaves are compound, digitate and deciduous. Each leaf has five leaflets of variable size, the middle one being the largest. Flowering occurs mainly in January and February, and is generally associated with dry periods; although flowering has also been observed in August, September, April and May. Flowers are large, in various tones of pink to purple, and appear while the tree has few or no leaves. Pollination occurs probably by insects, although the flowers are visited by many birds such as tanagers, hummingbirds and orioles. The long and slender fruit capsules can measure up to 35 cm (14 in) and appear from February through April. After the drying fruit dehisces, the anemochorous, hyaline-membrane-winged seeds are released. There are an average of 45,000 seeds per kg with up to 13% water content. Germination of seeds is extremely easy and efficient, reaching almost 100%. It is a fairly fast growing tree.

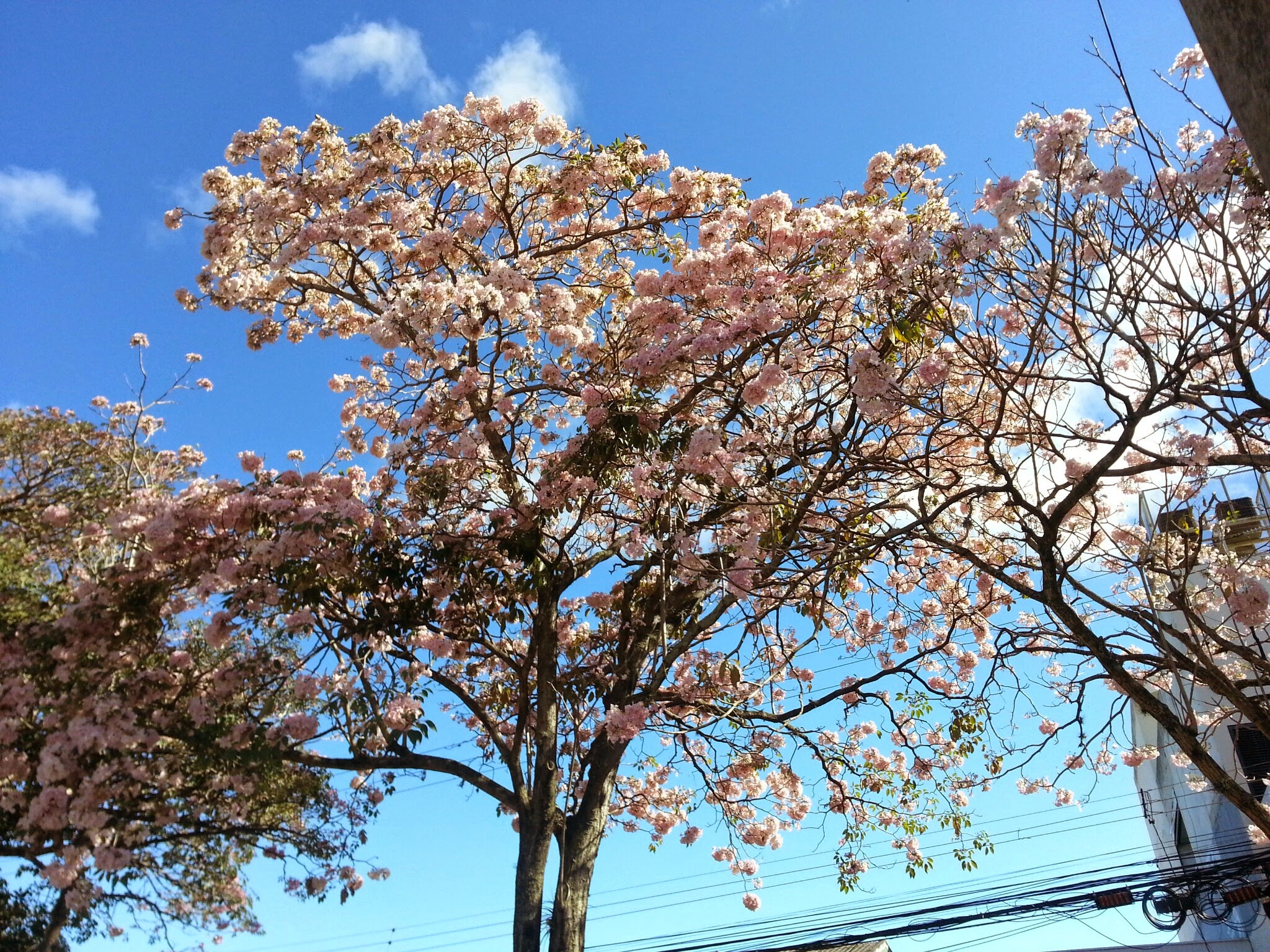
Tree in bloom

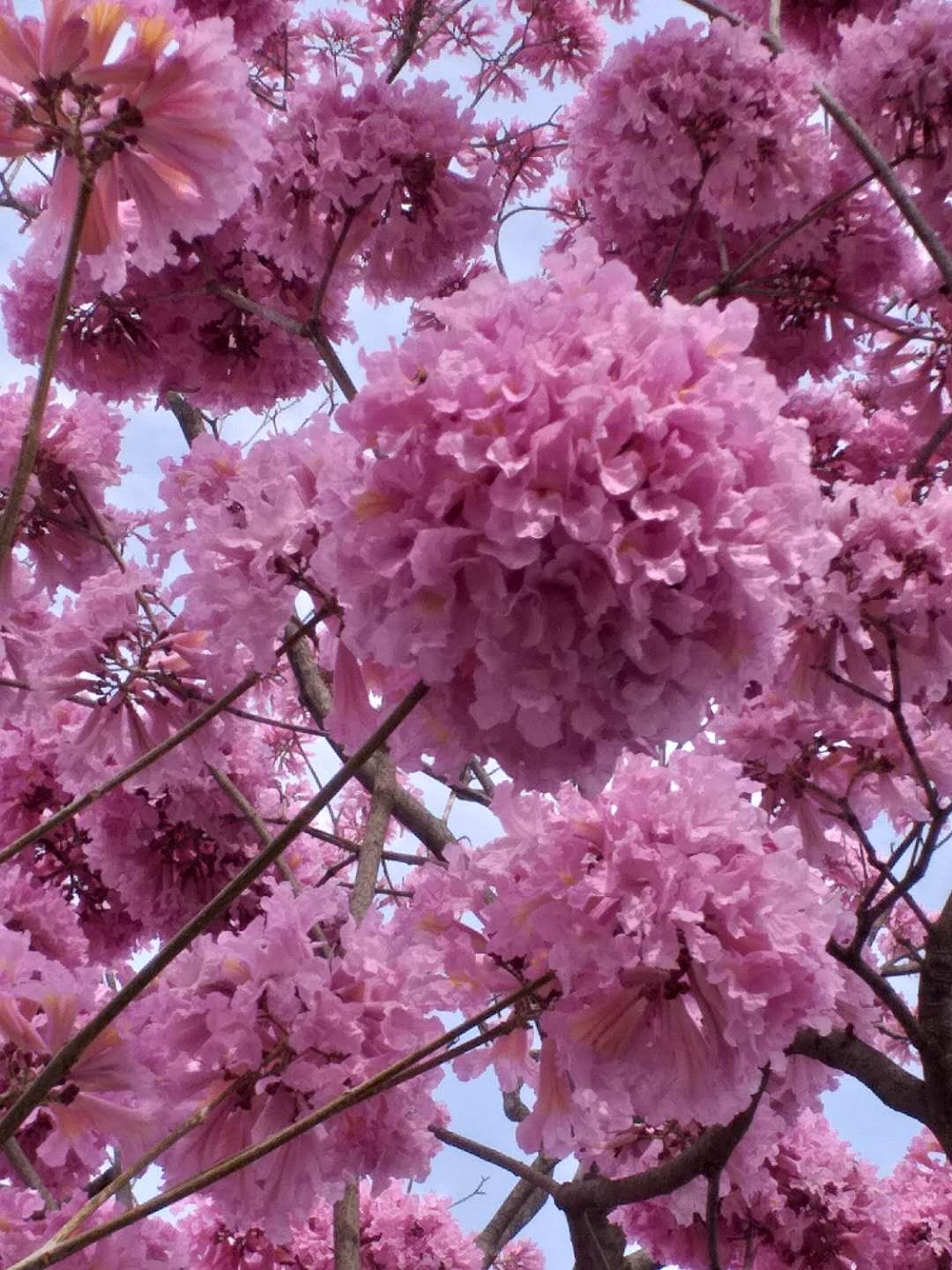
Inflorescence

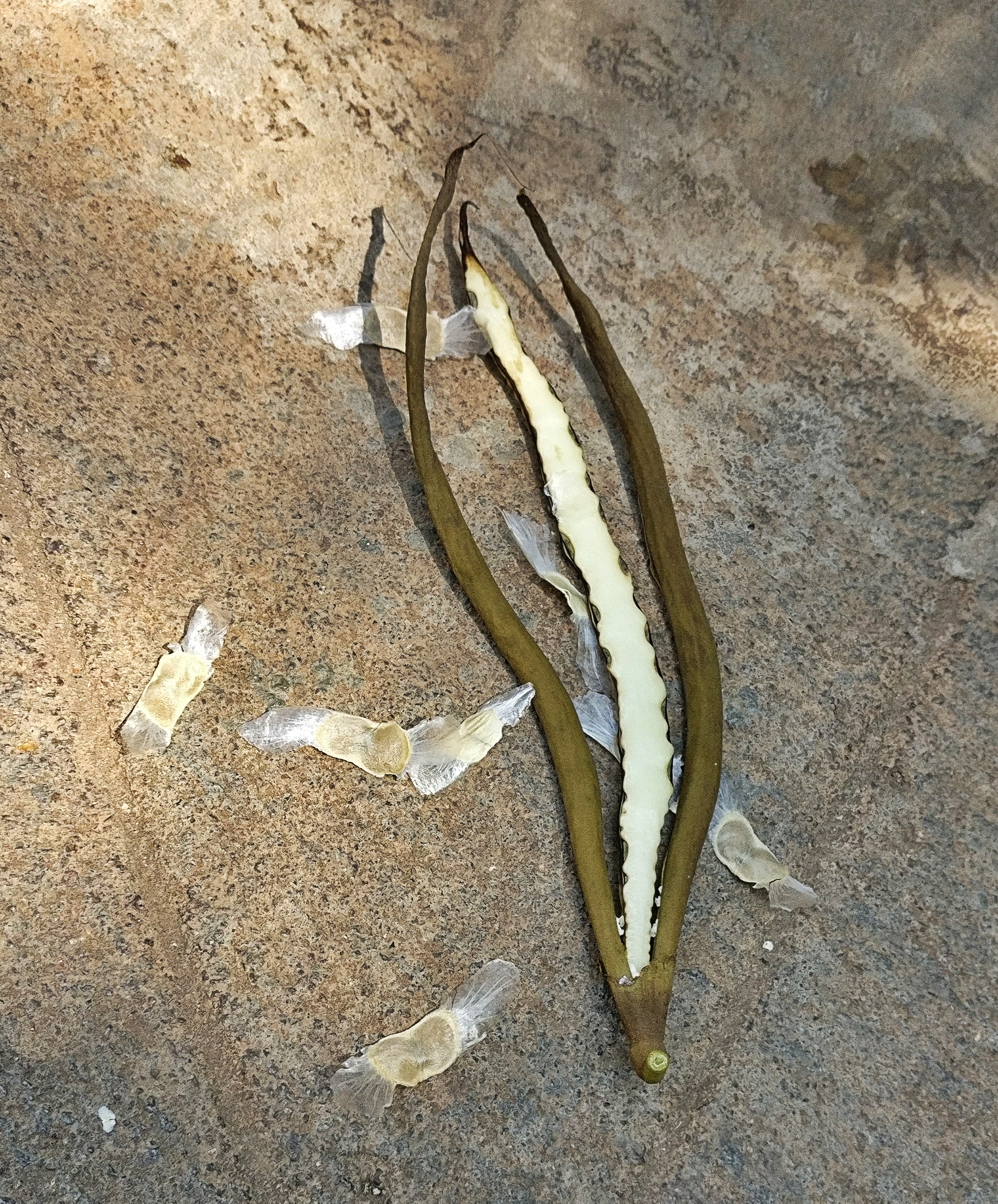
A pod and its winged seeds

== Medicinal uses ==
Preparations of the bark of the tree are consumed to eliminate intestinal parasites, malaria and uterine cancer. A decoction of the bark is recommended for anemia and constipation. A decoction of the flowers, leaves and roots has been used to reduce fevers and pain, cause sweating, to treat tonsil inflammation and various other disorders.

Among the various active phytochemicals in the tree is lapachol, a natural organic compound isolated from various other Tabebuia species. Chemically, it is a derivative of naphthoquinone, related to vitamin K.

Once studied as a possible treatment for some types of cancer, lapachol's potential is now considered low due to its toxic side effects. Lapachol also has antimalarial and antitrypanosomal effects.

Other active compounds include alkaloids, flavonoids, tannins, saponins, coumarins, triterpenoids, and phenolics.
