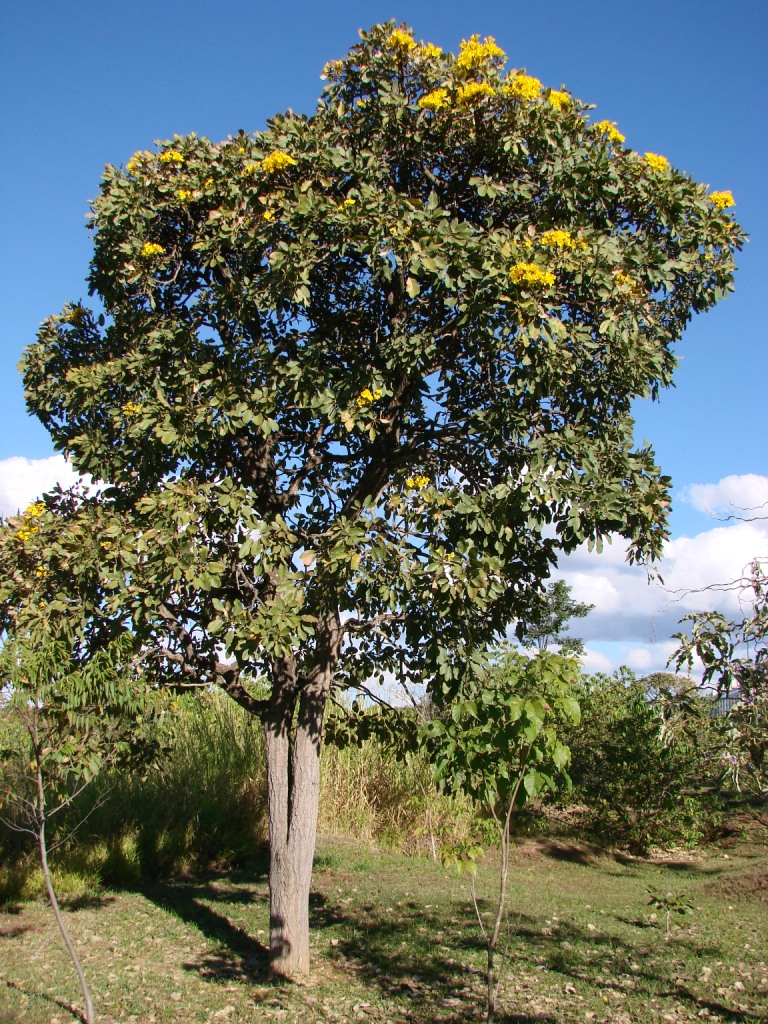

Conservation status
- Secure (NatureServe)

Scientific classification
- Kingdom: Plantae
- Clade: Tracheophytes
- Clade: Angiosperms
- Clade: Eudicots
- Clade: Asterids
- Order: Lamiales
- Family: Bignoniaceae
- Genus: Tabebuia
- Species: T. aurea

Binomial name
- Tabebuia aurea (Silva Manso) Benth. & Hook.f. ex S.Moore

Synonyms
- Bignonia aurea Silva Manso; Bignonia squamellulosa DC. nom. inval.; Couralia caraiba (Mart.) Corr.Méllo ex Stellfeld; Gelseminum caraiba (Mart.) Kuntze; Handroanthus caraiba (Mart.) Mattos; Handroanthus leucophloeus (Mart. ex DC.) Mattos; Tabebuia argentea (Bureau & K.Schum.) Britton; Tabebuia caraiba (Mart.) Bureau; Tabebuia suberosa Rusby; Tecoma argentea Bureau & K.Schum.; Tecoma aurea (Silva Manso) DC.; Tecoma caraiba Mart.; Tecoma leucophlaeos Mart. ex DC.; Tecoma squamellulosa DC.; Tecoma trichocalycina DC.

= Tabebuia aurea =

Species of tree

Tabebuia aurea is a species of Tabebuia native to South America in Suriname, Brazil, eastern Bolivia, Peru, Paraguay, and northern Argentina. The common English name Caribbean trumpet tree is misleading, as it is not native to the Caribbean. It is also known as the silver trumpet tree, and tree of gold.

== Description ==
It is a small dry season-deciduous tree growing to 8 m tall. The leaves are palmately compound, with five or seven leaflets, each leaflet 6–18 cm long, green with silvery scales both above and below.

The flowers are bright yellow, up to 6.5 cm diameter, produced several together in a loose panicle. The fruit is a slender 10 cm long capsule.

Cultivation

It is a popular ornamental tree in subtropical and tropical regions, grown for its spectacular flower display on leafless shoots at the end of the dry season.

== Ecology ==
This species’ presence in riparian areas of the Caatinga of northeastern Brazil is a crucial resource for Spix's macaw (Cyanopsitta spixii), which is extinct in the wild with fewer than 100 birds remaining in captivity. Any future reintroduction would have to provide sufficient T. aurea for nesting and other purposes - while the tree is not considered threatened on a global scale, locally it has declined due to unsustainable use for timber and some other factors.
