= Amphitecna spathicalyx =

Conservation status
- Critically Endangered (IUCN 2.3)

Scientific classification
- Kingdom: Plantae
- Clade: Tracheophytes
- Clade: Angiosperms
- Clade: Eudicots
- Clade: Asterids
- Order: Lamiales
- Family: Bignoniaceae
- Genus: Amphitecna
- Species: A. spathicalyx

Binomial name
- Amphitecna spathicalyx (A.Gentry) A.Gentry

Synonyms
- Dendrosicus spathicalyx A.H.Gentry

Species of flowering plant

Amphitecna spathicalyx is a species of plant in the family Bignoniaceae. It is endemic to Panama.
