= Tabebuia myrtifolia =

Conservation status
- Vulnerable (IUCN 2.3)

Scientific classification
- Kingdom: Plantae
- Clade: Tracheophytes
- Clade: Angiosperms
- Clade: Eudicots
- Clade: Asterids
- Order: Lamiales
- Family: Bignoniaceae
- Genus: Tabebuia
- Species: T. myrtifolia

Binomial name
- Tabebuia myrtifolia (Griseb.) Britton

Synonyms
- Tecoma myrtifolia Griseb.; Tabebuia anafensis Urb.; Tabebuia anafensis subsp. munizii Borhidi; Tabebuia mogotensis Urb.; Tabebuia myrtifolia var. petrophila (Greenm.) A.H.Gentry; Tabebuia petrophila Greenm.; Tabebuia saxicola Britton; Tabebuia subsessilis Urb.; Tabebuia truncata var. sphenophylla Urb.

Species of flowering plant

Tabebuia myrtifolia is a species of flowering plant in the family Bignoniaceae. It is a tree native to Cuba and Hispaniola (Haiti and Beata Island in the Dominican Republic). It is threatened by habitat loss. The IUCN assesses the species as vulnerable under the synonym Tabebuia anafensis.
