= Tabebuia lapacho =

Conservation status
- Vulnerable (IUCN 2.3)

Scientific classification
- Kingdom: Plantae
- Clade: Tracheophytes
- Clade: Angiosperms
- Clade: Eudicots
- Clade: Asterids
- Order: Lamiales
- Family: Bignoniaceae
- Genus: Tabebuia
- Species: T. lapacho

Binomial name
- Tabebuia lapacho (K. Schumann) Sandwith

Species of flowering plant

Tabebuia lapacho is a species of plant in the family Bignoniaceae. It is found in Argentina and Bolivia. It is threatened by habitat loss.
