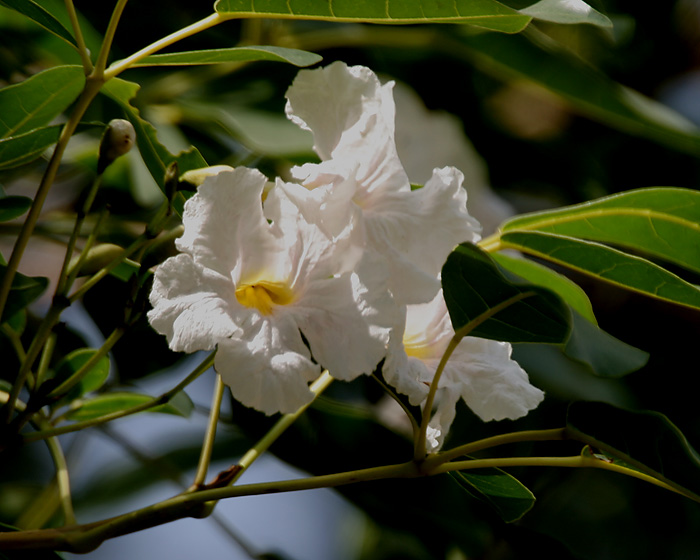

Conservation status
- Least Concern (IUCN 3.1)

Scientific classification
- Kingdom: Plantae
- Clade: Tracheophytes
- Clade: Angiosperms
- Clade: Eudicots
- Clade: Asterids
- Order: Lamiales
- Family: Bignoniaceae
- Genus: Tabebuia
- Species: T. pallida

Binomial name
- Tabebuia pallida (Lindl.) Miers 1863

= Tabebuia pallida =

Species of tree

Tabebuia pallida is a species of Tabebuia native to the Caribbean (Leeward Islands, Windward Islands and Puerto Rico).
