= Spirotecoma holguinensis =

Conservation status
- Endangered (IUCN 2.3)

Scientific classification
- Kingdom: Plantae
- Clade: Tracheophytes
- Clade: Angiosperms
- Clade: Eudicots
- Clade: Asterids
- Order: Lamiales
- Family: Bignoniaceae
- Genus: Spirotecoma
- Species: S. holguinensis

Binomial name
- Spirotecoma holguinensis (Britton) Alain

Species of flowering plant

Spirotecoma holguinensis is a species of plant in the family Bignoniaceae. It is endemic to Cuba. It is threatened by habitat loss.
