= Tabebuia bibracteolata =

Conservation status
- Vulnerable (IUCN 2.3)

Scientific classification
- Kingdom: Plantae
- Clade: Tracheophytes
- Clade: Angiosperms
- Clade: Eudicots
- Clade: Asterids
- Order: Lamiales
- Family: Bignoniaceae
- Genus: Tabebuia
- Species: T. bibracteolata

Binomial name
- Tabebuia bibracteolata (Griseb.) Britton

Synonyms
- Tabebuia candicans Borhidi & O.Muñiz; Tabebuia furfuracea Urb.; Tabebuia nervosa Urb.; Tabebuia nipensis Urb.; Tabebuia subcordata Urb.; Tecoma bibracteolata Griseb.

Species of flowering plant

Tabebuia bibracteolata is a species of flowering plant in the family Bignoniaceae. It is endemic to Cuba.
