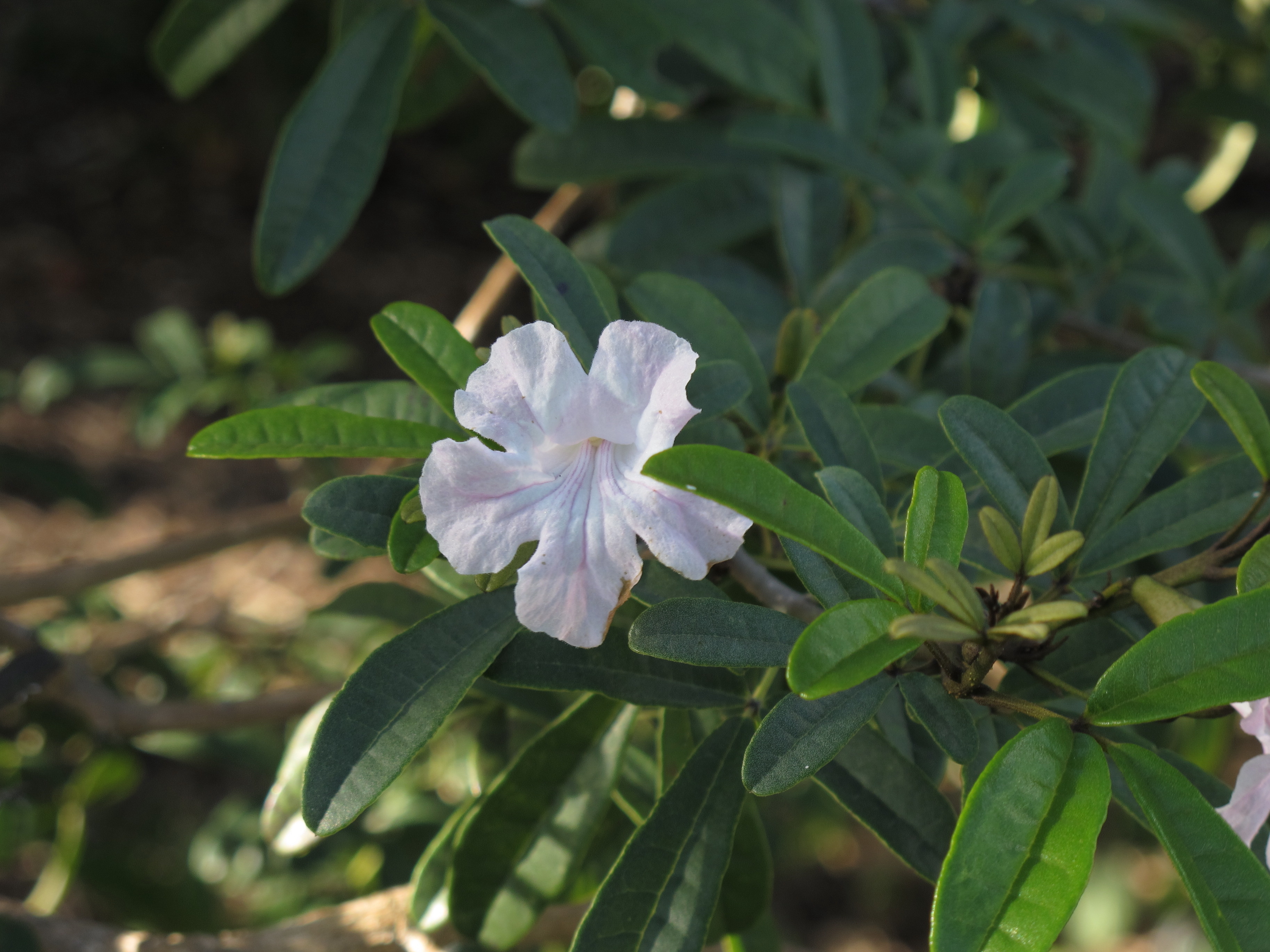

Scientific classification
- Kingdom: Plantae
- Clade: Tracheophytes
- Clade: Angiosperms
- Clade: Eudicots
- Clade: Asterids
- Order: Lamiales
- Family: Bignoniaceae
- Genus: Tabebuia
- Species: T. maxonii

Binomial name
- Tabebuia maxonii Urb.

Synonyms
- Tabebuia samanensis Urb.

= Tabebuia maxonii =

Species of flowering plant

Tabebuia maxonii is a species of Tabebuia native to the Dominican Republic.

It is named for the botanist William Ralph Maxon.
