= Tabebuia shaferi =

Conservation status
- Vulnerable (IUCN 2.3)

Scientific classification
- Kingdom: Plantae
- Clade: Tracheophytes
- Clade: Angiosperms
- Clade: Eudicots
- Clade: Asterids
- Order: Lamiales
- Family: Bignoniaceae
- Genus: Tabebuia
- Species: T. shaferi

Binomial name
- Tabebuia shaferi Britton

Synonyms
- Tabebuia maestrensis Urb.; Tabebuia oligolepis Urb.

Species of flowering plant

Tabebuia shaferi is a species of plant in the family Bignoniaceae. It is endemic to Cuba. It is threatened by habitat loss.
