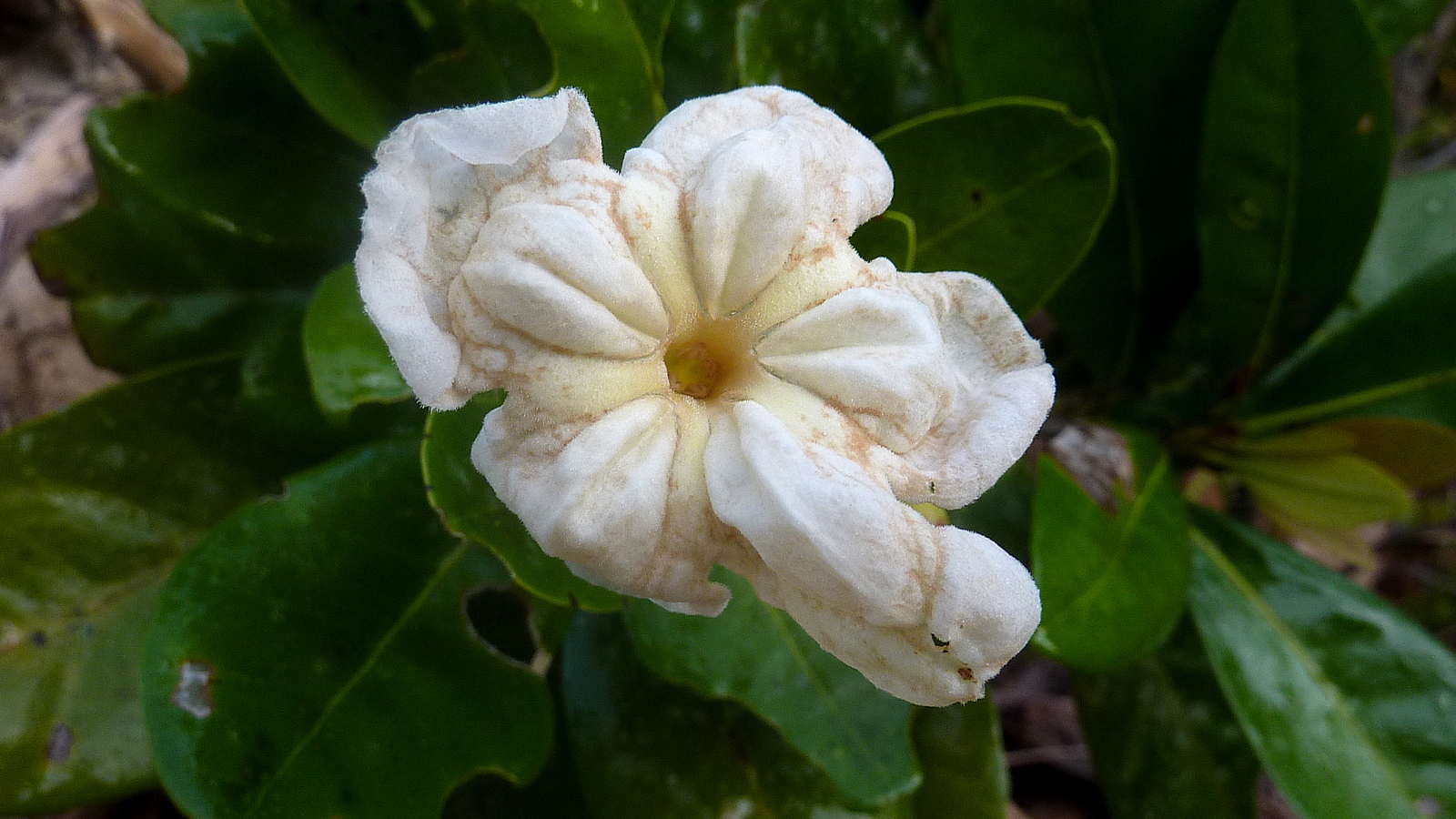

Scientific classification
- Kingdom: Plantae
- Clade: Tracheophytes
- Clade: Angiosperms
- Clade: Eudicots
- Clade: Asterids
- Order: Lamiales
- Family: Bignoniaceae
- Genus: Tabebuia
- Species: T. stenocalyx

Binomial name
- Tabebuia stenocalyx Sprague & Stapf 1910

= Tabebuia stenocalyx =

Species of tree

Tabebuia stenocalyx is a species of Tabebuia native to Trinidad.
