= Crossothamnus =

Scientific classification
- Kingdom: Plantae
- Clade: Embryophytes
- Clade: Tracheophytes
- Clade: Spermatophytes
- Clade: Angiosperms
- Clade: Eudicots
- Clade: Asterids
- Order: Asterales
- Family: Asteraceae
- Subfamily: Asteroideae
- Tribe: Eupatorieae
- Genus: Crossothamnus; R.M.King & H.Rob.

Genus of flowering plants

Crossothamnus is a genus of South American flowering plants in the family Asteraceae.

Species

- Crossothamnus gentryi R.M.King & H.Rob. - Peru, Ecuador
- Crossothamnus killipii (R.M.King & H.Rob.) R.M.King & H.Rob. - Colombia
- Crossothamnus pascoanus M.O.Dillon & B.L.Turner - Peru
- Crossothamnus weberbaueri (Hieron.) R.M.King & H.Rob. - Peru
