= Tabebuia elongata =

Conservation status
- Critically Endangered (IUCN 3.1)

Scientific classification
- Kingdom: Plantae
- Clade: Tracheophytes
- Clade: Angiosperms
- Clade: Eudicots
- Clade: Asterids
- Order: Lamiales
- Family: Bignoniaceae
- Genus: Tabebuia
- Species: T. elongata

Binomial name
- Tabebuia elongata Urb.

Species of flowering plant

Tabebuia elongata is a species of flowering plant in the family Bignoniaceae. It is a tree endemic to Cuba.
