= Tabebuia arimaoensis =

Conservation status
- Vulnerable (IUCN 2.3)

Scientific classification
- Kingdom: Plantae
- Clade: Tracheophytes
- Clade: Angiosperms
- Clade: Eudicots
- Clade: Asterids
- Order: Lamiales
- Family: Bignoniaceae
- Genus: Tabebuia
- Species: T. arimaoensis

Binomial name
- Tabebuia arimaoensis Britton

Species of flowering plant

Tabebuia arimaoensis is a species of plant in the family Bignoniaceae. It is endemic to Cuba.
