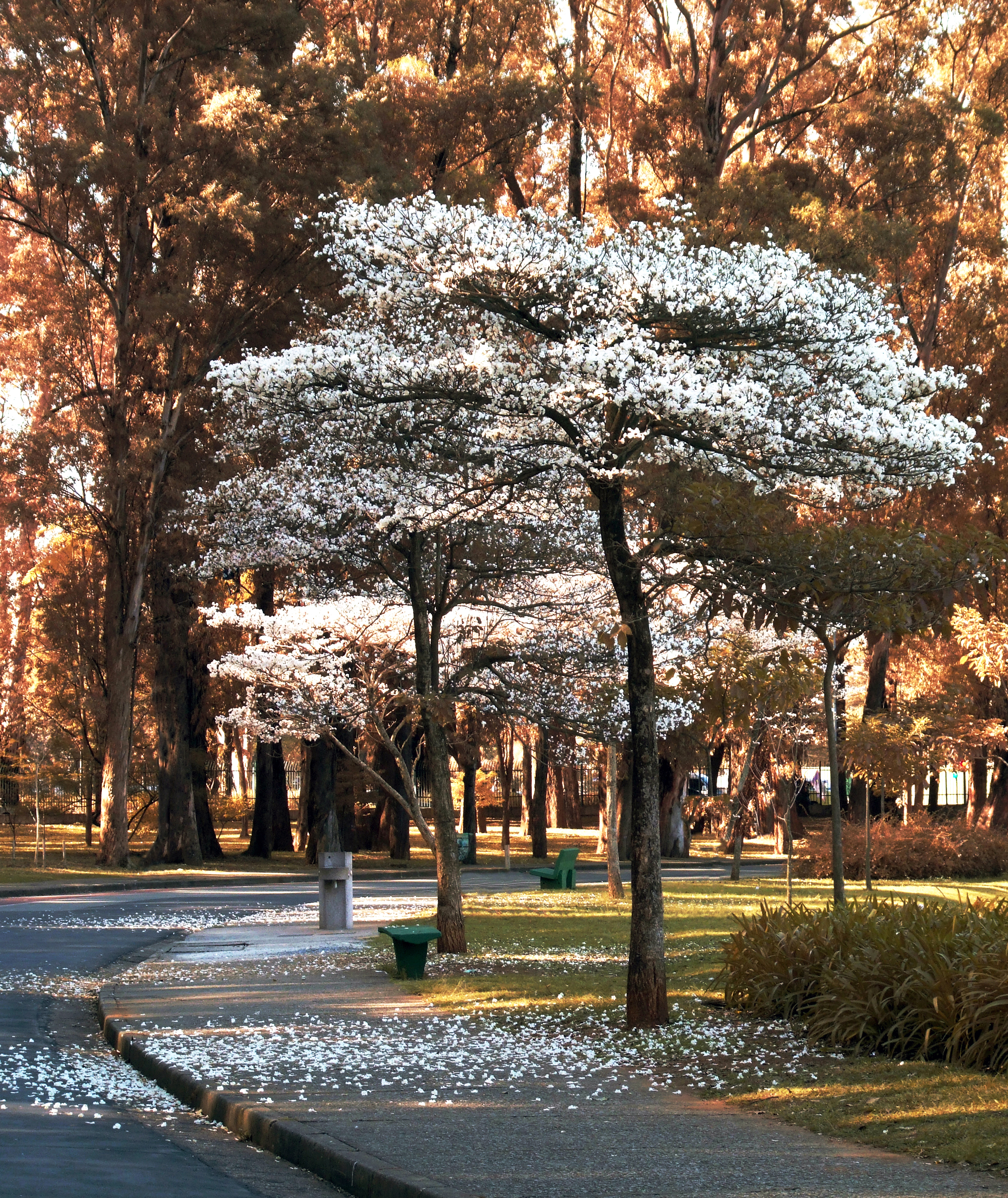

Scientific classification
- Kingdom: Plantae
- Clade: Embryophytes
- Clade: Tracheophytes
- Clade: Spermatophytes
- Clade: Angiosperms
- Clade: Eudicots
- Clade: Asterids
- Order: Lamiales
- Family: Bignoniaceae
- Genus: Tabebuia
- Species: T. roseo-alba

Binomial name
- Tabebuia roseo-alba (Ridl.) Sandwith

Synonyms
- List: Bignonia roseoalba Ridl.; Handroanthus odontodiscus (Bureau & K.Schum.) Mattos; Handroanthus piutinga (Pilg.) Mattos; Handroanthus roseoalbus (Ridl.) Mattos; Sparattosperma neurocalyx Bureau & K.Schum.; Tabebuia odontodiscus (Bureau & K.Schum.) Toledo; Tabebuia papyrophloios (Bureau & K.Schum.) Melch.; Tabebuia piutinga (Pilg.) Sandwith; Tecoma mattogrossensis Kraenzl.; Tecoma odontodiscus Bureau & K.Schum.; Tecoma papyrophloios Bureau & K.Schum.; Tecoma piutinga Pilg.; Tecoma schumanni Kraenzl.

= Tabebuia roseo-alba =

Species of tree

Tabebuia roseo-alba, known as white ipê, ipê-branco or lapacho blanco, is a tree native to Cerrado and Pantanal vegetation in Brazil, but also appears in Argentina (especially in the "Esteros del Ibera" wetlands) and more rarely in Paraguay.

This plant is frequently used as an ornamental plant and honey plant in Brazil and Argentina. On the other hand, its flowers seem to be less popular with many hummingbirds than those of other Tabebuia, being visited mostly by the occasional generalist species like the gilded sapphire (Hylocharis chrysura).
