= Tabebuia karsoana =

Conservation status
- Vulnerable (IUCN 3.1)

Scientific classification
- Kingdom: Plantae
- Clade: Tracheophytes
- Clade: Angiosperms
- Clade: Eudicots
- Clade: Asterids
- Order: Lamiales
- Family: Bignoniaceae
- Genus: Tabebuia
- Species: T. karsoana

Binomial name
- Tabebuia karsoana Trejo

Species of tree

Tabebuia karsoana is a tree species in the family Bignoniaceae endemic to the karst region of northern Puerto Rico.
