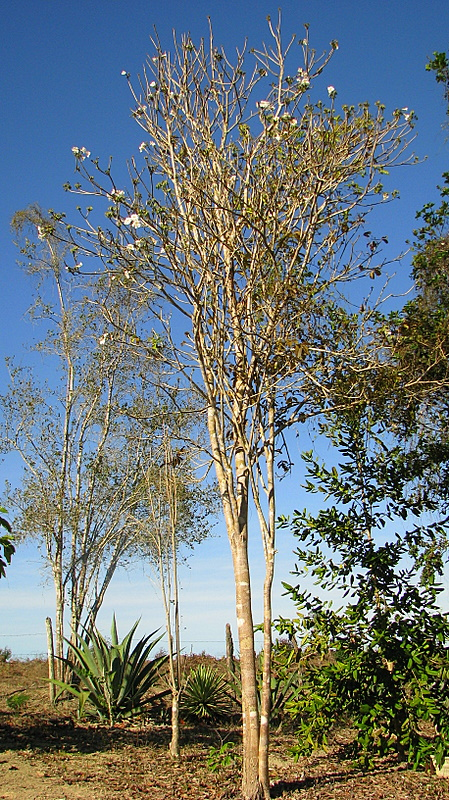

Scientific classification
- Kingdom: Plantae
- Clade: Embryophytes
- Clade: Tracheophytes
- Clade: Spermatophytes
- Clade: Angiosperms
- Clade: Eudicots
- Clade: Asterids
- Order: Lamiales
- Family: Bignoniaceae
- Genus: Tabebuia
- Species: T. elliptica

Binomial name
- Tabebuia elliptica (DC.) Sandwith

Synonyms
- Bignonia atrovirens DC. nom. illeg.; Bignonia elliptica Cham. nom. illeg.; Sparattosperma ellipticum (DC.) Bureau & K.Schum.; Sparattosperma psammophilum Mart. ex DC.; Tabebuia atrovirens (DC.) Standl.; Tecoma atrovirens DC.; Tecoma elliptica DC.

= Tabebuia elliptica =

Species of flowering plant

Tabebuia elliptica is a species of Tabebuia tree native to Brazil and Bolivia.

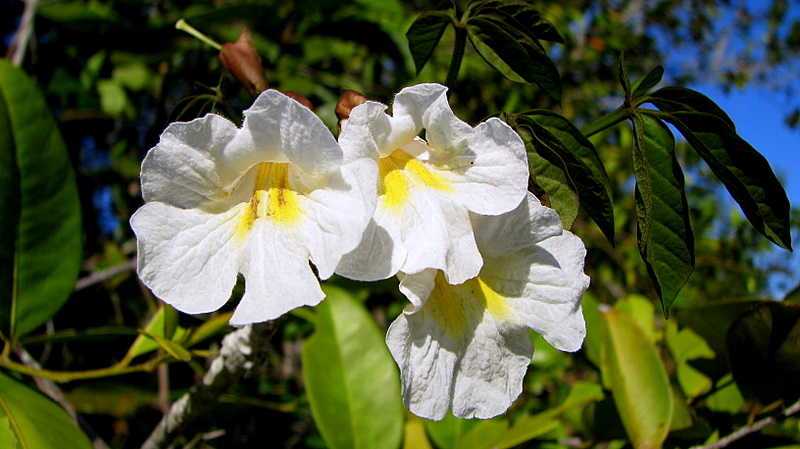
Flowers
