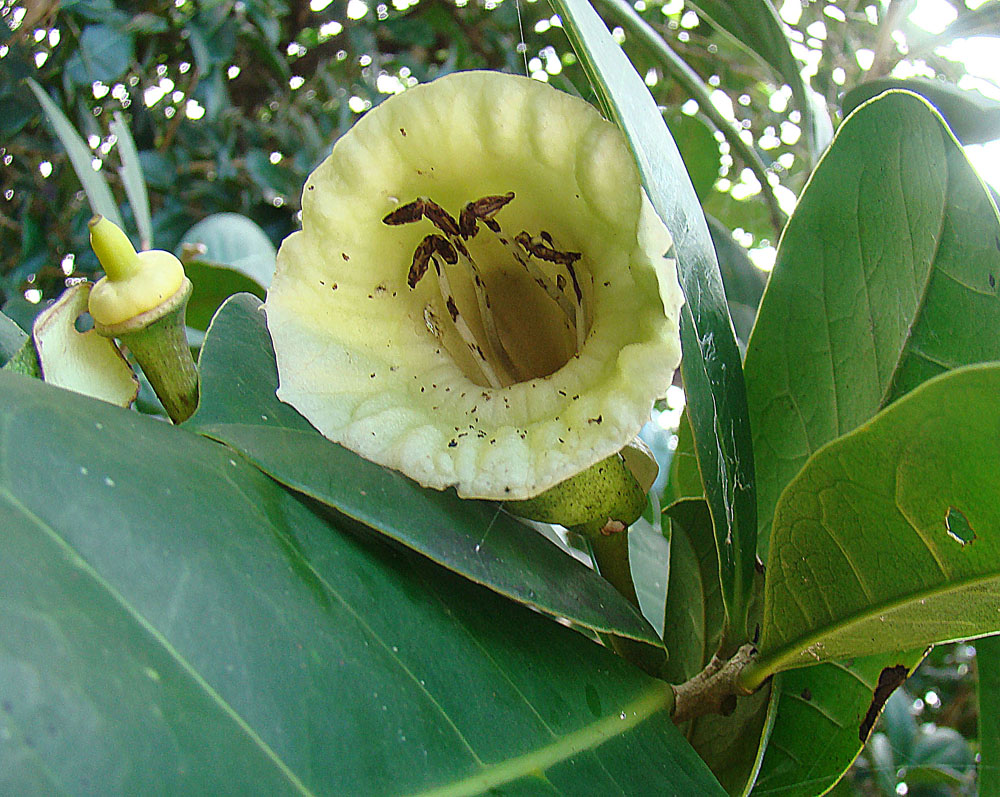

Scientific classification
- Kingdom: Plantae
- Clade: Tracheophytes
- Clade: Angiosperms
- Clade: Eudicots
- Clade: Asterids
- Order: Lamiales
- Family: Bignoniaceae
- Genus: Amphitecna
- Species: A. latifolia

Binomial name
- Amphitecna latifolia (Mill.) A.H.Gentry 1976

= Amphitecna latifolia =

Species of flowering plant

Amphitecna latifolia is a species of plant in the family Bignoniaceae from Belize and Costa Rica.
