= Spirotecoma apiculata =

Conservation status
- Vulnerable (IUCN 2.3)

Scientific classification
- Kingdom: Plantae
- Clade: Tracheophytes
- Clade: Angiosperms
- Clade: Eudicots
- Clade: Asterids
- Order: Lamiales
- Family: Bignoniaceae
- Genus: Spirotecoma
- Species: S. apiculata

Binomial name
- Spirotecoma apiculata (Britton) Alain

Species of flowering plant

Spirotecoma apiculata is a species of plant in the family Bignoniaceae. It is endemic to Cuba. It is threatened by habitat loss.
