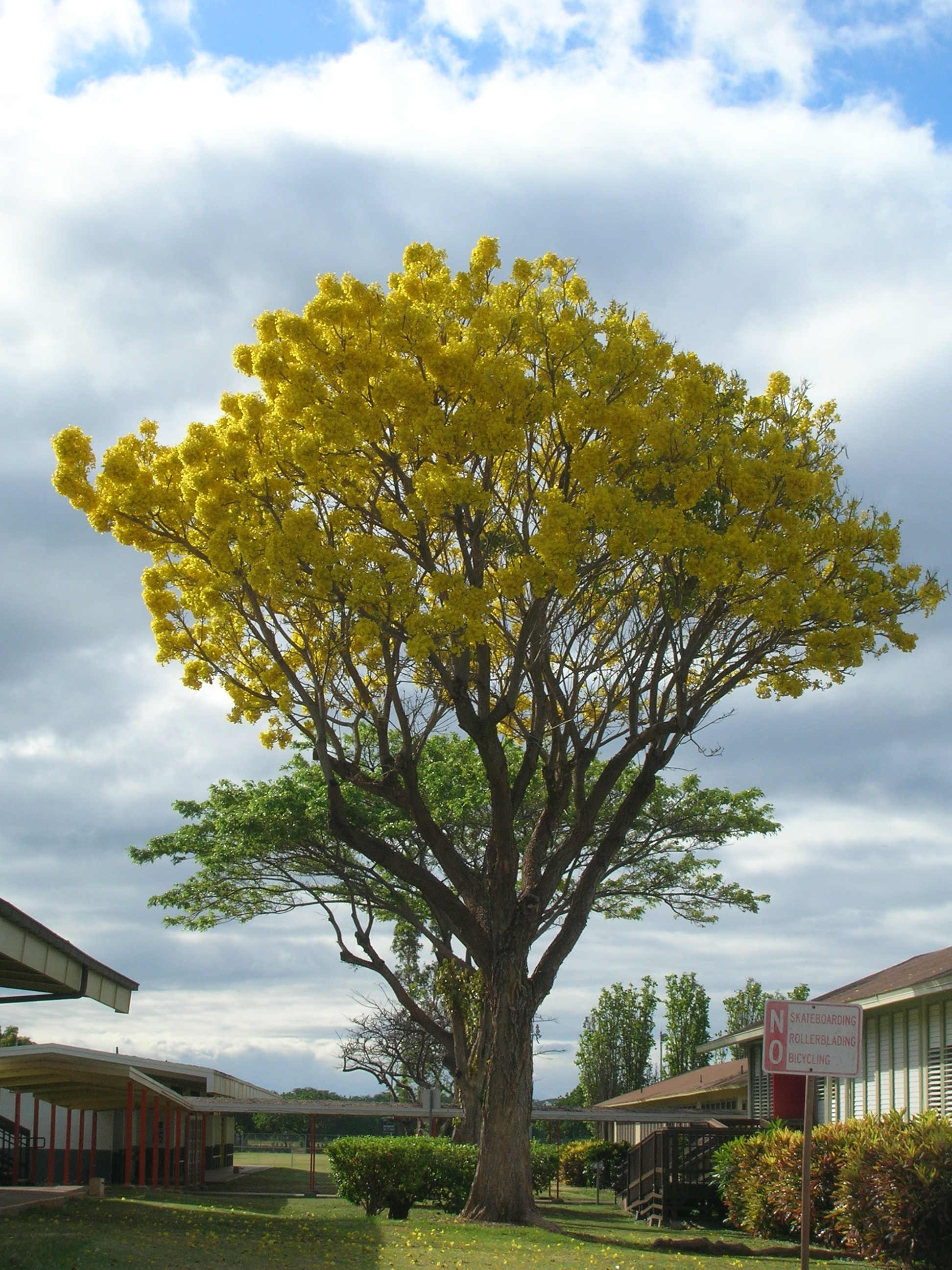

Conservation status
- Least Concern (IUCN 3.1)

Scientific classification
- Kingdom: Plantae
- Clade: Tracheophytes
- Clade: Angiosperms
- Clade: Eudicots
- Clade: Asterids
- Order: Lamiales
- Family: Bignoniaceae
- Genus: Roseodendron
- Species: R. donnell-smithii

Binomial name
- Roseodendron donnell-smithii (Rose) Miranda

= Roseodendron donnell-smithii =

Species of flowering plants

Roseodendron donnell-smithii (common name Primavera or Gold Tree) is a species of deciduous tree or large shrub in the genus Roseodendron in the Trumpet Vine Family (Bignoniaceae). It is native to Central America and Mexico. It can grow up to 25 m (82 ft) tall. It can be grown as an ornamental plant. A curiosity of this tree is that, according to Kuck and Tongg, the juvenile plants have palmate leaves while the mature trees have pinnate leaves. An abundance of yellow flowers appears during the leafless season.
