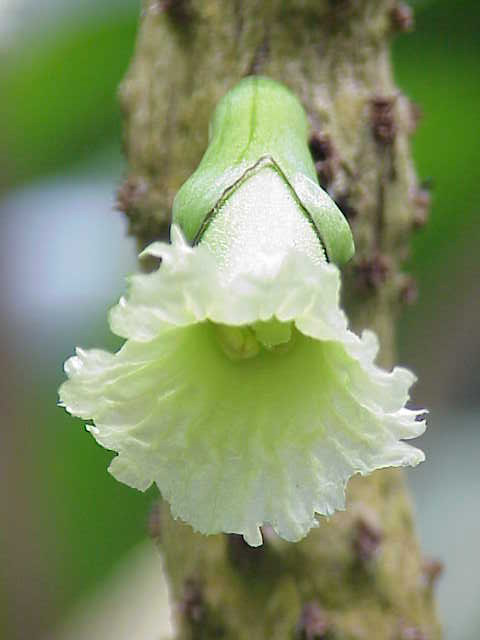

Scientific classification
- Kingdom: Plantae
- Clade: Embryophytes
- Clade: Tracheophytes
- Clade: Spermatophytes
- Clade: Angiosperms
- Clade: Eudicots
- Clade: Asterids
- Order: Lamiales
- Family: Bignoniaceae
- Genus: Amphitecna
- Species: A. macrophylla

Binomial name
- Amphitecna macrophylla (Seem.) Miers ex Baill.

Synonyms
- Amphitecna megalophylla (Donn.Sm.) A.H.Gentry; Amphitecna nigripes (Linden) Baill.; Crescentia macrophylla Seem.; Crescentia nigripes Linden; Crescentia regia Seem. nom. inval.; Dendrosicus macrophyllus (Seem.) A.H.Gentry; Enallagma macrophylla (Seem.) Lundell; Neotuerckheimia megalophylla Donn.Sm.

= Amphitecna macrophylla =

Species of flowering plant

Amphitecna macrophylla, commonly known as black calabash or chaff-bush, is a species of plant in the family Bignoniaceae. It is found in small patches of Mexico and Guatemala. It can reach a height of 15 to 30 feet (4.6 to 9.1 m). It is drought tolerant and is hardy to USDA Hardiness Zone 10b.
