= Alwyn Gentry =

American botanist (1945–1993)

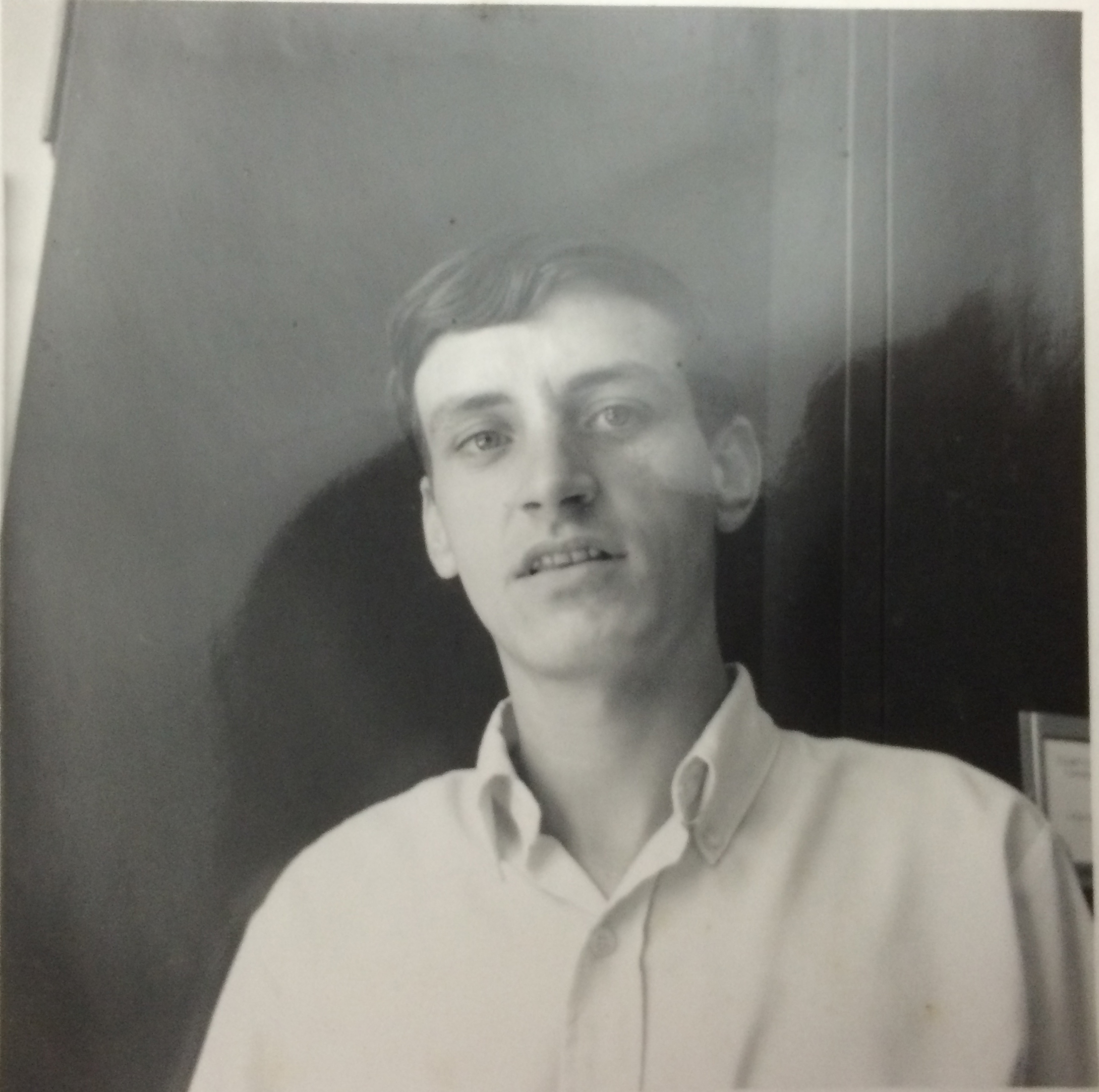
- Alwyn Gentry in August 1968.
- Born: January 6, 1945; Clay Center, Kansas
- Died: August 3, 1993 (aged 48)
- Citizenship: United States
- Education: Kansas State University (BA, BS); University of Wisconsin–Madison (MS); Washington University in St. Louis (Ph.D.)
- Known for: Flora of tropical forests; Gentry Forest Transect
- Scientific career
- Fields: Botany
- Thesis: An Eco-evolutionary Study of the Bignoniaceae of South Central America (1972)
- Author abbrev. (botany): A.H.Gentry

Alwyn Howard Gentry (January 6, 1945 – August 3, 1993) was an American botanist and plant collector, who made major contributions to the understanding of the vegetation of tropical forests.

== Education ==
Gentry was born on January 6, 1945, in Clay Center, Kansas, and received his schooling at the Clay Center Community High School, from which he graduated in 1963. He graduated from Kansas State University in 1967 with a B.A. in physical science and a B.S. in botany and zoology. He earned his master's degree in 1969 at the University of Wisconsin–Madison as a student of botanist Hugh Iltis, with a thesis on the genus Tabebuia (Bignoniaceae) of Central America, a subject which he continued to study at Washington University in St. Louis, Missouri, from which he received his doctorate in 1972, with a Ph.D. thesis entitled An Eco-evolutionary Study of the Bignoniaceae of South Central America.

== Career ==
Gentry spent his entire working career at the Missouri Botanical Garden, starting as an assistant curator in October 1972. In 1974, he made his first visit to Peru, a country that became the major focus of much of his subsequent work; he made his second trip there in 1976 and by the time of his death had visited the country 33 times. He also maintained his interest in the Bignoniaceae and was seen as a specialist on the subject: he contributed treatments of the family to nine volumes, including the Flora of Panama, and had a further five in press when he died.

One of Gentry's major innovations was the use of transect samples as a tool for assessing the composition and structure of tropical forests, known as the Gentry Forest Transect. His method, allied to his encyclopedic knowledge of tropical plants, allowed him to sample a site in a matter of days, and over the course of his career he amassed data from over 200 such transects worldwide.

Because many of the plants which he encountered during his transect sampling were not flowering, Gentry developed the ability to identify species from vegetative specimens, not just from flowers and fruits. This ability that led to the publication of his Field Guide to the Families and Genera of Woody Plants of Northwest South America, completed just months before his death. By this time he was the senior curator at the Missouri Botanical Garden.

In 1990, Conservation International established a "Rapid Assessment Program" (RAP) to undertake quick assessments of areas deemed to be significant for conservation.

Gentry's transect method was well suited to such work and he became increasingly involved as a member of the RAP team.

== Personal life ==
Gentry was married with three children.

== Death ==
On August 3, 1993, Gentry was on a Rapid Assessment Program mission in western Ecuador, when the light aircraft in which he was traveling crashed into a mountain ridge near Guayaquil. Four people—the pilot, Gentry, American ornithologist Theodore A. Parker III, and Ecuadorian ecologist Eduardo Aspiazu—died in the crash; three other researchers survived.

== Legacy ==
Gentry was prolific both as an author and as a plant collector: he published over 200 works and had many more on hand at the time of his death and he collected over 70,000 plant specimens, hundreds of which have proved to be species new to science.

Gentry and Parker are memorialized in the annual Parker/Gentry Award for Conservation Biology of the Field Museum of Natural History.

Several plant species have been named after Gentry, including: Acidocroton gentryi, Citharexylum gentryi, Crossothamnus gentryi, Eleutherodactylus gentryi, Hedyosmum gentryi, Metalepis gentryi, Palicourea gentryi, Phyllanthus gentryi, Sobralia gentryi and Zamia gentryi, as well as a bird, Herpsilochmus gentryi. In several instances, Gentry had been involved in the collection of the type specimens of these plants.

== Honors ==
- Marine Fellow, 1991: Pew Fellows Program in Conservation and the Environment
- Distinguished Service Award, 1990: Society for Conservation Biology
- Fellow, Linnean Society of London
- Honorary Member, Sociedade Botanico de Brasil

== Selected publications ==
- Gentry, A.H., A. G. Forsyth. 1998. A Field Guide to the Families and Genera of Woody Plants of Northwest South America : (Colombia, Ecuador, Peru) : With Supplementary Notes (paperback). Conservation International, Washington, DC
- Gentry, A.H., A. G. Forsyth, R. Vasquez (Illustrator),. 1996. A Field Guide to the Families and Genera of Woody Plants of Northwest South America : (Colombia, Ecuador, Peru) : With Supplementary Notes on Herbaceo. University of Chicago Press Hardcover
- Gentry, A.H., A. G. Forsyth. 1993. A Field Guide to the Families and Genera of Woody Plants of Northwest South America : (Colombia, Ecuador, Peru). Conservation International, Washington, DC
- Gentry, A.H. 1992. A synopsis of Bignoniaceae ethnobotany and economic botany. Annals of the Missouri Botanical Garden 21(3): 266-270
- Gentry, A.H. 1992. Exarata (Bignoniaceae), a new genus from the Choco region of Ecuador and Columbia. Systematic Botany 17(3): 503
- Gentry, A.H. 1992. Six new species of Bignoniaceae from upper Amazonia. Novon 2(2): 159
- Gentry, A.H. 1992. Tropical forest biodiversity: Distributional pattern and their conservational significance. Oikos 63(1): 19
- Gentry, A.H. and R. Ortiz. 1992. A new species of Aptandra (Olacacea) from Amazonian Peru. Novon 2(2): 153
- Dodson, C.H. and A.H. Gentry. 1991. Biological extinction in western Ecuador. Annals of the Missouri Botanical Garden 78(2): 273
- Faber-Langendoen, D. and A.H. Gentry. 1991. The structure and diversity of rain forests at Bajo Calima, Choco region, western Columbia. Biotropica 23(1): 2
- Gentry, A.H. 1990. Four Neotropical Rainforests. Yale University Press, Branford. (627 pp)
- Gentry, A. (1976). Bignoniaceae of Southern Central America: Distribution and Ecological Specificity. Biotropica, 8(2), 117-131. doi:10.2307/2989632
