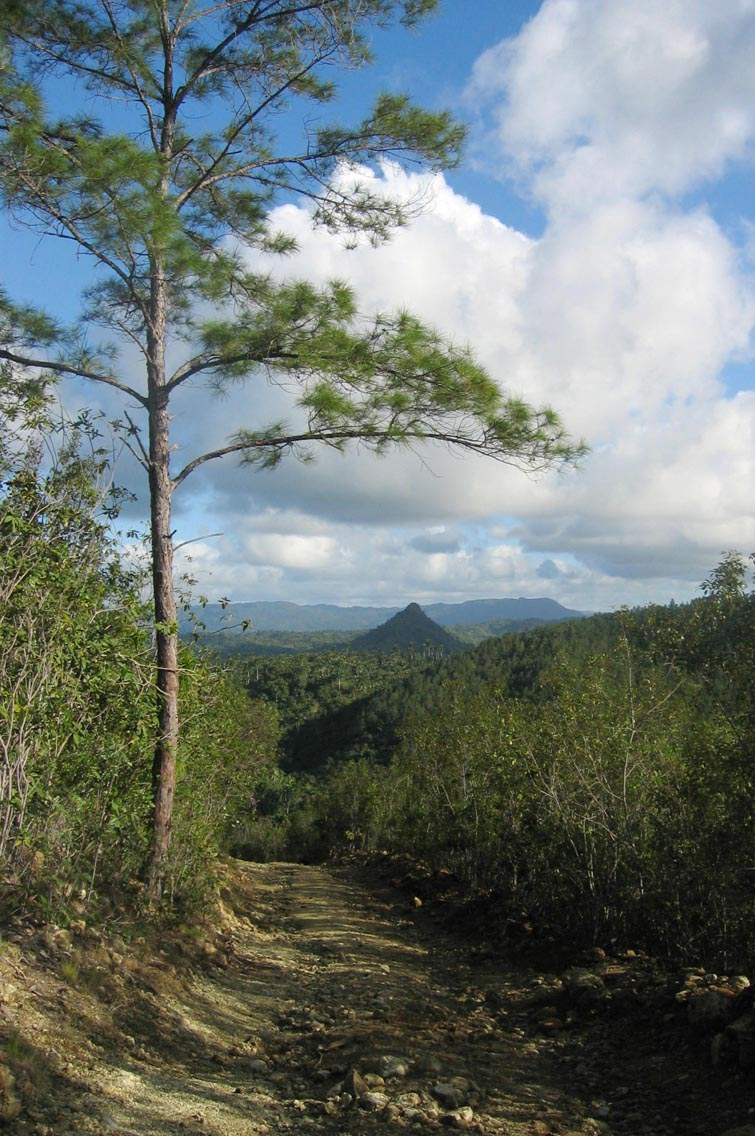
- Tree near Baracoa, Cuba

Conservation status
- Least Concern (IUCN 3.1)

Scientific classification
- Kingdom: Plantae
- Clade: Tracheophytes
- Clade: Gymnosperms
- Division: Pinophyta
- Class: Pinopsida
- Order: Pinales
- Family: Pinaceae
- Genus: Pinus
- Subgenus: P. subg. Pinus
- Section: P. sect. Trifoliae
- Subsection: P. subsect. Australes
- Species: P. cubensis

Binomial name
- Pinus cubensis Griseb.
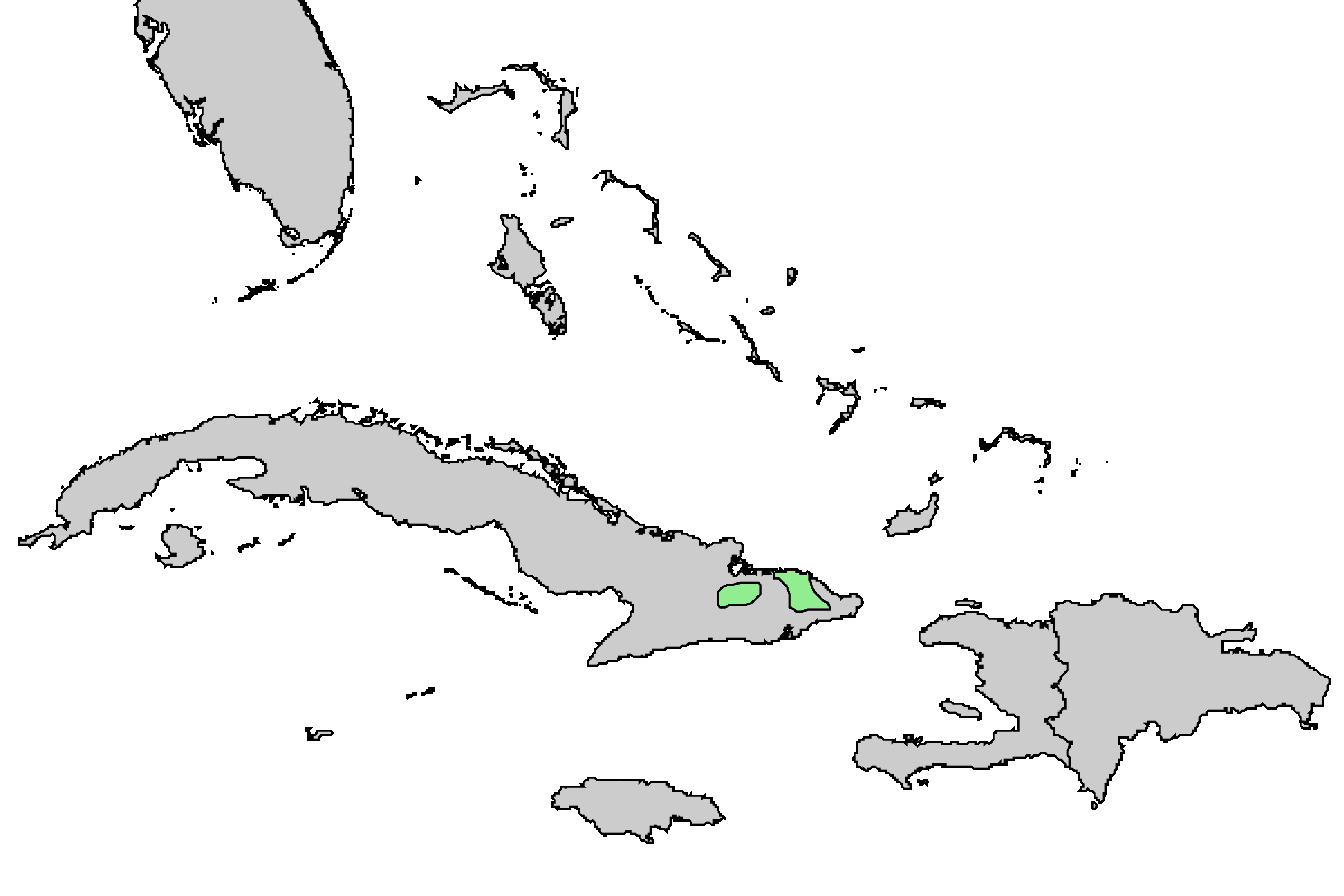
- Natural range of Pinus cubensis

= Pinus cubensis =

Species of conifer

Pinus cubensis, or Cuban pine, is a species of conifer in the family Pinaceae, a pine endemic to the eastern highlands of the island of Cuba, inhabiting both the Sierra Nipe-Cristal and Sierra Maestra mountain ranges.

== Taxonomy ==
The closely related Hispaniolan pine (P. occidentalis), native to the neighboring island of Hispaniola, is treated as synonymous by some botanists. Modern systematic studies recognize P. cubensis it as a valid species, nevertheless, there is disagreement about whether the Sierra Maestra populations in the south are part of P. cubensis or conform another species named P. maestrensis.

The Sierra Nipe-Cristal and Sierra Maestra population may have diverged recently, as indicated by recent genetic studies that have found some ancestral genetic lineages that are shared among the two regions and only some rare variants exclusive for each region.
