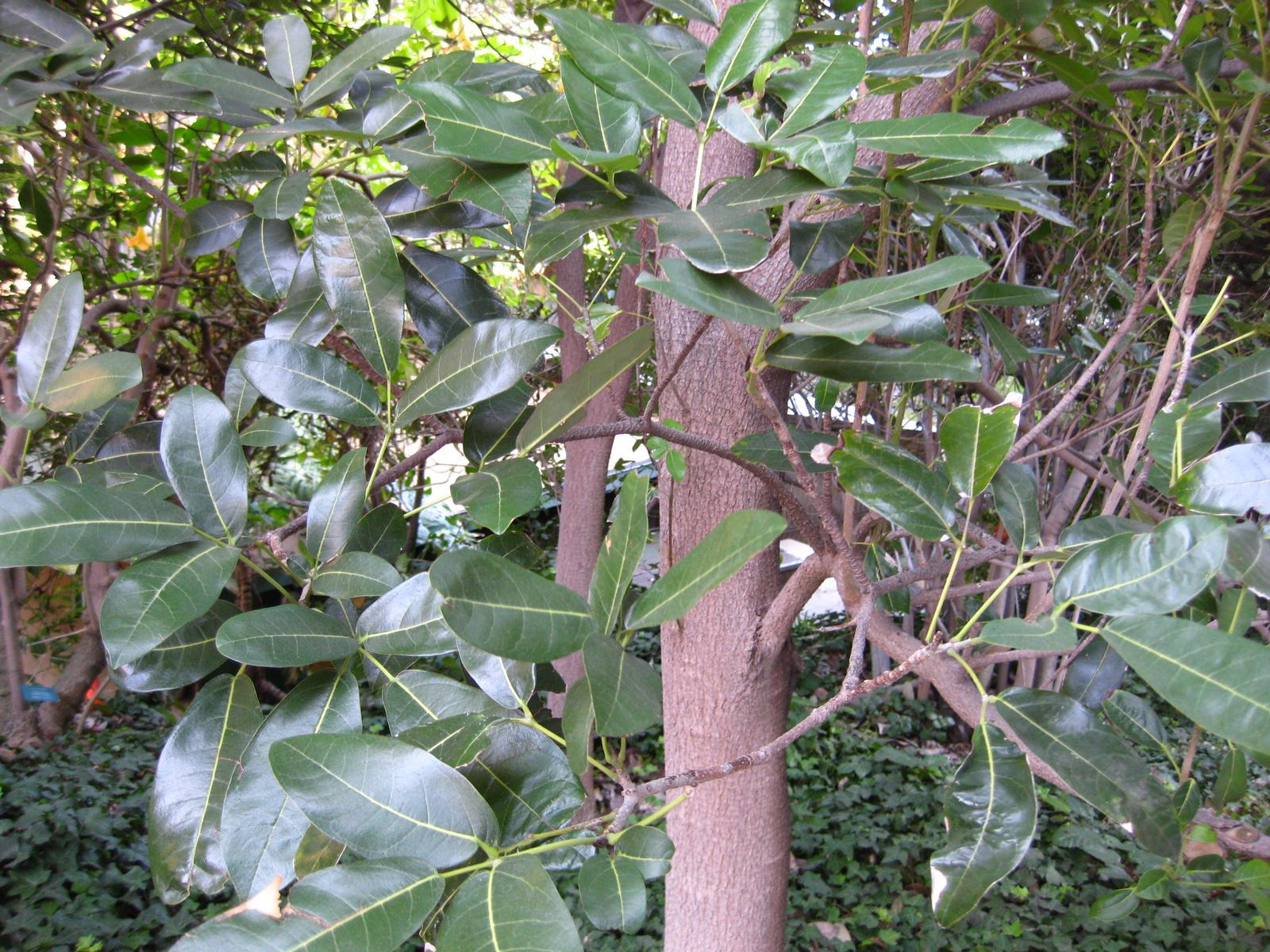

Conservation status
- Vulnerable (IUCN 2.3)

Scientific classification
- Kingdom: Plantae
- Clade: Tracheophytes
- Clade: Angiosperms
- Clade: Eudicots
- Clade: Asterids
- Order: Lamiales
- Family: Bignoniaceae
- Genus: Tabebuia
- Species: T. hypoleuca

Binomial name
- Tabebuia hypoleuca (Wright ex Sauvalle) Urban

Synonyms
- Tabebuia acunana Borhidi & O.Muñiz; Tecoma hypoleuca C.Wright ex Sauvalle

= Tabebuia hypoleuca =

Species of flowering plant

Tabebuia hypoleuca is a species of plant in the family Bignoniaceae. It is endemic to Cuba.
