= Crossothamnus gentryi =

Conservation status
- Vulnerable (IUCN 3.1)

Scientific classification
- Kingdom: Plantae
- Clade: Tracheophytes
- Clade: Angiosperms
- Clade: Eudicots
- Clade: Asterids
- Order: Asterales
- Family: Asteraceae
- Genus: Crossothamnus
- Species: C. gentryi

Binomial name
- Crossothamnus gentryi R.M.King & H.Rob.

Species of flowering plant

Crossothamnus gentryi is a flowering tree in the family Asteraceae. It is found in Ecuador and Peru. Its natural habitat is subtropical or tropical moist montane forests. It is threatened by habitat loss.
