= Spirotecoma =

Scientific classification
- Kingdom: Plantae
- Clade: Tracheophytes
- Clade: Angiosperms
- Clade: Eudicots
- Clade: Asterids
- Order: Lamiales
- Family: Bignoniaceae
- Clade: Crescentiina
- Clade: Tabebuia alliance
- Genus: Spirotecoma (Baill.) Dalla Torre & Harms

Synonyms
- Cotema Britton & P.Wilson; Neurotecoma K.Schum.

Genus of flowering plants

Spirotecoma is a genus of plants in the family Bignoniaceae.

Species include:

- Spirotecoma apiculata (Britton) Alain
- Spirotecoma holguinensis (Britton) Alain
- Spirotecoma rubriflora (Leonard) Alain
- Spirotecoma spiralis (C.Wright ex Griseb.) Pichon
