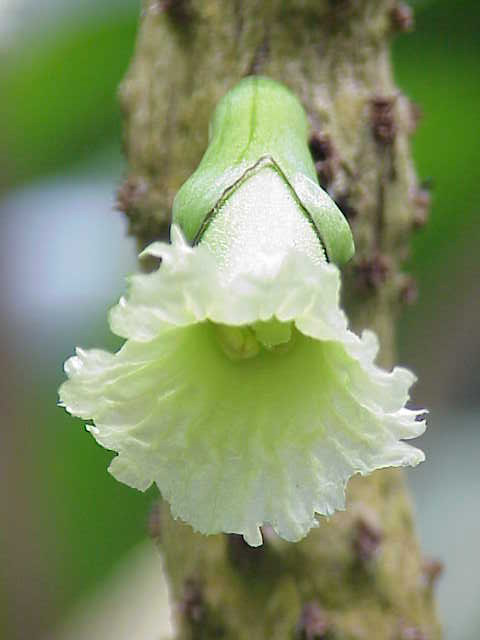
- Amphitecna macrophylla

Scientific classification
- Kingdom: Plantae
- Clade: Tracheophytes
- Clade: Angiosperms
- Clade: Eudicots
- Clade: Asterids
- Order: Lamiales
- Family: Bignoniaceae
- Clade: Crescentiina
- Clade: Tabebuia alliance
- Tribe: Crescentieae
- Genus: Amphitecna; Miers

Synonyms
- Heterotypic Synonyms: Dendrosicus Raf.; Enallagma (Miers) Baill.; Neotuerckheimia Donn.Sm.

= Amphitecna =

Genus of flowering plants

Amphitecna is a genus of plants in the family Bignoniaceae.

Species include:

- Amphitecna apiculata A.H.Gentry
- Amphitecna breedlovei A.H.Gentry
- Amphitecna brevicalyx Ortíz-Rodr. & Hurt.-Rev.
- Amphitecna costata A.H.Gentry
- Amphitecna donnell-smithii (Sprague) L.O.Williams
- Amphitecna fonceti Ortíz-Rodr. & Gómez-Domínguez
- Amphitecna gentryi W.C.Burger
- Amphitecna isthmica (A.H.Gentry) A.H.Gentry
- Amphitecna kennedyae (A.H.Gentry) A.H.Gentry
- Amphitecna latifolia (Mill.) A.H.Gentry
- Amphitecna loreae Ortíz-Rodr. & Burelo
- Amphitecna lundellii A.H.Gentry
- Amphitecna macrophylla (Seem.) Miers ex Baill.
- Amphitecna molinae L.O.Williams
- Amphitecna montana L.O.Williams
- Amphitecna parviflora A.H.Gentry
- Amphitecna regalis (Linden) A.H.Gentry
- Amphitecna sessilifolia (Donn.Sm.) L.O.Williams
- Amphitecna silvicola L.O.Williams
- Amphitecna spathicalyx (A.H.Gentry) A.H.Gentry
- Amphitecna steyermarkii (A.H.Gentry) A.H.Gentry
- Amphitecna tuxtlensis A.H.Gentry
