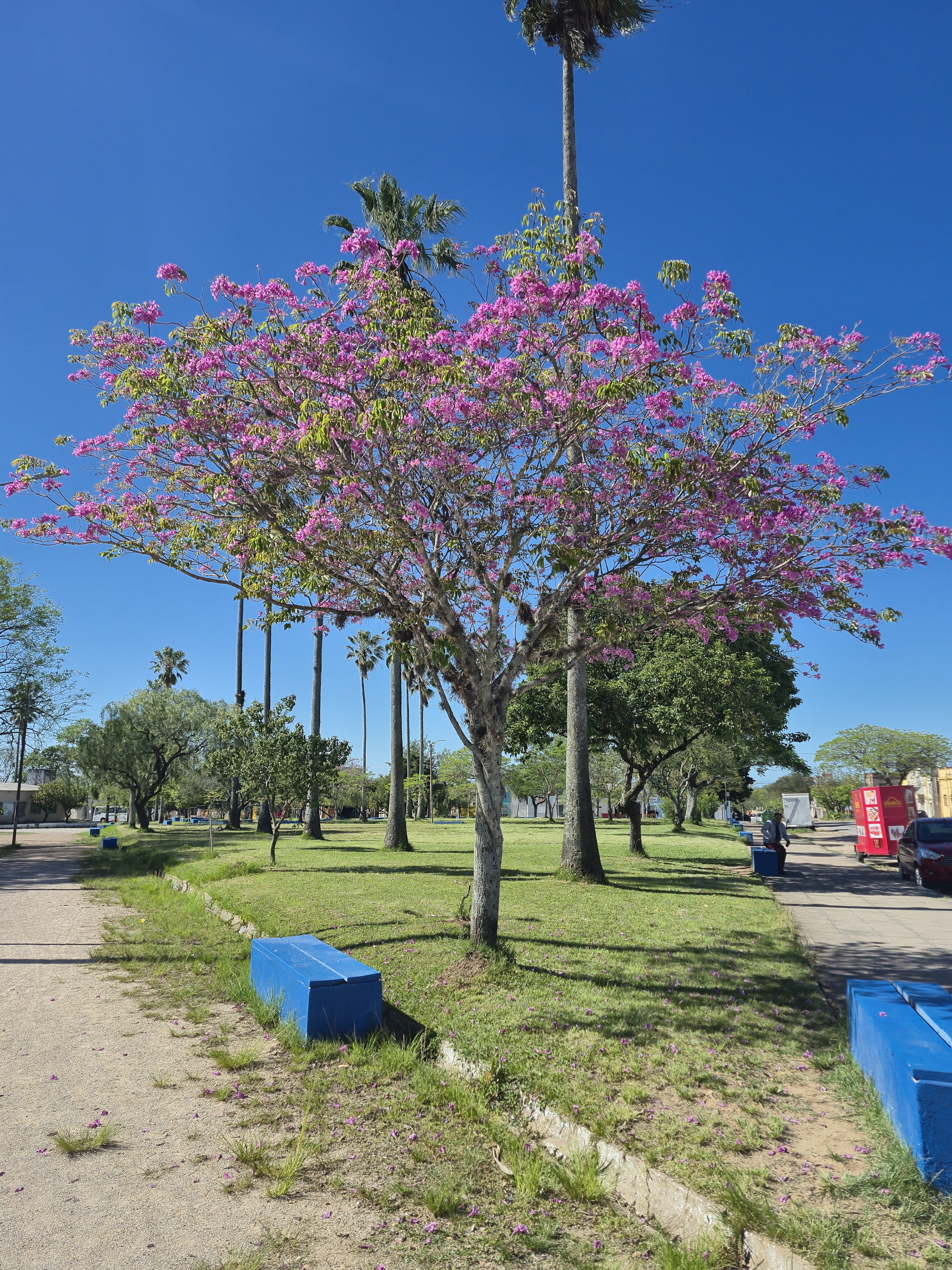

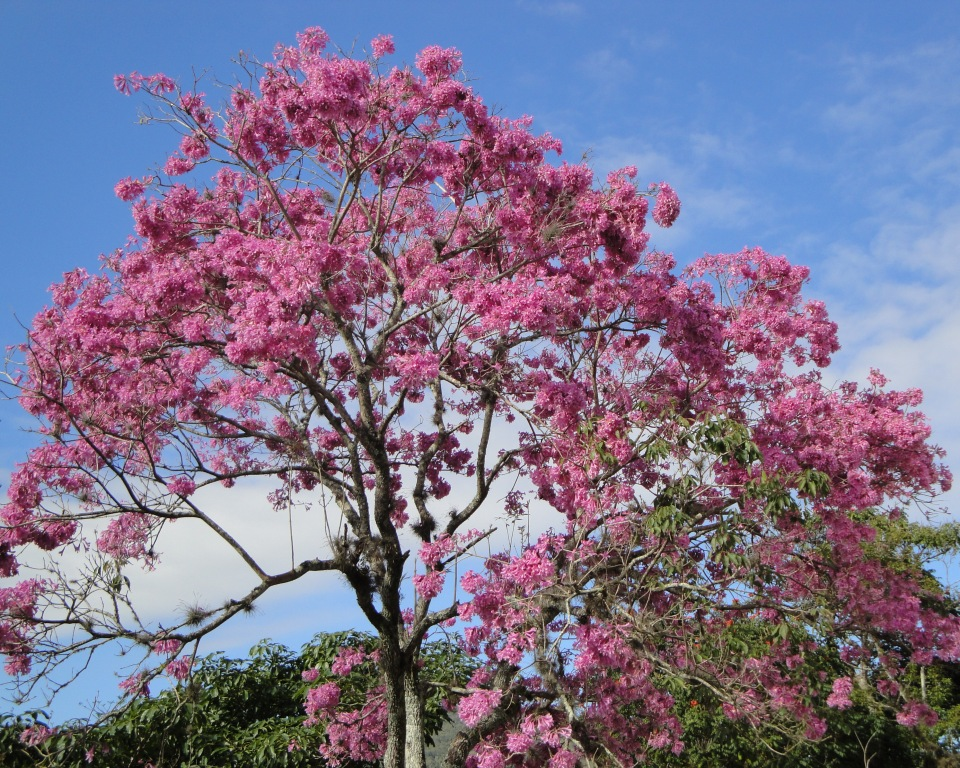

Scientific classification
- Kingdom: Plantae
- Clade: Tracheophytes
- Clade: Angiosperms
- Clade: Eudicots
- Clade: Asterids
- Order: Lamiales
- Family: Bignoniaceae
- Genus: Handroanthus
- Species: H. heptaphyllus

Binomial name
- Handroanthus heptaphyllus (Vell.) Mattos

Synonyms
- Bignonia heptaphylla Vell.; Handroanthus avellanedae var. paullensis (Toledo) Mattos; Handroanthus eximius (Miq.) Mattos; Handroanthus impetiginosus var. lepidotus (Bureau) Mattos; Tabebuia avellanedae var. paulensis Toledo; Tabebuia eximia (Miq.) Sandwith; Tabebuia heptaphylla (Vell.) Toledo; Tabebuia impetiginosa var. lepidota (Bureau) Toledo; Tabebuia ipe (Mart. ex K.Schum.) Standl.; Tecoma curialis Saldanha; Tecoma eximia Miq.; Tecoma impetiginosa var. lepidota Bureau; Tecoma ipe Mart. ex K.Schum.

= Handroanthus heptaphyllus =

Species of tree

Handroanthus heptaphyllus, commonly referred to as the pink trumpet tree or pink tab, is a Bignoniaceae tree native to tropical and subtropical regions of South America. It grows in the high forest watershed of the Paraná River, Paraguay River and Uruguay River. It has a limited distribution, almost exclusively inhabiting low lands with wet and deep soils, where it forms part of the upper layer of tree cover.

Along with all the other species in the Handroanthus genus, it is the national tree of Paraguay, as proposed by the School of Chemical Sciences at the National University of Asunción in celebration of the bicentenary of Paraguay's independence.

== Description ==
Handroanthus heptaphyllus can reach up to 40 m in height. The bark is brown-gray, very rough, with deep cracks in adult specimens. H. heptaphyllus requires specific light and humidity conditions, and is susceptible to frost when young. The tree is considered decorative, and is frequently used in parks, squares and public woodland.

It is often confused with Handroanthus impetiginosus, which has similar characteristics except for tree height and leaf size. As per Brazilian botanist Lúcia Lohmann, Handroanthus heptaphyllus is a short-medium height tree with a maximum height of 15 m.

Its leaves are palmate compound with opposite orientation. Each compound leaf contains 5-7 elliptical leaflets that are 10-15 cm long and have serrated edges. The tree is semi-deciduous with purple/pink tubular flowers that develop before the leaves. The flowers can vary in color from bright pink to pale pink or even white. The fruit of H. heptaphyllus is shaped like a long pod up to 30–40 cm long and 1-1.5 cm wide. The pods are brown when ripe and eventually open longitudinally and drop up to 150 winged seeds. It withstands high winds and has a strong and deep root system.

Flowering begins in the first half of September. Approximately 30 days after flowering begins, the first leaves begin to appear. Ripe fruit appears between January and February.

== Properties ==
The wood is hard and heavy, with noticeable differences between sapwood and heartwood. The heartwood turns a dark color with oxidation. The wood is very weatherproof. It is used in the construction of boats, docks, truck beds, beams, crosspieces, stairs, floors, as well as woodturning. Sawing produces a pale yellow sawdust containing lapachol. The wood has tannins and pigments.

The sawdust or wood chips, bark and leaves can be used for medicinal purposes.

The tree is easily propagated by seeds. The number of seeds/kg is 32,000 to 35,000. Planting should be done as quickly as possible, as the seeds will only germinate during the first 12–15 days. Vegetative propagation through the rootstock is also possible. In this species, certain trees produce white flowers. These "white lapachos" are often reproduced by grafting.
