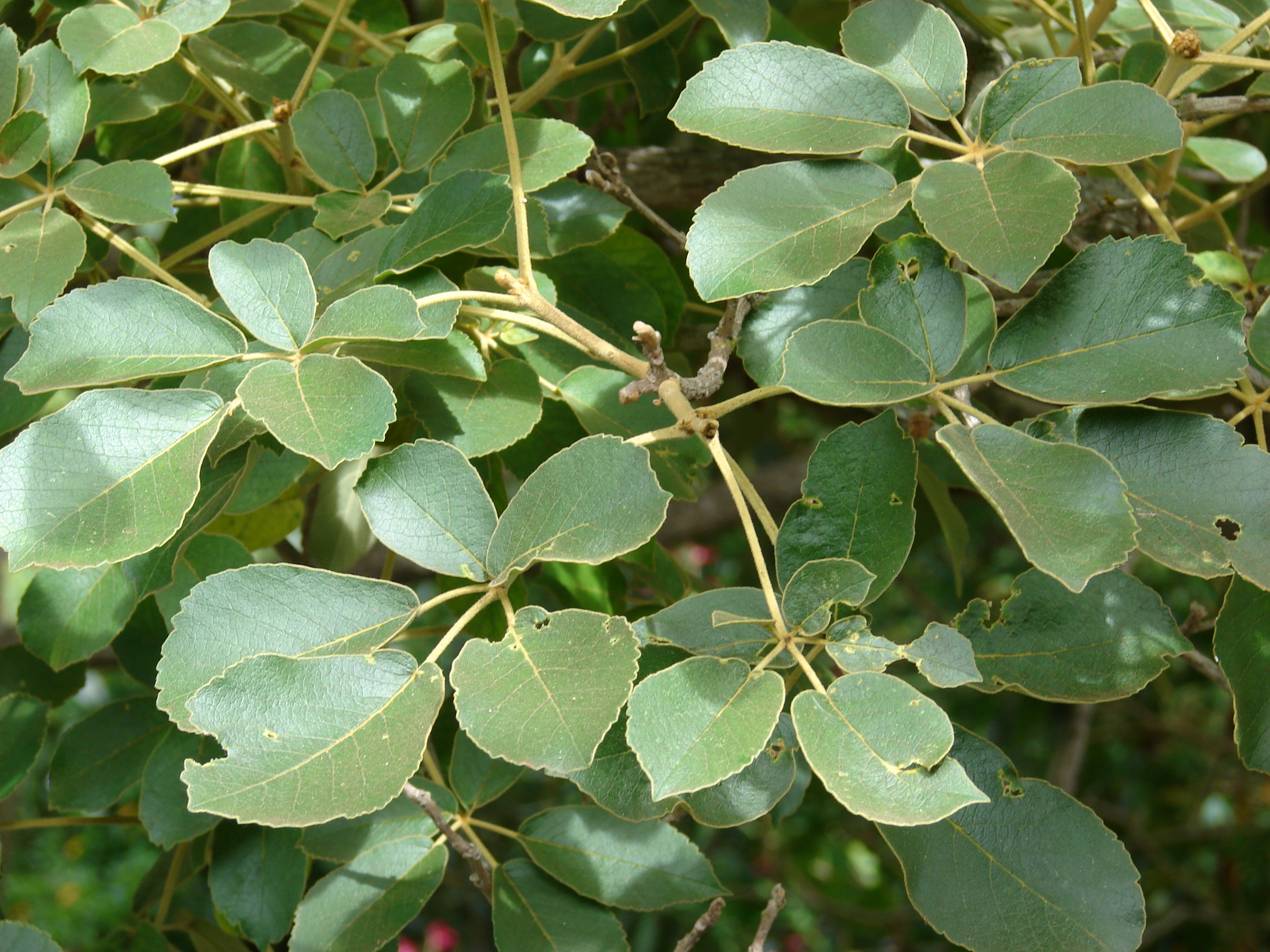

Conservation status
- Endangered (IUCN 3.1)

Scientific classification
- Kingdom: Plantae
- Clade: Tracheophytes
- Clade: Angiosperms
- Clade: Eudicots
- Clade: Asterids
- Order: Lamiales
- Family: Bignoniaceae
- Genus: Handroanthus
- Species: H. serratifolius

Binomial name
- Handroanthus serratifolius (Vahl) S.O. Grose

Synonyms
- Bignonia serratifolia Vahl; Tecoma serratifolia (Vahl) G. Don; Tabebuia serratifolia (Vahl) G. Nicholson

= Handroanthus serratifolius =

Species of flowering plant

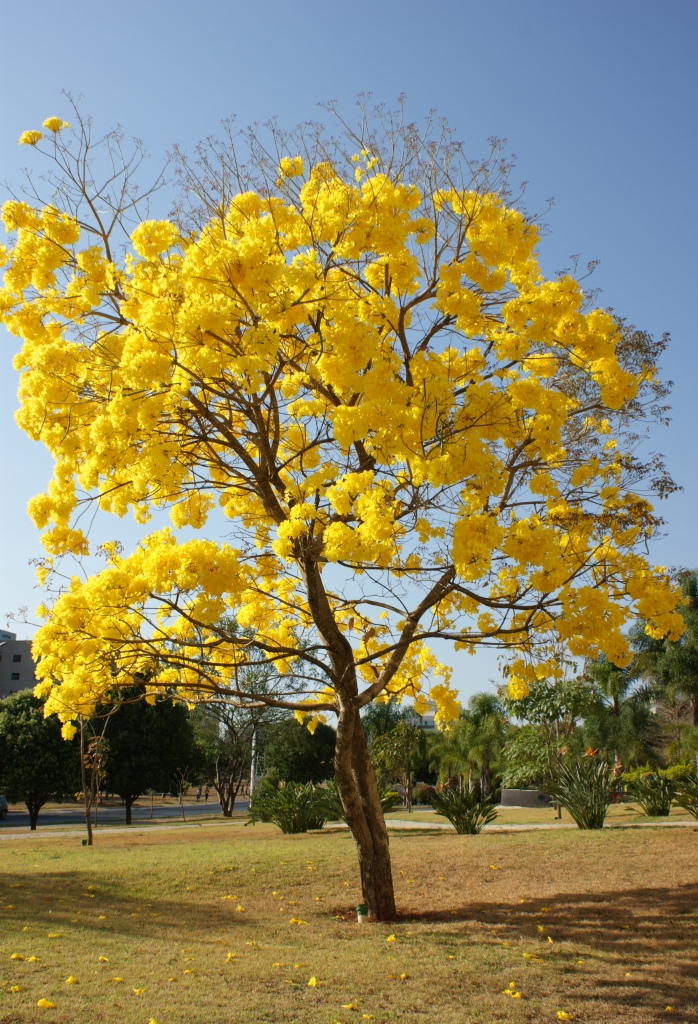
Handroanthus serratifolius in Brazil

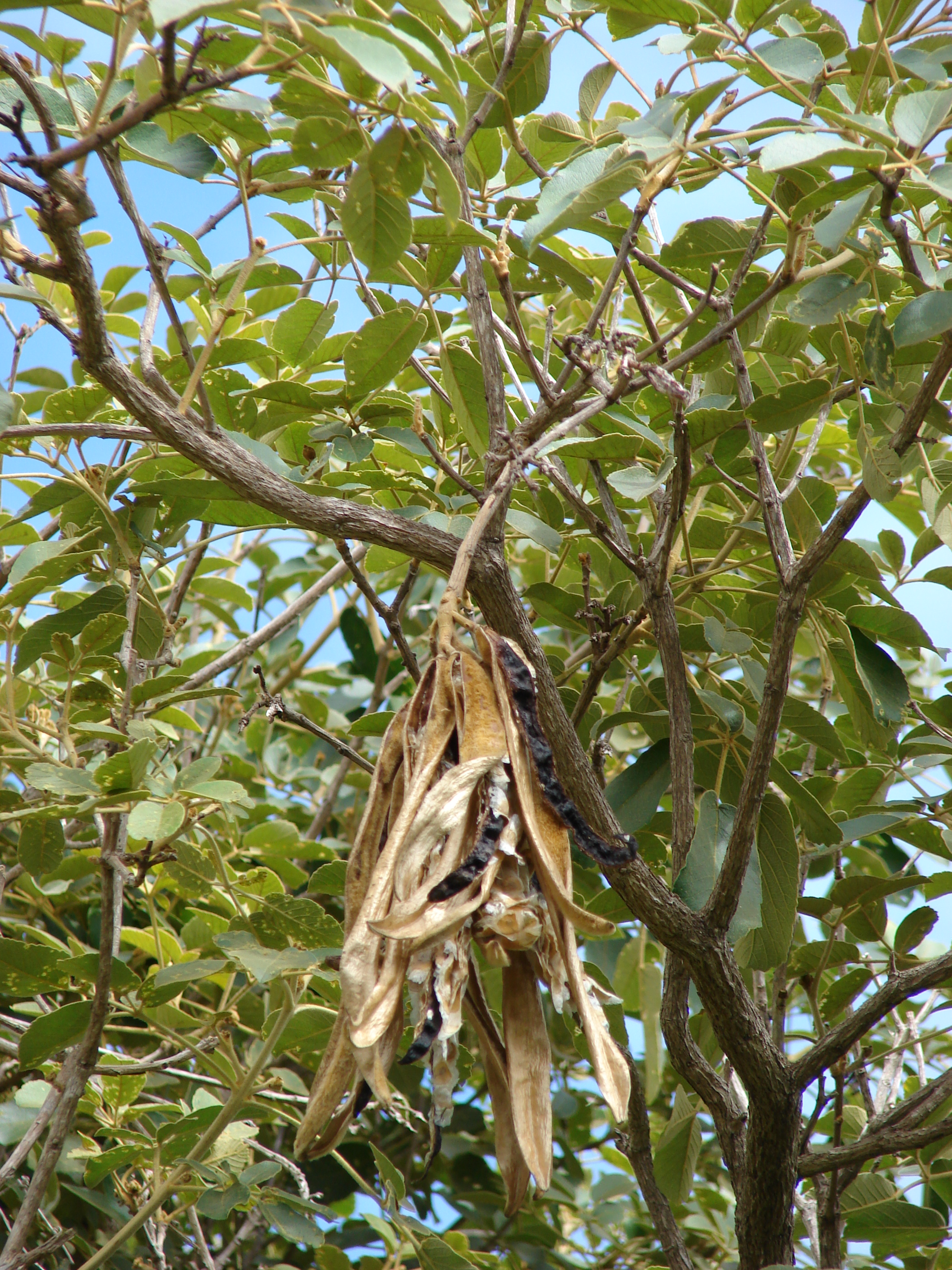
A Handroanthus serratifolius splitting seedpods

Handroanthus serratifolius is a species of tree, commonly known as yellow lapacho, pau d'arco, yellow poui, yellow ipe, pau d'arco amarelo, or ipê-amarelo. It is in the family Bignoniaceae.

== Description ==
It is a tree native to forests throughout Central and South America. This plant grows in the cerrado vegetation of Brazil, reaching up to French Guiana, Bolivia, Paraguay and Northern Argentina.

It is one of the largest and strongest of tropical forest trees, growing up to 150 feet (46 m) tall while the base can be 4–7 feet (1.2–2.1 m) in diameter.

=== Uses ===
It is a commercially farmed hardwood notable for its extreme hardness and resistance to fire and pests. It is sometimes traded as an "ironwood", or just as "ipê" (the entire genus Tabebuia), or as lapacho (properly Handroanthus serratifolius)

==== Chemistry ====
The bark of Handroanthus serratifolius contains chemical compounds including lapachol, quercetin, and other flavonoids.

==== National Flower of Brazil ====
The national flower of Brazil is the ipe-amarelo. The ipe-amarelo is actually a flowering tree that blooms in bright yellow flowers during the months of September and October. Blooms only last about a week.
