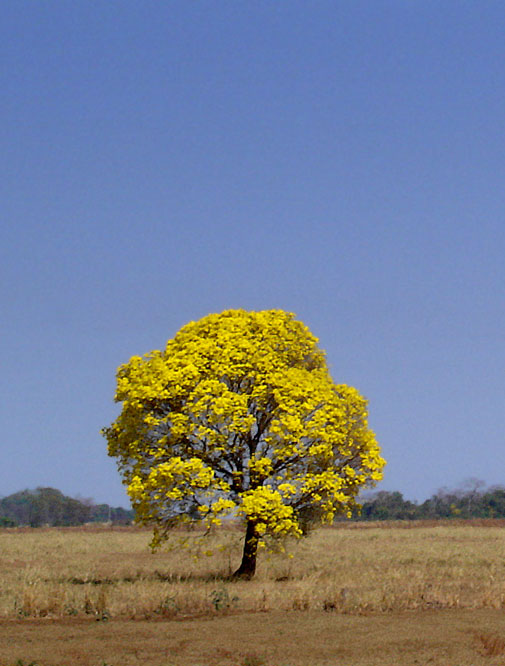
- Flowering araguaney or ipê-amarelo (Handroanthus chrysanthus) Brazil

Scientific classification
- Kingdom: Plantae
- Clade: Embryophytes
- Clade: Tracheophytes
- Clade: Spermatophytes
- Clade: Angiosperms
- Clade: Eudicots
- Clade: Asterids
- Order: Lamiales
- Family: Bignoniaceae
- Clade: Crescentiina
- Clade: Tabebuia alliance
- Genus: Handroanthus; J. R. Mattos

Type species
- Handroanthus albus (Chamisso) J. R. Mattos

Species
- 30 species, see text

= Handroanthus =

Genus of flowering plants (trees)

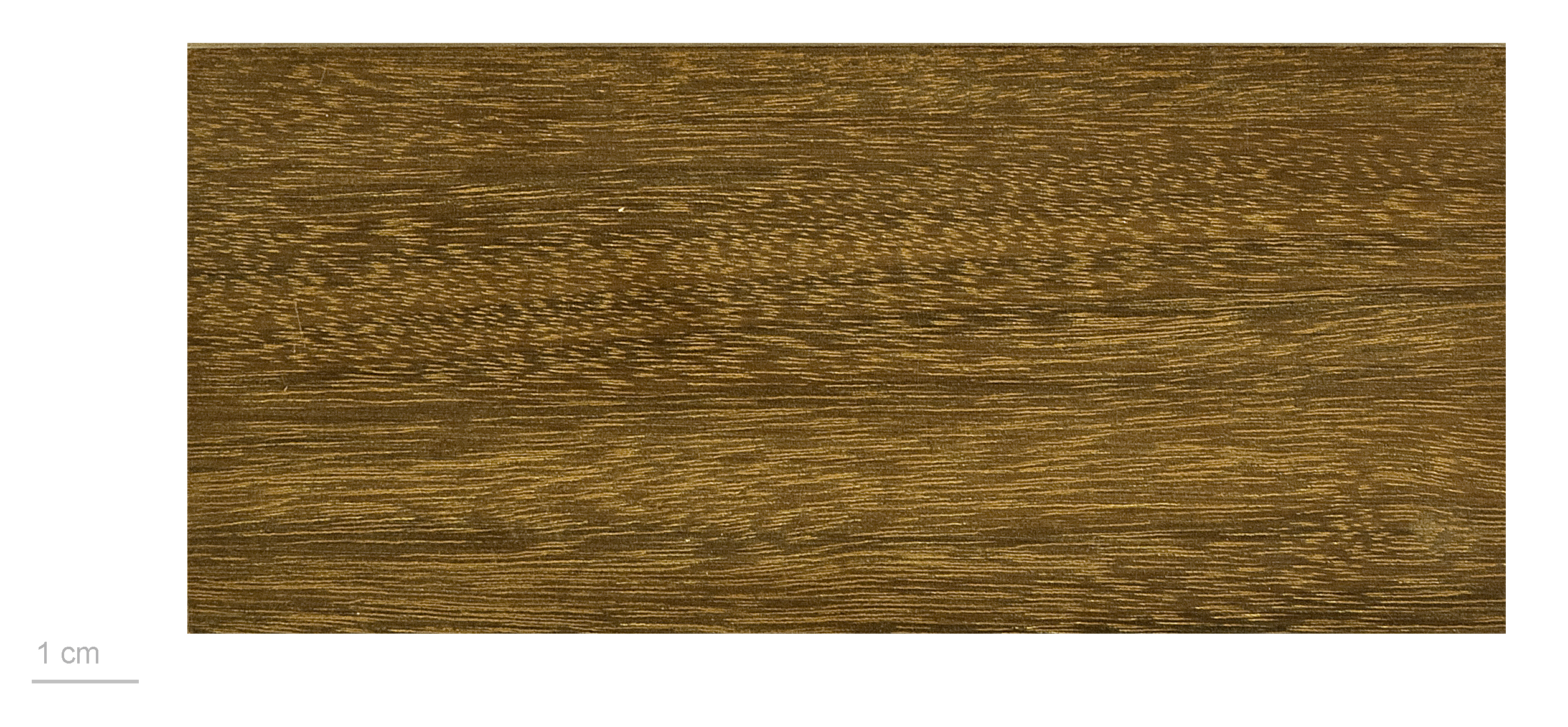
Handroanthus serratifolius - MHNT

Handroanthus is a genus of flowering plants in the family Bignoniaceae. It consists of 30 species of trees, known in Latin America by the common names poui, pau d'arco, or ipê. The latter sometimes appears as epay or simply ipe (unaccented) in English. The large timber species are sometimes called lapacho or guayacan, but these names are more properly applied to the species Handroanthus lapacho and Handroanthus guayacan, respectively.

The name Handroanthus was established in 1970, but was not generally accepted. In 1992, its species were included in Tabebuia in the most recent revision of that genus. Handroanthus was resurrected in 2007 when a comparison of DNA sequences by cladistic methods showed that Tabebuia, as then circumscribed, was not monophyletic.

Handroanthus are indigenous from Central America to northern Argentina, Paraguay, Brazil, and Chile, with one species, Handroanthus billbergii, native to northern South America and the Antilles. Handroanthus are frequently cultivated far from their natural range, as ornamental trees, for their large and showy flowers. They easily become naturalized where introduced because their seeds are prolifically produced and widely scattered by the wind. Several species are important timber trees of the American tropics. Medicinal use has been reported, but its efficacy and side effects have not been well studied.

== Species ==
Species include:

- Handroanthus albus (Cham.) Mattos
- Handroanthus billbergii (Bureau & K.Schum.) S.O.Grose
- Handroanthus chrysanthus (Jacq.) S.O.Grose
- Handroanthus chrysotrichus (Mart. ex DC.) Mattos
- Handroanthus guayacan (Seem.) S.O.Grose
- Handroanthus heptaphyllus (Vell.) Mattos
- Handroanthus impetiginosus (Mart. ex DC.) Mattos
- Handroanthus incanus (A.H.Gentry) S.O.Grose
- Handroanthus lapacho (K.Schum.) S.O.Grose
- Handroanthus ochraceus (Cham.) Mattos
- Handroanthus serratifolius (Vahl) S.O.Grose
- Handroanthus subtilis (Sprague & Sandwith) S.O.Grose
- Handroanthus umbellatus (Sond.) Mattos
- Handroanthus vellosoi (Toledo) Mattos

== Description ==
The following description is excerpted from the paper that resurrected Handroanthus in 2007.

- Trees or occasionally shrubs.
- Wood is very dense. Heartwood distinct from sapwood, olive brown to black, lapachol present in large quantities.
- Leaves palmately (3)5-9_foliate.
- Leaflets with various types of trichomes as well as lepidote scales.
- Inflorescence with dichotomous branching.
- Calyx coriaceous, campanulate, 5 dentate, pubescent.
- Corolla tubular, yellow or magenta with yellow throat.
- Stamens didynamous; Thecae divaricate; Staminode reduced.
- Ovary conical to linear, bilocular.
- Ovules in 2 to 10 series in each locule.
- Fruit an elongate dehiscent capsule.
- Seeds thin with 2 wings. Wings thin and sharply demarcated from seed body.

Handroanthus is distinguished from Tabebuia by several morphological characters. The wood is among the hardest and heaviest known. The heartwood is distinct from the sapwood and contains large quantities of lapachol. Handroanthus has the same lepidote scales as Tabebuia, but also has various types of hair. The calyx is 5-dentate and campanulate to cupular. The corolla is yellow, except in those four species where it is magenta with a yellow throat. Tabebuia has only two yellow-flowered species, Tabebuia aurea and Tabebuia nodosa. The fruit of Handroanthus is rarely glabrous like that of Tabebuia. It usually ranges from sparsely pubescent to densely tomentose.

== Uses ==
Handroanthus is widely used as an ornamental tree in the tropics in landscaping gardens, public squares, and boulevards due to its impressive and colorful flowering. Many flowers appear on still-leafless stems at the end of the dry season, making the floral display more conspicuous. Handroanthus impetiginosus, Handroanthus chrysotrichus, and Handroanthus ochraceus are well-known throughout the tropics. Handroanthus chrysanthus, Handroanthus guayacan, Handroanthus serratifolius, Handroanthus umbellatus, and Handroanthus vellosoi are also planted in warm climates.

Handroanthus heptaphyllus, Handroanthus serratifolius, Handroanthus guayacan, Handroanthus chrysanthus, and Handroanthus billbergii are important timber trees of the Neotropics. The wood of Handroanthus billbergii is valued for carving. Indigenous peoples of the Amazon made hunting bows from the wood, which is the source of the common name pau d'arco, "bow stick".

Much of the lumber from Handroanthus is exported. The wood is durable outdoors, where it is usually used for furniture and decking. It is increasingly popular as a decking material due to its insect resistance and durability. Handroanthus and the unrelated Guaiacum (Zygophyllaceae) produce the hardest, heaviest, and most durable wood of the American tropics. Dead trees of Handroanthus guayacan remain standing after they were killed by flooding of their habitat during construction of the Panama Canal.

The wood of Handroanthus brings a high price. The wood of other species is sometimes fraudulently sold as Handroanthus. By 2007, FSC-certified ipê wood had become readily available on the market, although certificates are occasionally forged.

Much of the ipê imported into the United States is used for decking. Starting in the late 1960s, importing companies targeted large boardwalk projects to sell ipê, beginning with the New York City Department of Parks and Recreation, which maintains the city's boardwalks, including along the beach of Coney Island. The city began using ipê around that time and has since converted the entire boardwalk—over 10 mi (16 km) long—to ipê. The ipê lasted about 25 years, at which time (1994) the department began replacing it with new ipê. La Sultana, a yacht refashioned from a Soviet spy vessel, was fitted with an ipê deck during its restoration. In 2008-2009, Wildwood, New Jersey, rebuilt a section of its boardwalk using ipê. The town had pledged to use domestic black locust, but it was not available in time.

Given that ipê trees typically grow in densities of only one or two trees per 1 acre (0.40 ha), large areas of forest must be searched and cut down to create paths to harvest the trees to fill orders for boardwalks and to a lesser extent, homeowner decks.

The bark of several species of Handroanthus is sold in South American markets. Similar-looking bark is often fraudulently passed off as Handroanthus. It is used in various ways to relieve certain symptoms of certain cancers. No evidence shows that it prevents the disease or slows its progression, as is often claimed.

The bark is dried, shredded, and then boiled to make a bitter or sour-tasting brownish-colored tea. Tea from the inner bark of pink ipê (Handroanthus impetiginosus) is known as pau d'arco, lapacho, or taheebo.

Handroanthus ochraceus (synonym: Tabebuia heteropoda), Handroanthus incanus, and other species are occasionally used as an additive to the entheogenic drink Ayahuasca.

== Ecology ==
The nectar of Handroanthus flowers is an important food source for several species of bees and hummingbirds.

Mycosphaerella tabebuiae, a plant pathogenic sac fungus was first discovered on a Handroanthus tree, known at that time as Tabebuia. The taxonomy of Mycosphaerella is in much confusion and the recognition of this name is questionable.

== Symbolism ==
Because of its popularity, Handroanthus has often been adopted as a symbol or emblem for nations or other political divisions.

The distinction between national flower and national tree is sometimes not entirely clear. Gentry (1992) gives the following information without making that distinction.

- Brazil - Handroanthus serratifolius
- Ecuador - Handroanthus chrysanthus
- Paraguay - Handroanthus heptaphyllus
- Venezuela - Handroanthus billbergii

== History ==
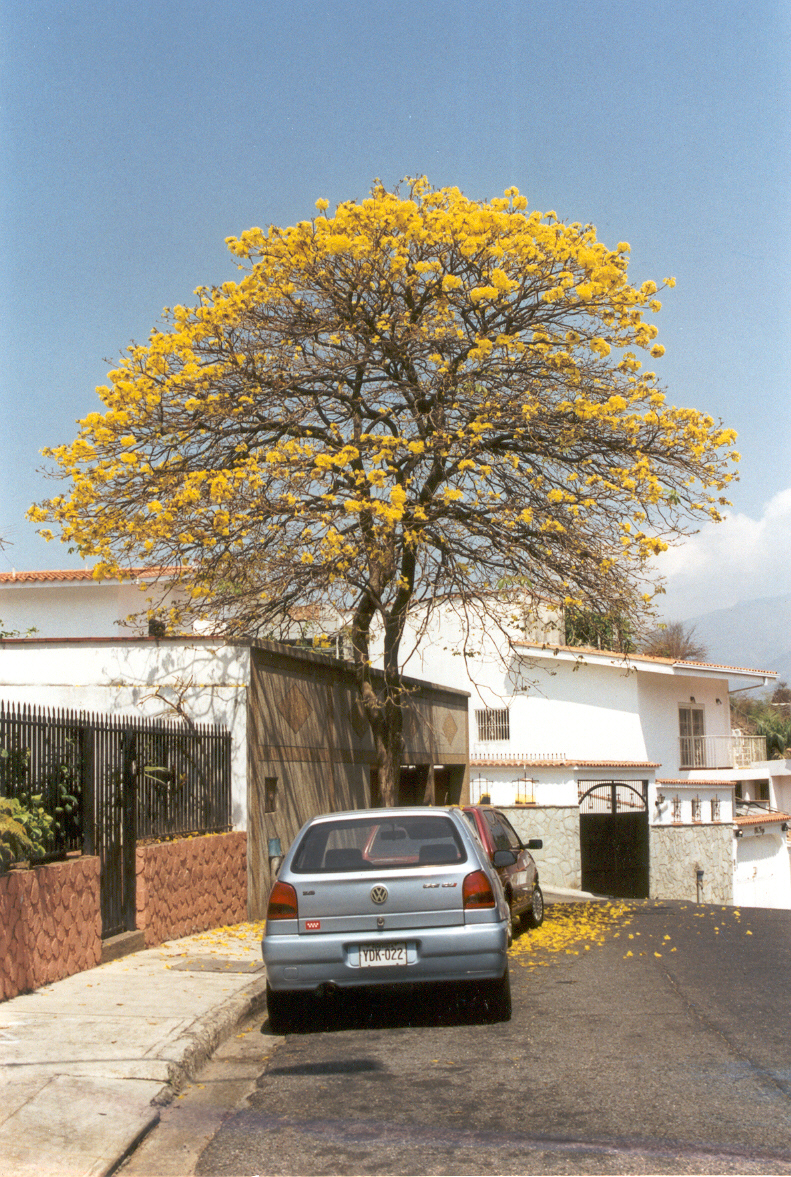
Araguaney (Handroanthus chrysanthus) tree on a Caracas street

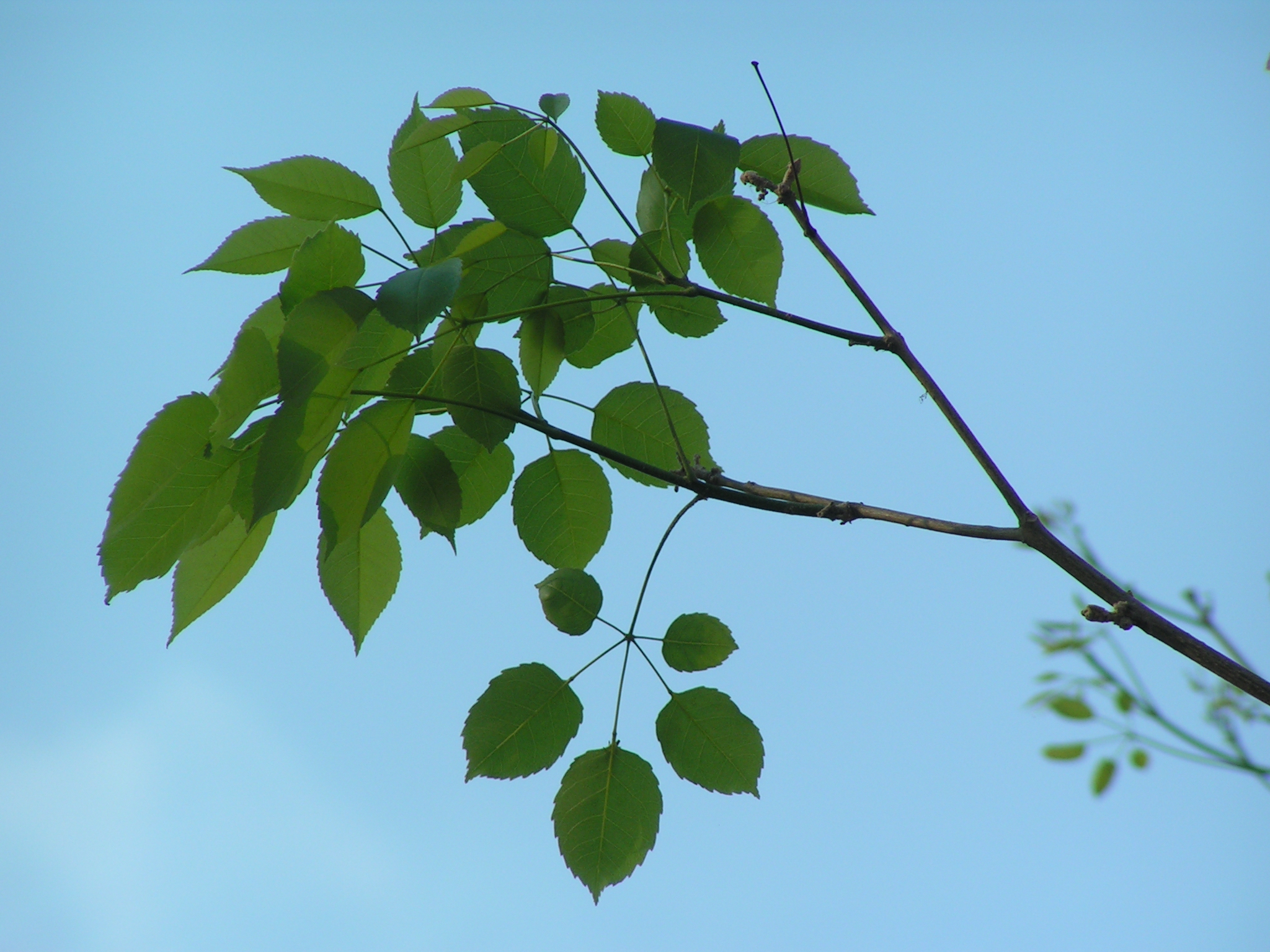
Leaves of pink ipê (Handroanthus impetiginosus) in detail

The genus Handroanthus was erected by Joáo Rodrigues de Mattos in 1970. It was named for the Brazilian botanist Oswaldo Handro. "Anthus" is derived from a Greek word for "flower".

Most botanists at that time did not agree with the separation of Handroanthus from Tabebuia. Alwyn H. Gentry objected strenuously and warned against "succumbing to further paroxysms of unwarranted splitting".

In 1992, Gentry published a full taxonomic treatment of Tabebuia, in which he described 99 species and one hybrid for the genus. These consist of the 67 species and one hybrid that remain in Tabebuia, the two species transferred to Roseodendron, and the 30 species that are now placed in Handroanthus. Gentry divided Tabebuia into 10 species groups. Handroanthus, as it is currently circumscribed, is composed of Gentry's groups 3, 4, and 5. Gentry believed group 5 to be natural, while groups 3 and 4 were artificial, designated for the sole purpose of easier identification.

In 2007, a molecular phylogenetic study resolved Tabebuia as consisting of three strongly supported clades, none of which was sister to either of the others. Thus Tabebuia was shown to be polyphyletic. One of these clades consisted of the two species that constitute the genus Roseodendron. Another contained the type species for Tabebuia, and consequently retained that name. The name Handroanthus was resurrected for the third clade, which contained its type species, Handroanthus albus.

Handroanthus is sister to a clade consisting of Spirotecoma, Parmentiera, Crescentia, and Amphitecna. It had for a long time been placed in the tribe Tecomeae, but that tribe has been greatly reduced to only 11 or 12 genera and no longer includes Handroanthus. Handroanthus is one of the 12 to 14 genera that make up a group informally known as the Tabebuia alliance. This group has not been assigned to any taxonomic rank, and neither has Crescentiina, the smallest group that it is a member of.

Cladistic analysis of DNA data has strongly supported Handroanthus, but sampling of taxa and DNA has not been sufficient to strongly support any relationships within the genus.
