= T. alba =

T. alba may refer to:

- Tabebuia alba or Tecoma alba, now known as Handroanthus albus, the ipê-amarelo-da-serra or golden trumpet tree, a tree species native to Cerrado vegetation in Brazil
- Tyto alba, the barn owl, an owl species and one of the most widespread of all birds

== See also ==
- Alba (disambiguation)
