= Taheebo extract =

Taheebo extract can refer to:

- The bark of Tabebuia, a genus of tree native to Central and South America
- Lapacho, a tea made from Tabebuia
