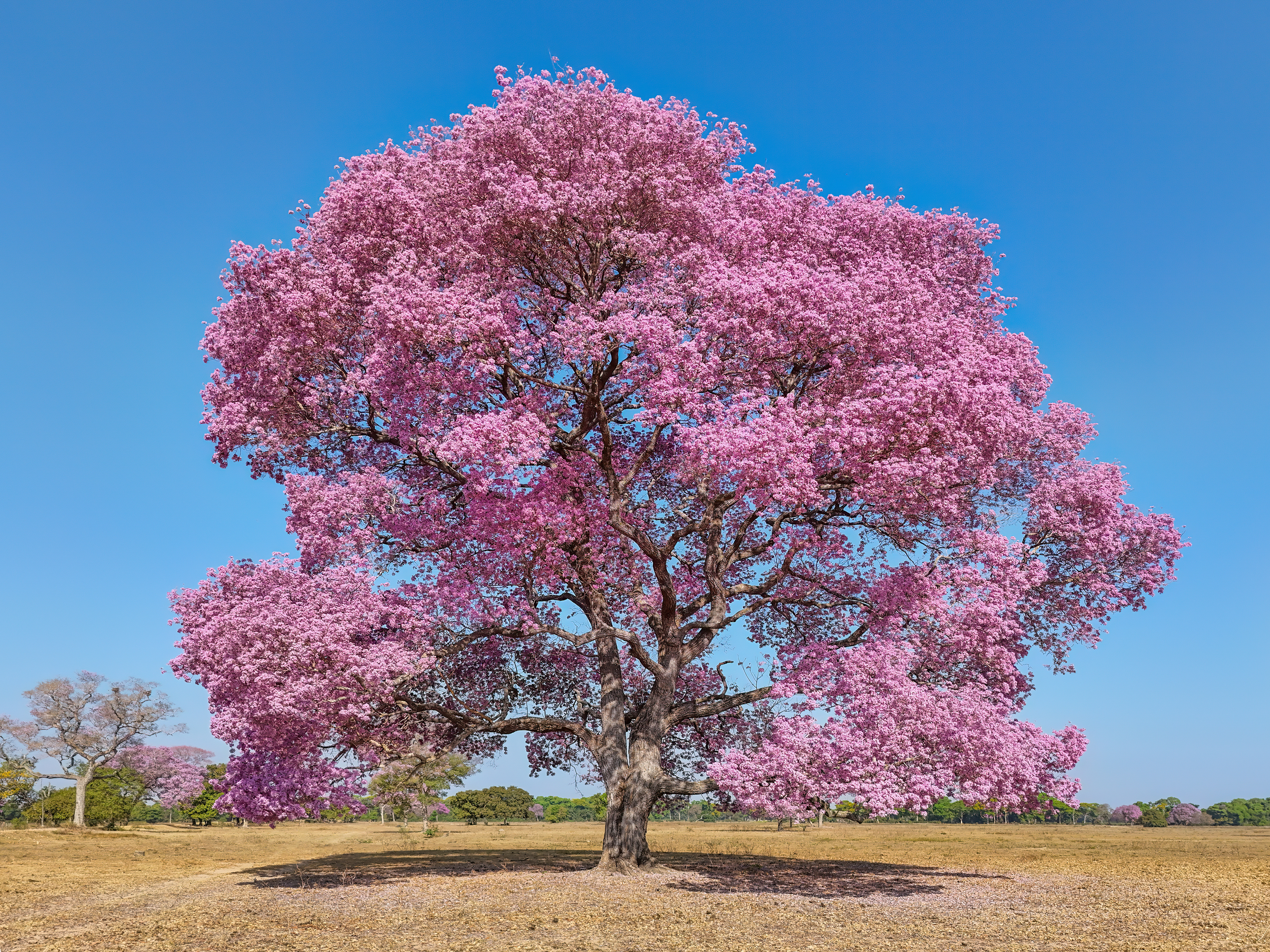
- Flowering in Mato Grosso, Brazil

Conservation status
- Near Threatened (IUCN 3.1)

Scientific classification
- Kingdom: Plantae
- Clade: Tracheophytes
- Clade: Angiosperms
- Clade: Eudicots
- Clade: Asterids
- Order: Lamiales
- Family: Bignoniaceae
- Genus: Handroanthus
- Species: H. impetiginosus

Binomial name
- Handroanthus impetiginosus (Mart. ex DC.) Mattos

Synonyms
- Synonyms list: Gelseminum avellanedae (Lorentz ex Griseb.) Kuntze; Handroanthus avellanedae (Lorentz ex Griseb.) Mattos; Tabebuia avellanedae Lorentz ex Griseb.; Tabebuia dugandii Standl.; Tabebuia impetiginosa (Mart. ex DC.) Standl.; Tabebuia ipe var. integra (Sprague) Sandwith; Tabebuia nicaraguensis S.F.Blake; Tabebuia palmeri Rose; Tabebuia schunkevigoi D.R.Simpson; Tecoma adenophylla Bureau & K.Schum. in C.F.P.von Martius & auct. suc. (eds.); Tecoma avellanedae (Lorentz ex Griseb.) Speg.; Tecoma avellanedae var. alba Lillo; Tecoma impetiginosa Mart. ex DC.; Tecoma integra (Sprague) Hassl.; Tecoma ipe f. leucotricha Hassl.; Tecoma ipe var. integra Sprague; Tecoma ipe var. integrifolia Hassl.

= Handroanthus impetiginosus =

Species of tree

Handroanthus impetiginosus, the pink ipê, pink lapacho, pink trumpet tree or macuelizo enano, is a tree in the family Bignoniaceae, distributed throughout North, Central and South America, from northern Mexico south to northern Argentina. Along with all the other species in the Handroanthus genus, it is the national tree of Paraguay.

== Description ==
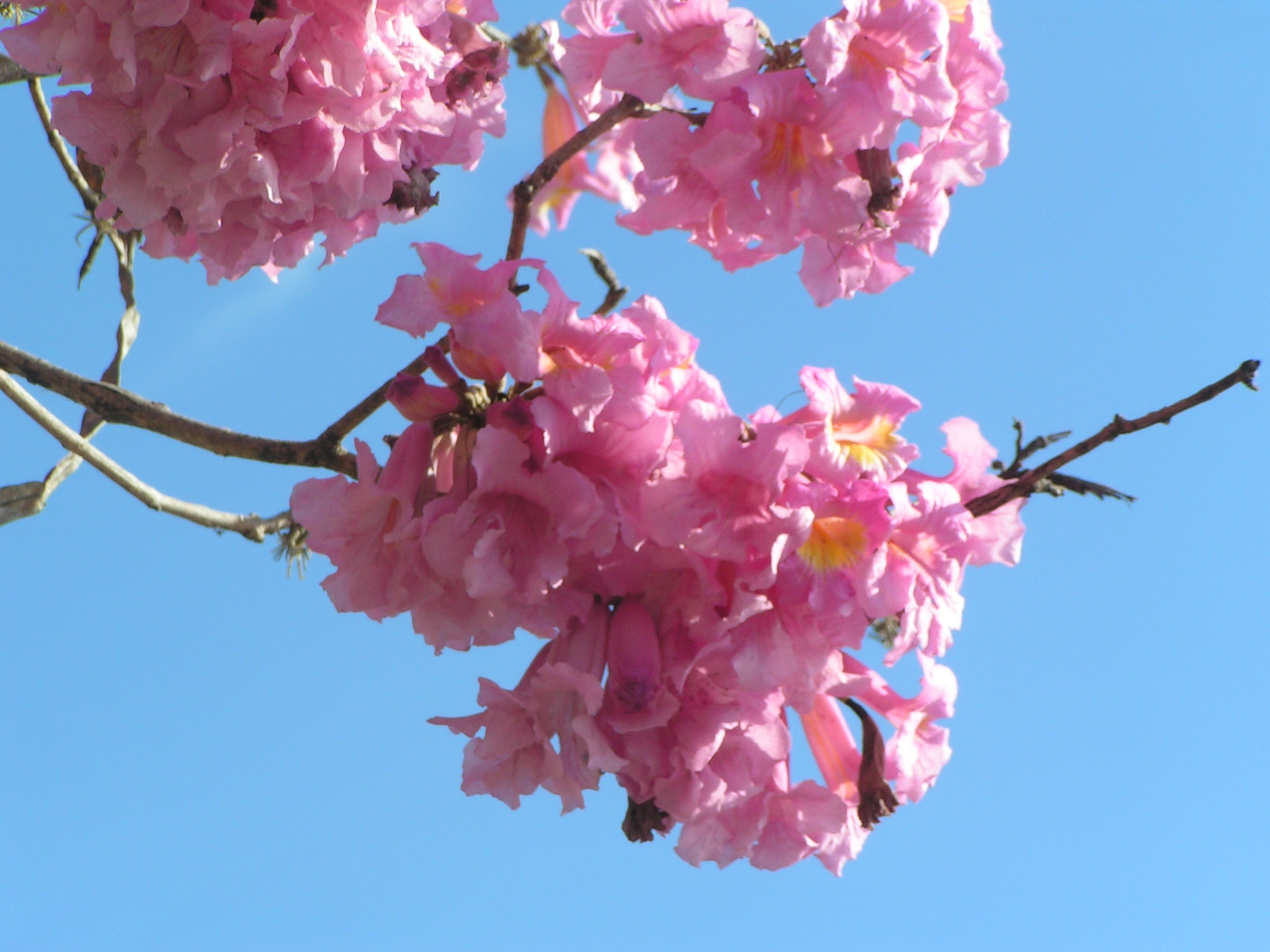
Inflorescences

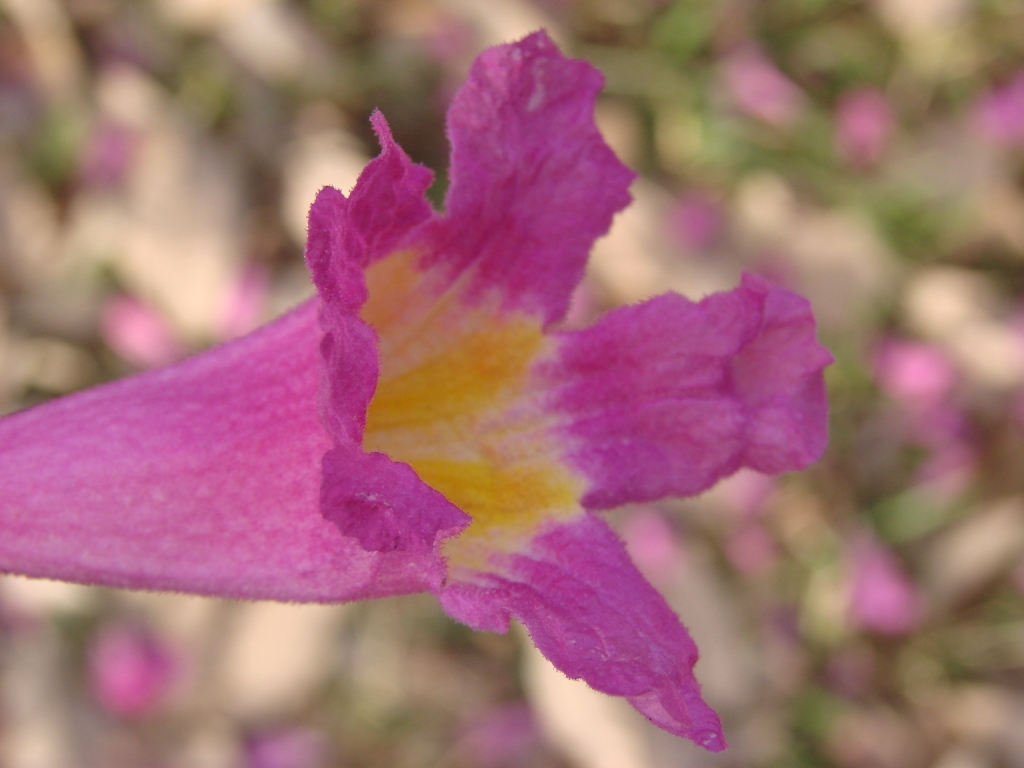
A single flower

It is a rather large deciduous tree, with trunks sometimes reaching 80 cm (31 in) in width and 30 m (98 ft) in height. Usually a third of that height is trunk, and two thirds are its longer branches. It has a large, globous, but often sparse canopy. The tree has a slow growth rate. Leaves are opposite and petiolate, 2 to 3 inches long, elliptic and lanceolate, with lightly serrated margins and pinnate venation. The leaves are palmately compound with usually 5 leaflets.

Its bark is brownish grey, tough and hard to peel. The wood is of a pleasant yellowish colour, barely knotted and very tough and heavy (0,935 kg/dm³). It's rich in tannins and therefore very resistant to weather and sun. It is not very useful for furniture since it is so hard to work by hand. It can be found as beams or fulfilling other structural uses where needed outdoors.

In the southern hemisphere, pink lapacho flowers between July and September, before the new leaves appear. The flower is large, tubular shaped, its corolla is often pink or magenta, though exceptionally white, about 2 in (5.1 cm) long. There are four stamens and a staminode. The fruit consists of a narrow dehiscent capsule containing several winged seeds.

The flowers are easily accessible to pollinators. Some hummingbirds - e.g. black jacobin (Florisuga fusca) and black-throated mango (Anthracothorax nigricollis) - seem to prefer them over the flowers of other Handroanthus species, while for others like the stripe-breasted starthroat (Heliomaster squamosus) it may even be a mainstay food source.

== Ecology ==
Harvest of wild Handroanthus impetiginosus for lumber to make flooring and decking (in which case it is referred to as ipê in the timber trade) has become a major cause of deforestation in the Amazon. Because the trees do not grow in concentrated stands but instead are found scattered throughout the forest, logging roads have to be built long distances to locate and harvest the trees. In most cases, once these trees are logged, the rest of the forest is cleared for agricultural use. Scientific examination of current logging practices, in which 90% of mature trees can be legally harvested, found that recovery from juvenile populations within 60 years was not likely under any feasible scenario (five were modeled). The parallel to the overharvesting of Swietenia macrophylla (big-leaf mahogany), a tree that grows in a similar distribution in the same areas as ipê, is interesting, yet ipê continues to be logged at prodigious rates with no sign of a listing in the Convention on Trade in International Species or other drastic actions likely necessary to prevent extinction. Swietenia mahagoni and Swietenia humilis (other species yielding mahogany wood) were so thoroughly depleted that by the early 1900s there were essentially none left to harvest in the wild. Unfortunately the current scenario is one in which Handroanthus is headed for similar unsustainable depletion of wild populations.

== Uses ==
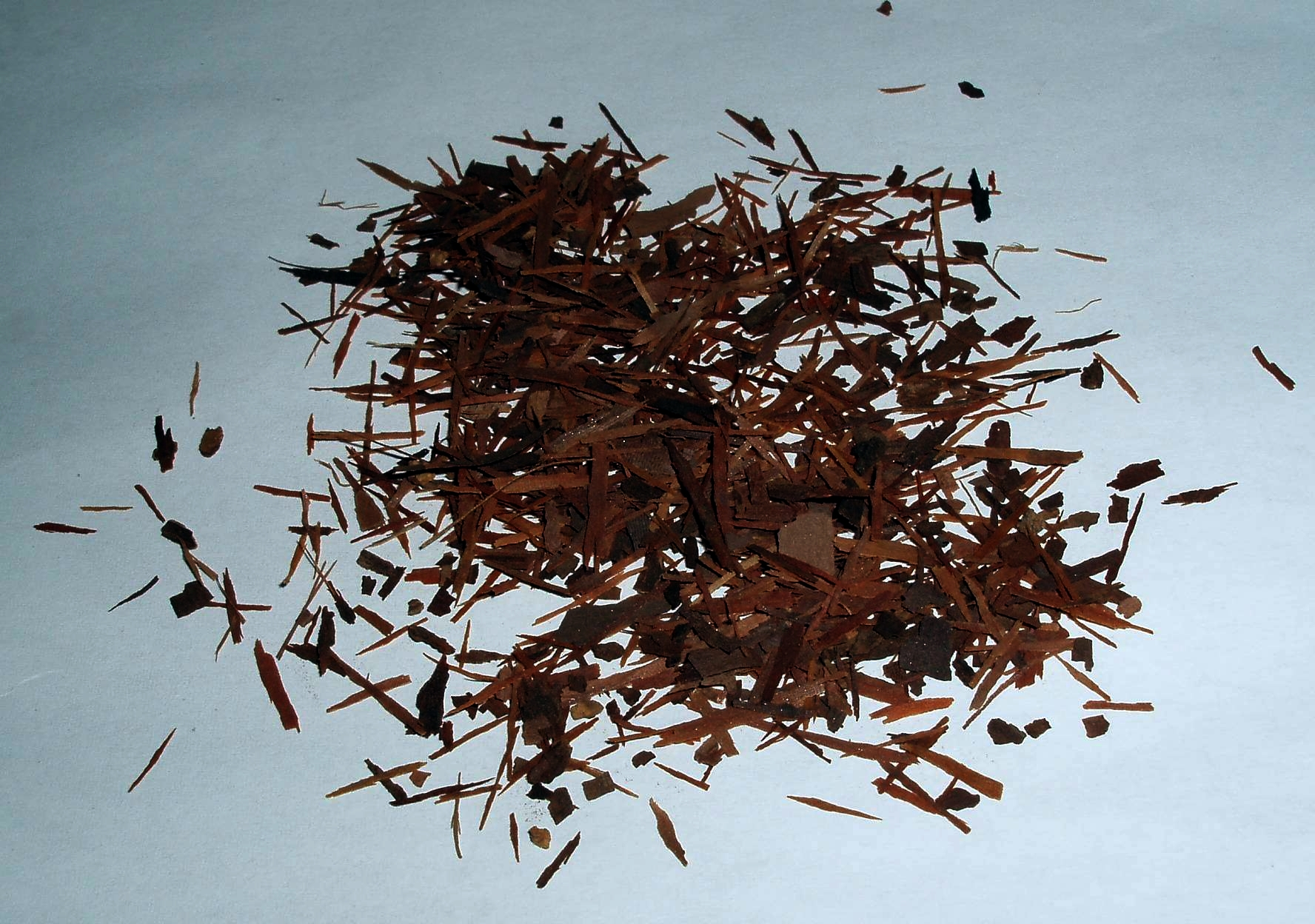
Lapacho tea

It is used as a honey plant, and widely planted as an ornamental tree in landscaping gardens, public squares and boulevards due to its impressive and colorful appearance as it flowers. Well-known and popular, it is the national tree of Paraguay. It is also planted as a street tree in cities of India, like in Bengaluru.

The inner bark is used in traditional medicine. It is dried, shredded, and then boiled, making a bitter brownish-colored tea known as lapacho or taheebo. The unpleasant taste of the extract is lessened when taken in pill form, or as tinctures. Lapacho bark is typically used during flu and cold season and for easing smoker's cough. It is claimed to work by promoting the lungs to expectorate and free deeply embedded mucus and contaminants during the first three to ten days of treatment.

In ethnomedicine, lapacho plays an important role for several South American indigenous people. In the past decades it has been used by herbalists as a general tonic, immunostimulant, and adaptogen. It is used in herbal medicine for intestinal candidiasis.

However, the main active compound lapachol has since turned out to be toxic enough to kill fetuses in pregnant rats and reduce the weight of the seminal vesicle in male rats in doses of 100 mg/kg of body weight. Still, lapachol has strong antibiotic and disinfectant properties, and may be better suited for topical applications. Lapachol induces genetic damage, specifically clastogenic effects, in rats. Beta-lapachone has a direct cytotoxic effect and the loss of telomerase activity in leukemia cells in vitro.

The ethnomedical use of lapacho and other Handroanthus teas is usually short-term, to get rid of acute ailments, and not as a general tonic. Usefulness as a short-term antimicrobial and disinfecting expectorant, e.g. against PCP in AIDS patients, is yet to be scientifically studied. Handroanthus impetiginosus inner bark seems to have anti-Helicobacter pylori activity. and has some effects on other human intestinal bacteria.

== Gallery ==
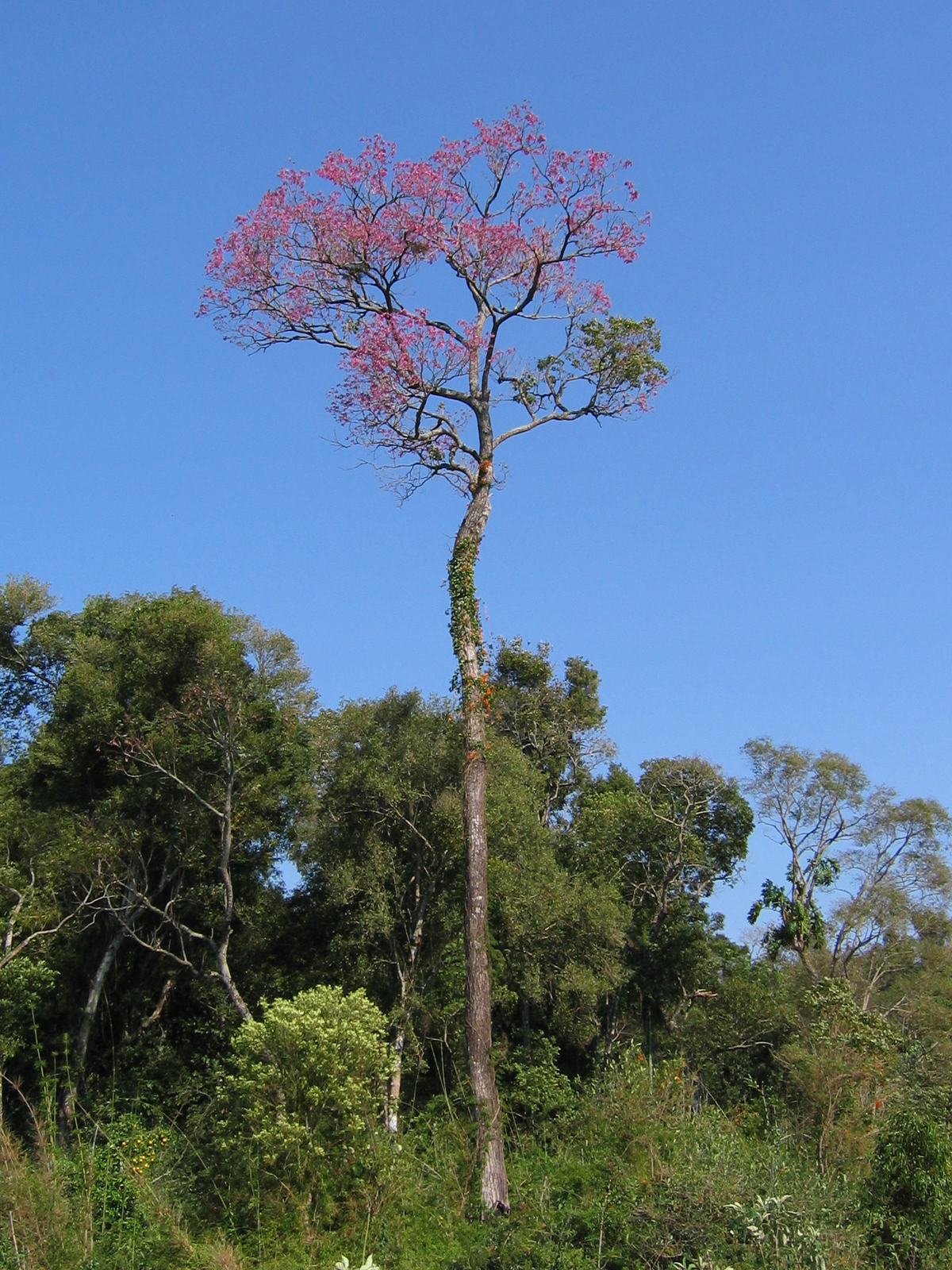
Lapacho in the wild

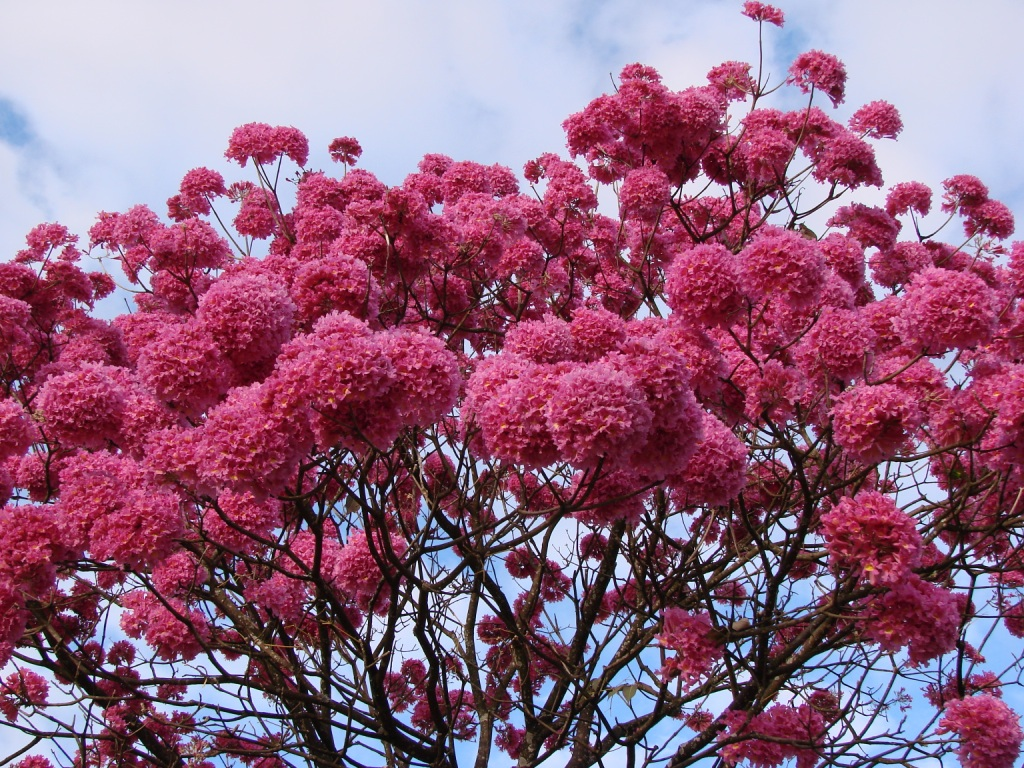
In Brasília

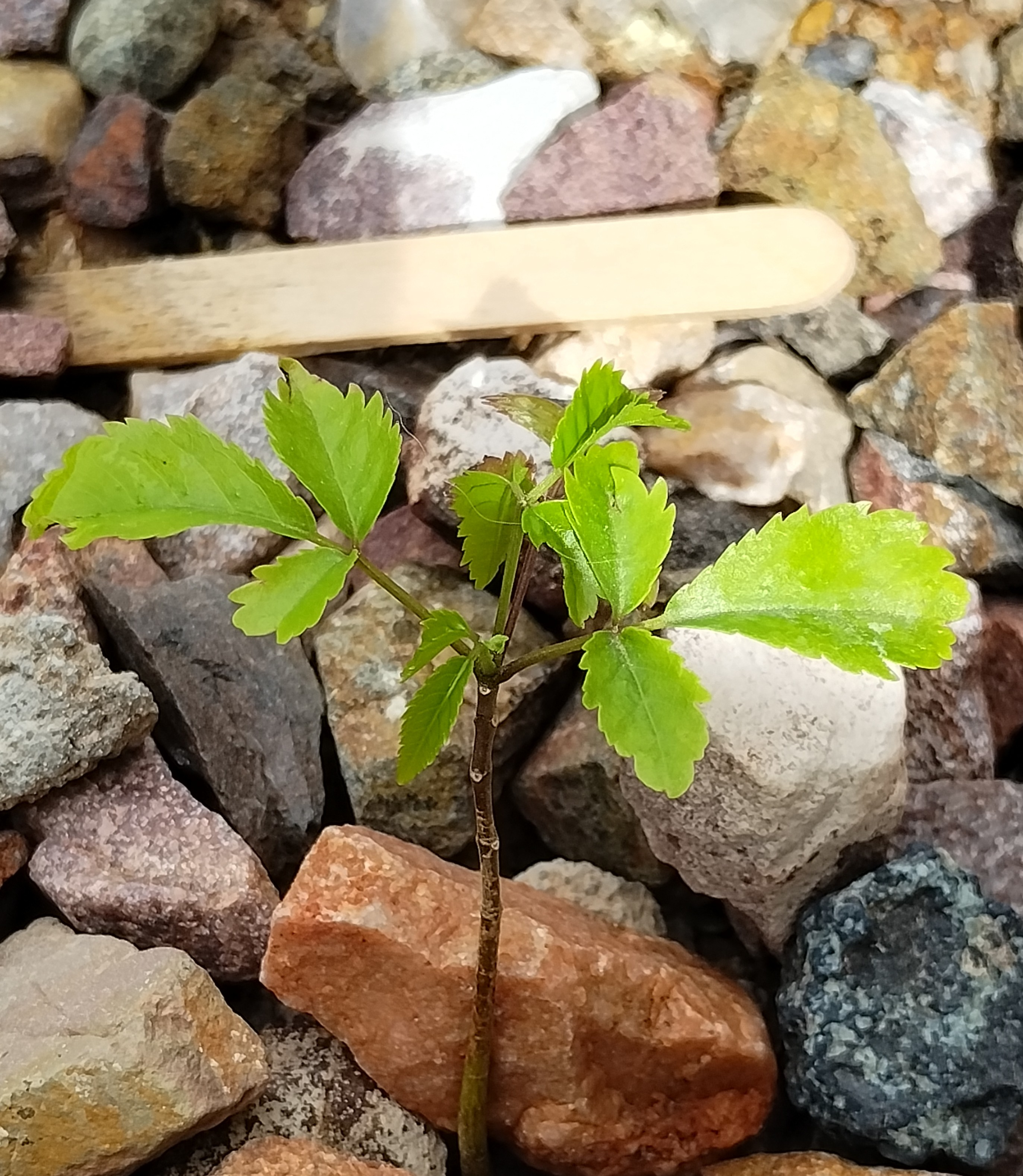
1-year old seedling

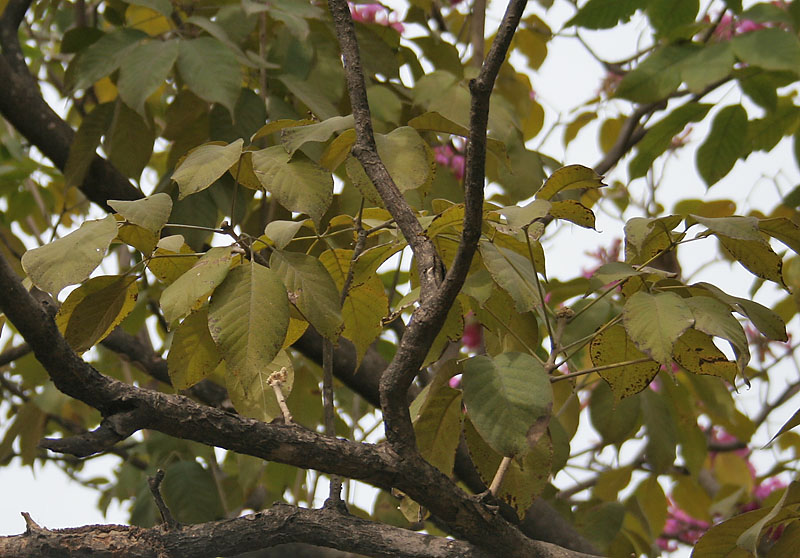
In Hyderabad, India

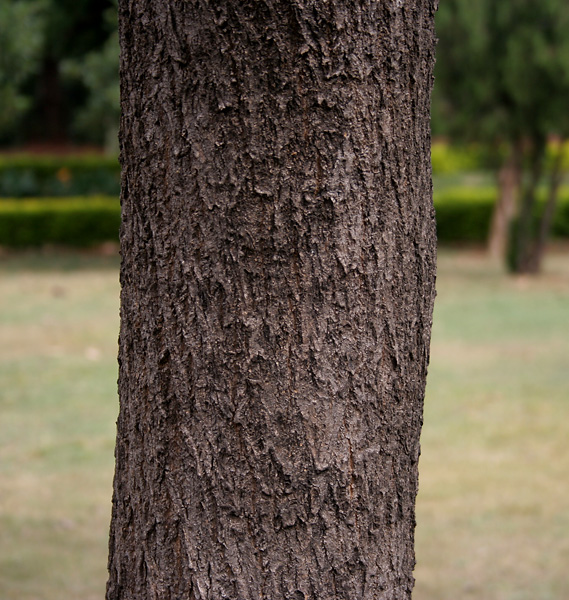
Trunk

At Disneyland

== See also ==
- Lapacho
