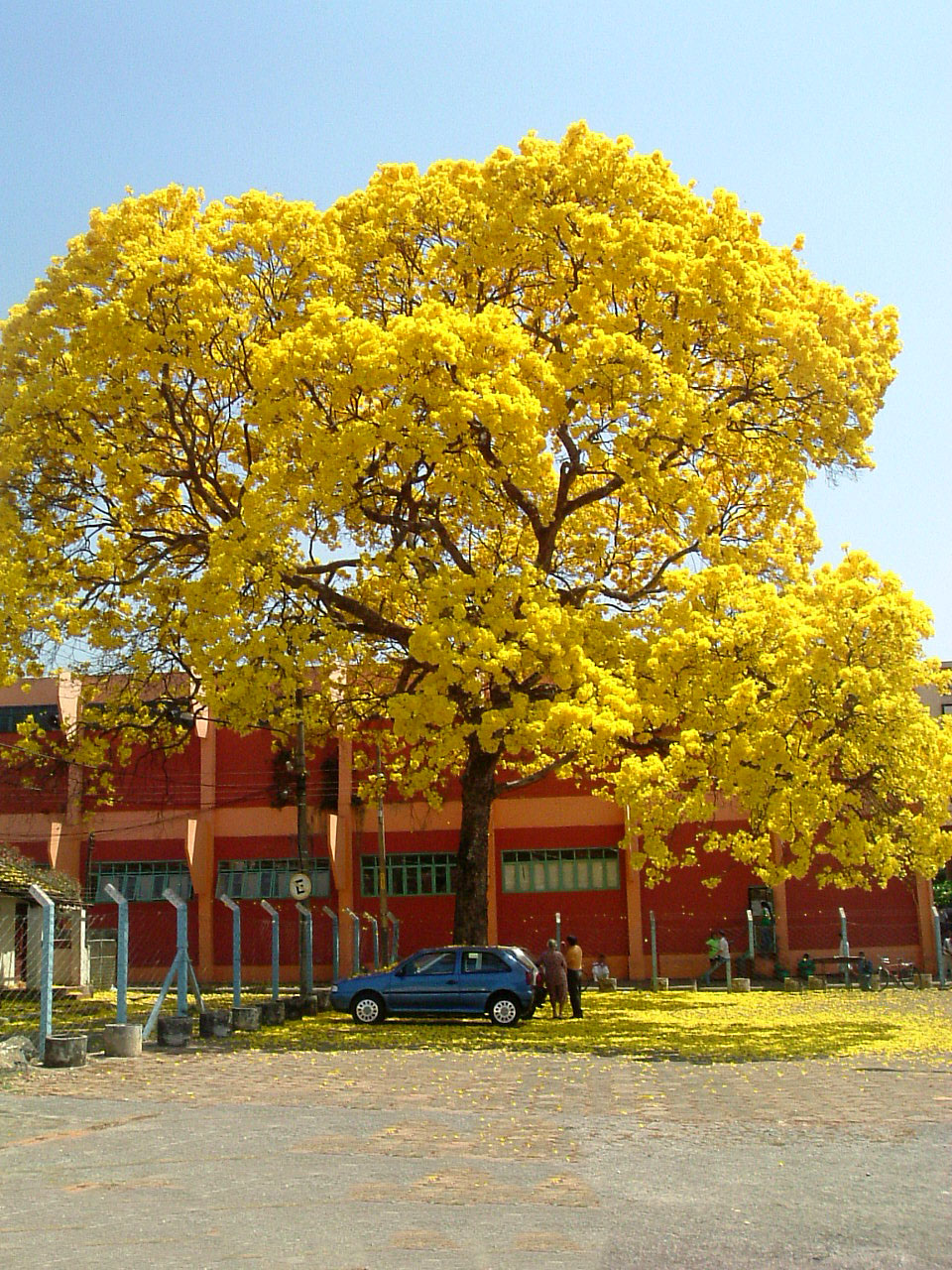

Scientific classification
- Kingdom: Plantae
- Clade: Tracheophytes
- Clade: Angiosperms
- Clade: Eudicots
- Clade: Asterids
- Order: Lamiales
- Family: Bignoniaceae
- Genus: Tabebuia
- Species: T. ochracea

Binomial name
- Tabebuia ochracea (Cham.) Standl.

Synonyms
- Tabebuia hypodidiction Tabebuia neochrysantha A.H.Gentry; Tecoma heterotricha DC. Tecoma ochracea Cham.

= Tabebuia ochracea =

Species of tree

Tabebuia ochracea, known as corteza amarilla in Spanish, is a timber tree native to South America, Cerrado and Pantanal vegetation in Brazil. It is also known as Handroanthus ochraceus or Tecoma ochracea. It is often confused with the Golden Trumpet Tree, which is known as Handroanthus chrysotrichus or Tabebuia chrysotricha. It is a seasonal flowering tree, blossoming only during spring (September). During this time, all leaves fall and only flowers remain in the crown.

There are three subspecies:

- Tabebuia ochracea ssp. heterotricha
- Tabebuia ochracea ssp. neochrysantha
- Tabebuia ochracea ssp. ochracea
