= Handroanthus lapacho =

Conservation status
- Near Threatened (IUCN 3.1)

Scientific classification
- Kingdom: Plantae
- Clade: Embryophytes
- Clade: Tracheophytes
- Clade: Angiosperms
- Clade: Eudicots
- Clade: Asterids
- Order: Lamiales
- Family: Bignoniaceae
- Genus: Handroanthus
- Species: H. lapacho

Binomial name
- Handroanthus lapacho (K.Schum.) S.O.Grose

Synonyms
- Tabebuia lapacho (K.Schum.) Sandwith; Tecoma lapacho K.Schum.

Species of tree

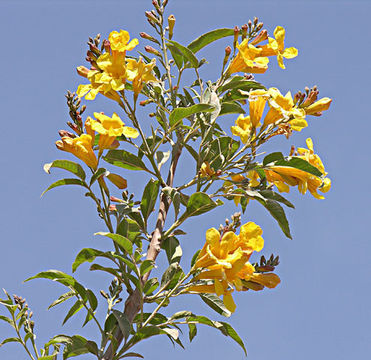

Handroanthus lapacho, is a Bignoniaceae tree native to Argentina (Jujuy, Salta) and Bolivia (Chuquisaca, Santa Cruz, Tarija).
