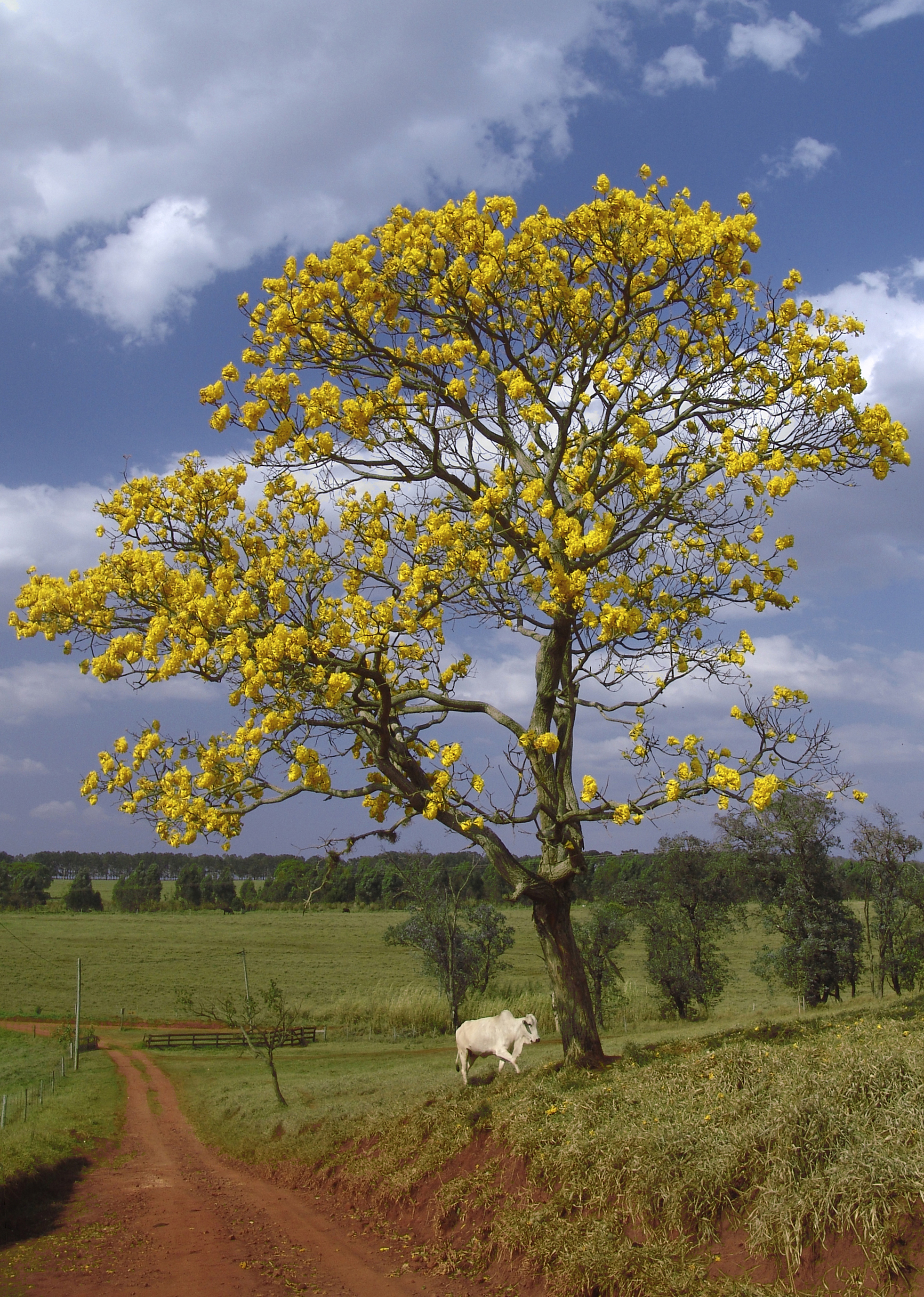

Scientific classification
- Kingdom: Plantae
- Clade: Tracheophytes
- Clade: Angiosperms
- Clade: Eudicots
- Clade: Asterids
- Order: Lamiales
- Family: Bignoniaceae
- Genus: Handroanthus
- Species: H. chrysotrichus

Binomial name
- Handroanthus chrysotrichus (Mart. ex DC.) Mattos

Synonyms
- Gelseminum chrysotrichum (Mart. ex A. DC.) Kuntze; Handroanthus chrysotrichus (Mart. ex A. DC.) Mattos; Handroanthus chrysotrichus var. obtusata (A. DC.) Mattos; Handroanthus pedicellatus (Bureau & K. Schum. ex Mart.) Mattos; Tabebuia chrysotricha var. obtusata (A. DC.) Toledo; Tabebuia flavescens Tabebuia pedicellata Tecoma chrysotricha Mart. ex A. DC.M; Tecoma chrysotricha var. obtusata (A. DC.) Bureau & K. Schum. ex Mart. Tecoma flavescens (Velloso) Mart. ex A. DC. Tecoma grandis F. Kränzl. Tecoma obtusata A. DC. Tecoma ochracea var. denudata Cham. Tecoma pedicellata Bureau & K. Schum. ex Mart.

= Handroanthus chrysotrichus =

Species of tree

Handroanthus chrysotrichus, synonym Tabebuia chrysotricha, commonly known as the golden trumpet tree, is a semi-evergreen/semi-deciduous (shedding foliage for a short period in late spring) tree from Brazil. It is very similar to and often confused with Tabebuia ochracea. In Portuguese it is called ipê amarelo and its flower is considered the national flower of Brazil.

== Growth ==
Handroanthus chrysotrichus grows to a height of 5 to 8 m (15 to 25 ft), sometimes up to 20 m (50 ft), with a spread of 8 to 11 m (25 to 35 ft). It has very showy golden-yellow to red flowers in the spring. These are rich in nectar and thus the tree is a useful honey plant. While it is not especially popular with hummingbirds, some of these – e.g. glittering-bellied emerald (Chlorostilbon lucidus) and white-throated hummingbird (Leucochloris albicollis) – seem to prefer them over the flowers of other Tabebuia species.

The golden trumpet tree is grown outside Brazil as a street tree and garden tree. The USDA rates it for hardiness zones 9b through 11, and moderately drought-tolerant.

Concern has been raised that it is becoming a weed in tropical and sub-tropical Australia, though it has not yet been declared.

== Taxonomy ==
A 2007 DNA study of various members classified in the genus Tabebuia showed that the taxon was polyphyletic, and two genera were resurrected to separate these members into three separate clades: Roseodendron, Handroanthus, and Tabebuia. Tabebuia chrysotricha was moved to Handroanthus chrysotrichus, characterized by the hardness of its wood and high lapachol content.

== Gallery ==
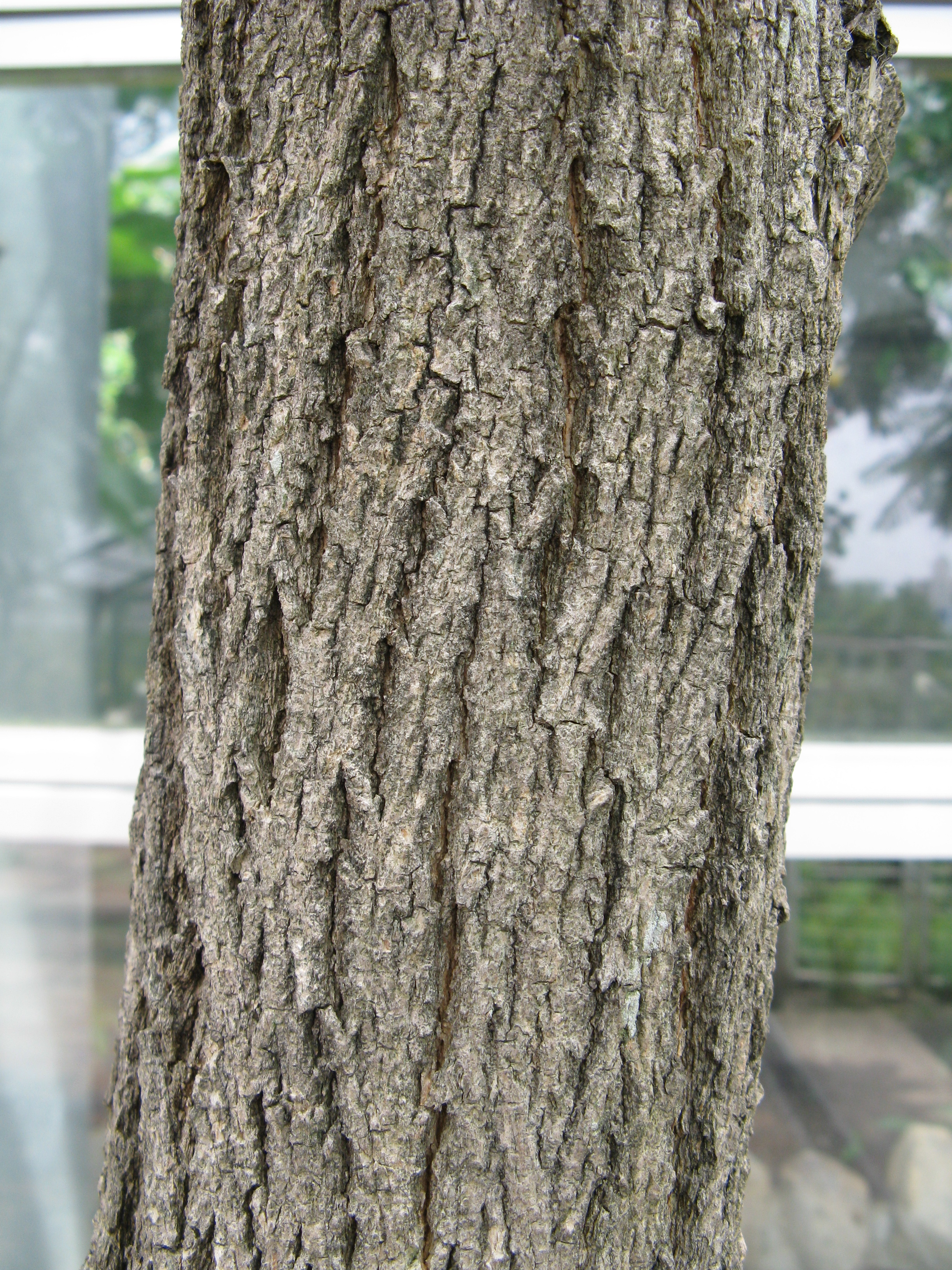
Trunk

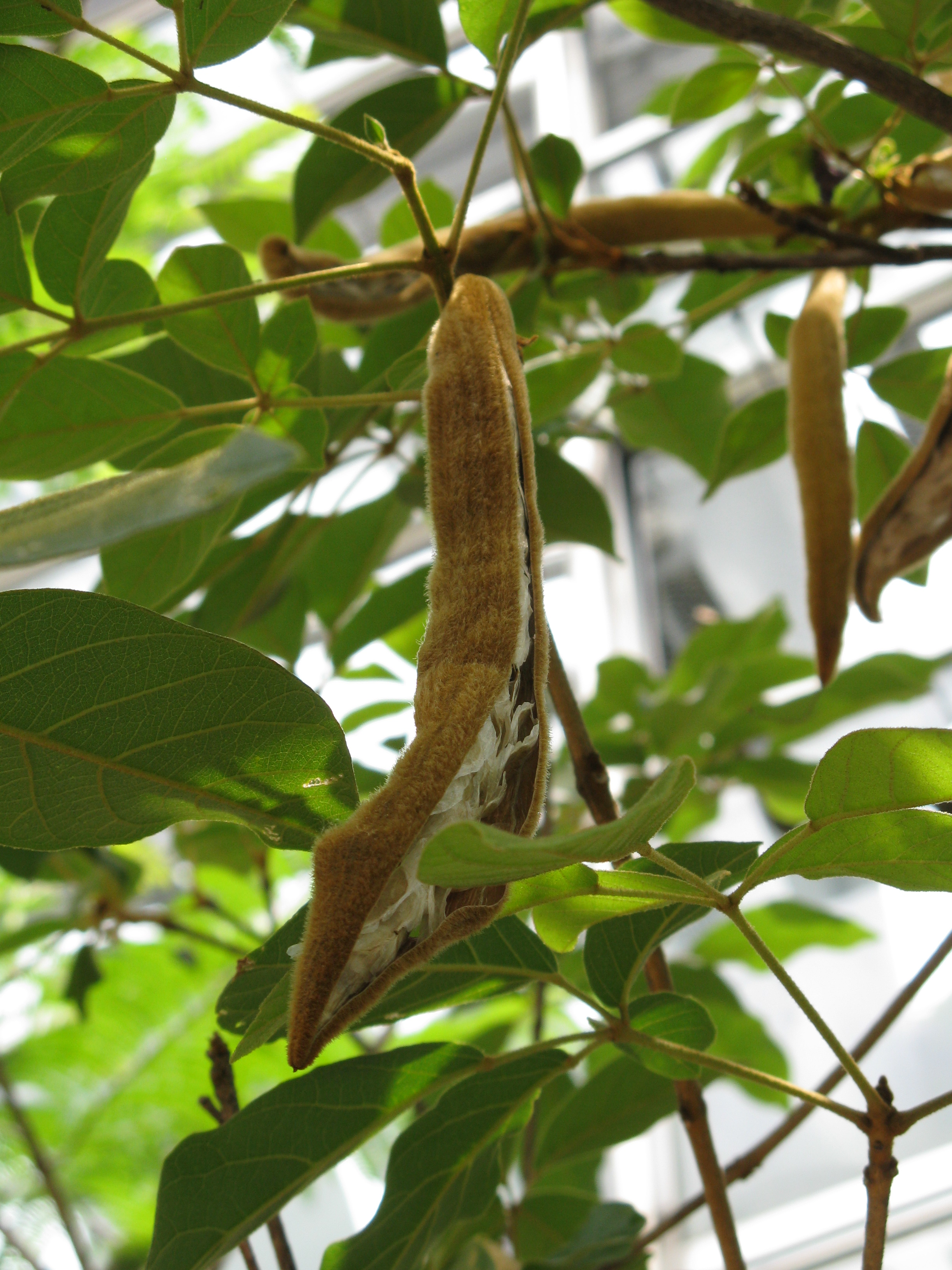
Fruit

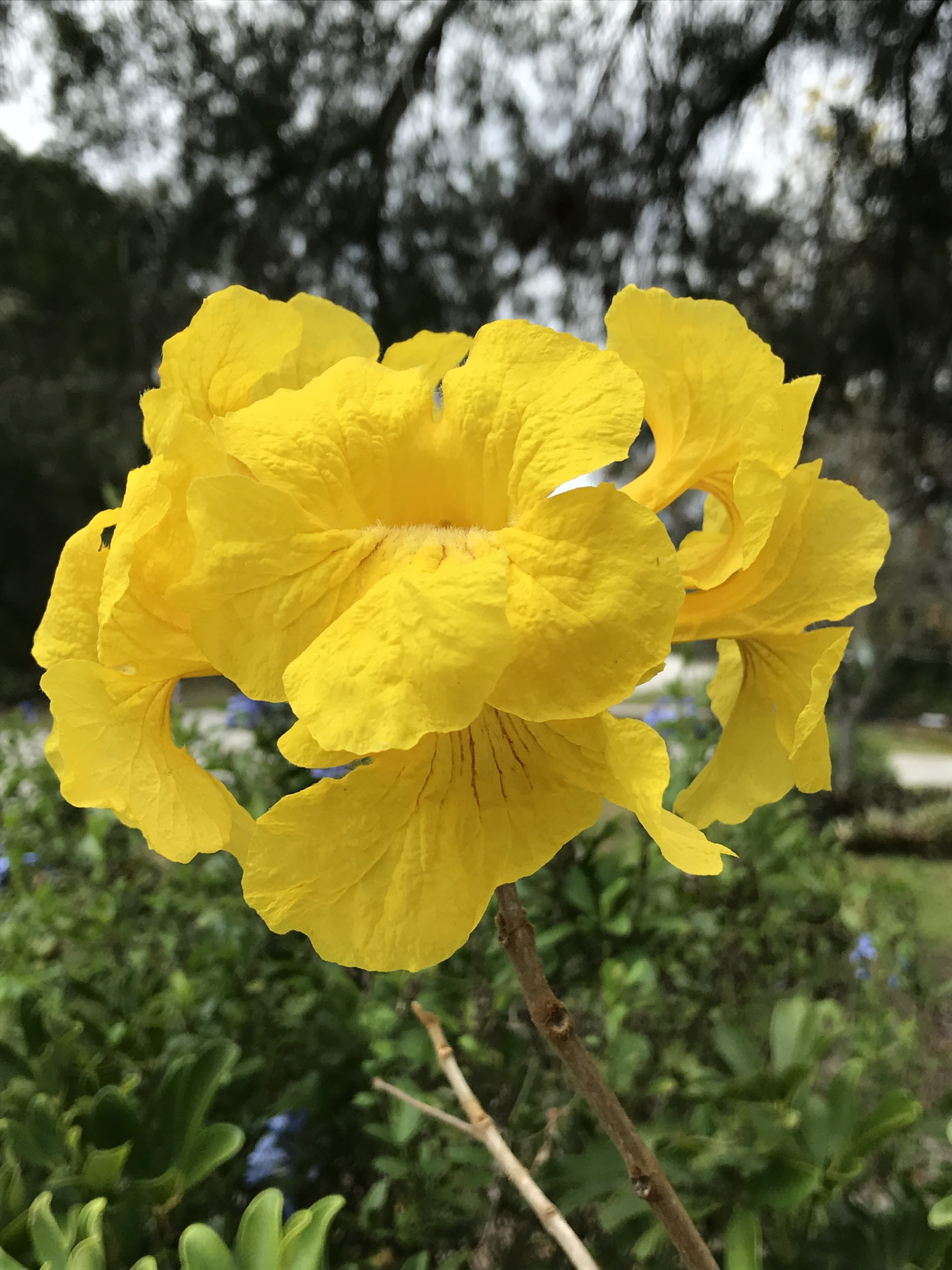
Flowers
