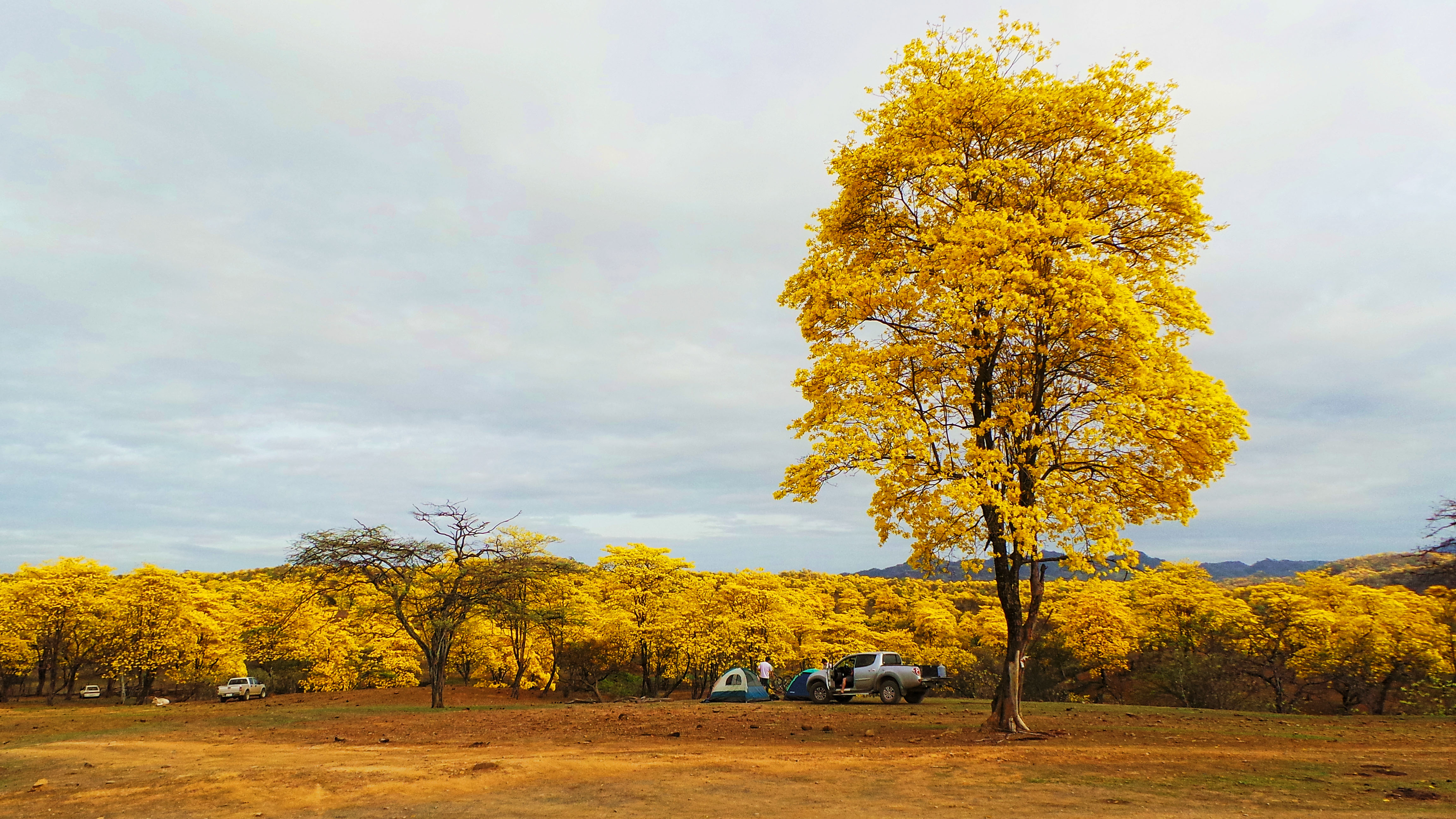

Scientific classification
- Kingdom: Plantae
- Clade: Tracheophytes
- Clade: Angiosperms
- Clade: Eudicots
- Clade: Asterids
- Order: Lamiales
- Family: Bignoniaceae
- Genus: Handroanthus
- Species: H. guayacan

Binomial name
- Handroanthus guayacan (Seem.) S.O.Grose

Synonyms
- Tabebuia guayacan (Seem.) Hemsl.; Tecoma guayacan Seem.

= Handroanthus guayacan =

Species of tree

Handroanthus guayacan, is a Bignoniaceae tree native to South America and the Mexican states of Campeche, Chiapas, Oaxaca, Quintana Roo, Tabasco, and Veracruz.
