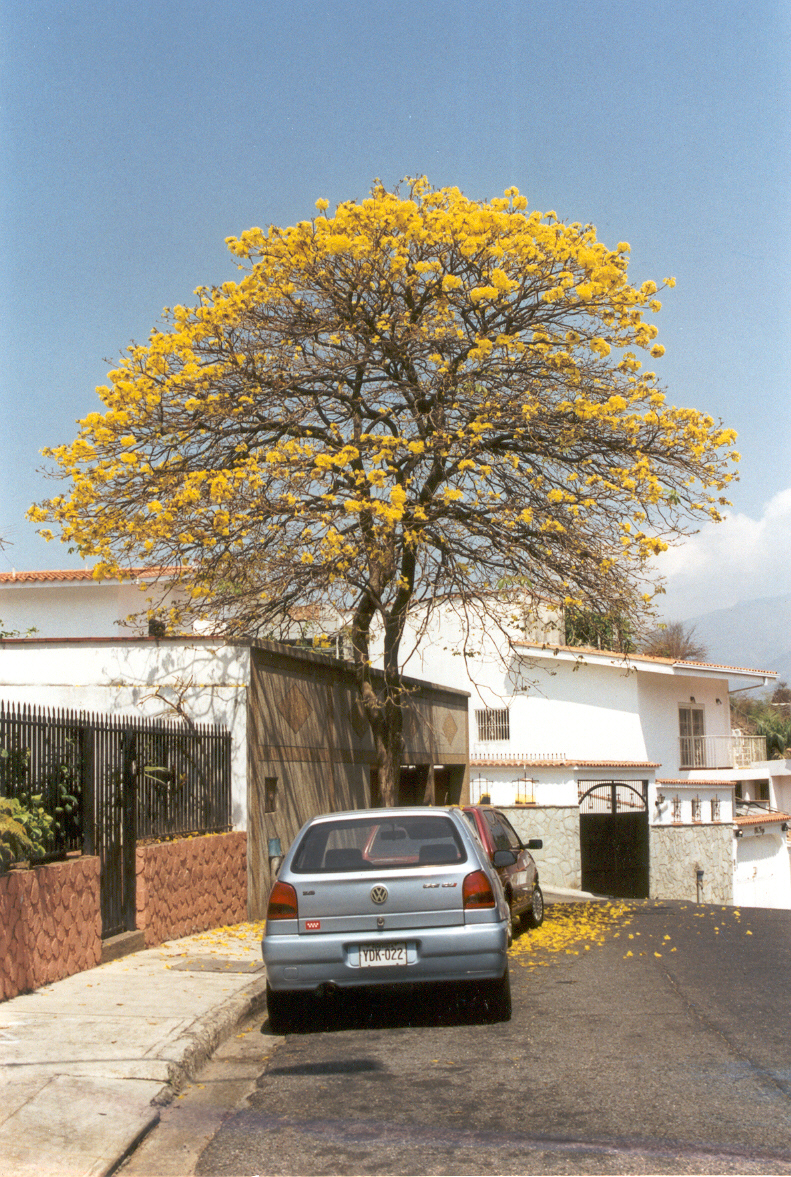
- Flowering Handroanthus chrysanthus in a street of Caracas.

Scientific classification
- Kingdom: Plantae
- Clade: Embryophytes
- Clade: Tracheophytes
- Clade: Spermatophytes
- Clade: Angiosperms
- Clade: Eudicots
- Clade: Asterids
- Order: Lamiales
- Family: Bignoniaceae
- Genus: Handroanthus
- Species: H. chrysanthus

Binomial name
- Handroanthus chrysanthus (Jacq.) S.O.Grose

Synonyms
- Bignonia chrysantha; Tabebuia chrysantha; Tecoma chrysantha

= Handroanthus chrysanthus =

Species of tree

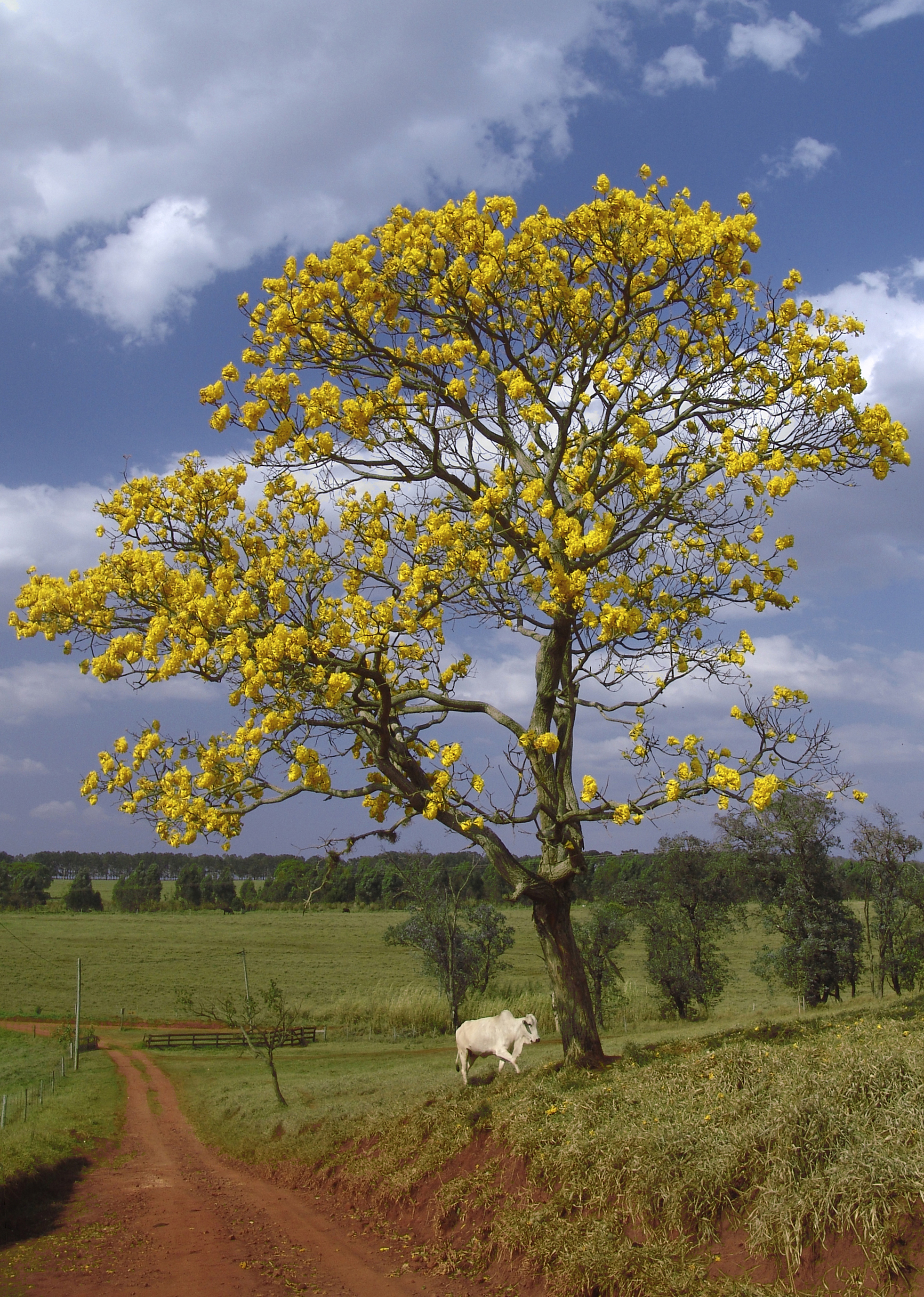
Handroanthus chrysotrichus, a similar species in Brazil.

Handroanthus chrysanthus (araguaney or yellow ipê), formerly classified as Tabebuia chrysantha, also known as araguaney in Venezuela, as guayacán in Colombia, Ecuador and Panama, as chonta quiru in Peru, as tajibo in Bolivia, and as ipê-amarelo in Brazil, is a native tree of the intertropical broadleaf deciduous forests of South America above the Tropic of Capricorn. On May 29, 1948, Handroanthus chrysanthus was declared the National Tree of Venezuela due to its status as an emblematic native species of extraordinary beauty. Its deep yellow resembles that of the Venezuelan flag.

== Etymology ==
Chrysantha is derived from two Greek words, χρῡσ-ός 'gold' + ἄνθεμον 'flower'. The name araguaney appears to derive from arawone, the name used by the Kalina people (Caribs) for this tree.

== Habitat ==
The araguaney is found in clearings of deciduous tropical forests of the broad Guiana Shield region. It is also native to warm lands and savanna (Vía Oriente to El Guapo, Cupira, and Uchire Sabana) and even some arid hills (Mampote, Guarenas, Guatire and Caucagua). Its habitat ranges 400 to 1700 m above sea level.

== Description ==
It is a rustic deciduous tree that grows in hard, dry or poor soils. Therefore, its roots require well-drained terrain. Its height ranges from 6 to 12 m. Leaves are opposite and petiolate; they have an elliptic and lanceolate shape and pinnate venation. Flowers are large and tubular, with a broadening corolla of deep yellow colour, about 2 inches long; the tree flowers from February to April, before the tree has grown back any leaves. The fruit consists of dehiscent capsule that typically matures by the end of dry season. It is a slow-growing but long-lasting tree.

Flowering and fruiting take place in the dry season, from February to April, so that the seeds can take advantage of early rains. If the raining season is delayed, the araguaney may flower and fruit, mildly, a second time. It is a highly efficient moisture manager. Similar to mango trees, the araguaney requires the most water during the dry season.
