= List of national trees =

This is a list of countries that have officially designated one or more trees as their national trees. Most species in the list are officially designated. Some species hold only an "unofficial" status. Additionally, the list includes trees that were once official but are no longer, as well as trees recognized as national symbols or for other symbolic roles.

== National trees ==
Country	Common name	Scientific name	Picture	Source
Afghanistan	Afghan pine	Pinus brutia ssp. eldarica		
Albania	Olive	Olea europaea		
Antigua and Barbuda	Whitewood	Bucida buceras		
Angola	Baobab	Adansonia digitata		
Argentina	Ceibo	Erythrina crista-galli		
Argentina	Red quebracho	Schinopsis balansae		
Australia	Golden wattle	Acacia pycnantha		
Bahamas	Lignum Vitae	Guaiacum sanctum		
Bangladesh	Mango tree (Aam Gaachh)	Mangifera indica		
Belarus	Oak, Pedunculate oak (unofficial)	Quercus, Quercus robur		
Belize	Honduras mahogany	Swietenia macrophylla		
Bhutan	Bhutan cypress	Cupressus cashmeriana		
Brazil	Brazilwood	Paubrasilia echinata		
Cambodia	Palmyra palm	Borassus flabellifer		
Canada	Maple	Acer		
Chile	Araucaria	Araucaria araucana		
China	Ginkgo	Ginkgo biloba		
Colombia	Quindio wax palm	Ceroxylon quindiuense		
Costa Rica	Guanacaste	Enterolobium cyclocarpum		
Croatia	Oak, Pedunculate oak	Quercus, Quercus robur		
Cuba	Cuban royal palm	Roystonea regia		
Cyprus	Golden oak	Quercus alnifolia		
Czech Republic	Small-leaved lime/Small-leaved linden	Tilia cordata		
Denmark	European beech	Fagus sylvatica		
Denmark	Oak, Pedunculate oak	Quercus, Quercus robur		
Dominican Republic	West Indian mahogany	Swietenia mahagoni		
Ecuador	Cinchona pubescens	Cinchona pubescens		
El Salvador	Maquilishuat	Tabebuia rosea		
Estonia	Oak, Pedunculate oak	Quercus, Quercus robur		
Finland	Silver birch	Betula pendula		
Germany	Oak, Pedunculate oak	Quercus, Quercus robur		
Greece	Olive	Olea europaea		
Guatemala	Ceiba	Ceiba pentandra		
Haiti	Royal palm	Roystonea		
Hungary	Elm (unofficial)	Ulmus		
Honduras	Ocote	Pinus oocarpa		
India	Indian banyan	Ficus benghalensis		
Indonesia	Teak	Tectona		
Ireland	Sessile oak	Quercus petraea		
Iran	Mediterranean cypress	Cupressus sempervirens		
Israel	Olive	Olea europaea		
Italy	Strawberry tree (unofficial)	Arbutus unedo		
Jamaica	Blue mahoe	Hibiscus elatus		
Japan	Japanese cherry blossom	Prunus serrulata		
Laos	Frangipani	Plumeria		
Latvia	Oak, Pedunculate oak	Quercus, Quercus robur		
Latvia	Linden	Tilia cordata		
Lebanon	Lebanon cedar	Cedrus libani		
Lithuania	Oak, Pedunculate oak	Quercus, Quercus robur		
Macedonia	Macedonian pine (unofficial)	Pinus peuce		
Madagascar	Baobab	Adansonia		
Malaysia	Borneo/Malacca teak, Merbau	Intsia palembanica		
Maldives	Coconut palm	Cocos nucifera		
Malta	Għargħar	Tetraclinis articulata		
Mexico	Ahuehuete	Taxodium mucronatum		
Moldova	Oak, Pedunculate oak	Quercus, Quercus robur		
Nepal	Rhododendron	Rhododendron		
New Zealand	Silver fern	Cyathea dealbata		
Nicaragua	Lemonwood	Calycophyllum candidissimum		
North Korea	Pine	Pinus		
Pakistan	Deodar	Cedrus deodara		
Palestine	Olive	Olea europaea		
Panama	Panama tree	Sterculia apetala		
Paraguay	Lapacho	Handroanthus (whole genus)		
Peru	Cinchona officinalis	Cinchona		
Philippines	Narra	Pterocarpus indicus		
Poland	Oak, Pedunculate oak	Quercus, Quercus robur		
Portugal	Cork oak	Quercus suber		
Qatar	Christ's thorn jujube	Ziziphus spina-christi		
Romania	Oak, Pedunculate oak	Quercus, Quercus robur		
Russia	Siberian larch	Larix sibirica		
Saudi Arabia	Phoenix palm	Phoenix dactylifera		
Senegal	Baobab	Adansonia digitata		
Serbia	Oak, Pedunculate oak	Quercus, Quercus robur		
Serbia	Serbian spruce	Picea omorika		
Slovakia	Small-leaved lime/Small-leaved linden	Tilia cordata		
Slovenia	Tilia (Linden)	Tilia		
Spain	Ballota oak	Quercus rotundifolia		
South Africa	Real yellowwood	Podocarpus latifolius		
South Korea	Rose of Sharon, Korean red pine	Hibiscus syriacus, Pinus densiflora		
Sri Lanka	Sri Lankan ironwood	Mesua nagassarium		
Sweden	Ornäs birch	Betula pendula 'Dalecarlica'		
Tanzania	African blackwood	Dalbergia melanoxylon		
Thailand	Ratchaphruek	Cassia fistula		
Ukraine	Viburnum, Willow	Viburnum, Salix		
United Arab Emirates	Ghaf tree	Prosopis cineraria		
United Kingdom	Oak, Pedunculate oak	Quercus, Quercus robur		
United States	Oak	Quercus		
Uruguay	Ceibo	Erythrina crista-galli		
Venezuela	Araguaney	Tabebuia chrysantha		
Yemen	Dragon blood tree	Dracaena cinnabari		

== See also ==
- National emblem
- Floral emblem
- List of U.S. State and territory trees
