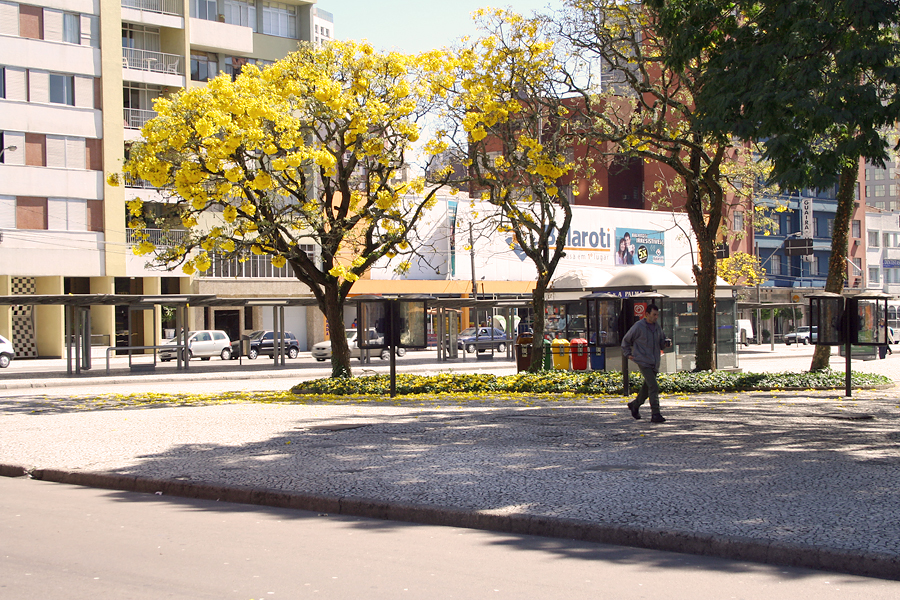

Scientific classification
- Kingdom: Plantae
- Clade: Tracheophytes
- Clade: Angiosperms
- Clade: Eudicots
- Clade: Asterids
- Order: Lamiales
- Family: Bignoniaceae
- Genus: Handroanthus
- Species: H. albus

Binomial name
- Handroanthus albus (Cham.) Mattos

Synonyms
- Tabebuia alba (Cham.) Sandwith; Tecoma alba Cham.

= Handroanthus albus =

Species of tree

Handroanthus albus, the golden trumpet tree, is a tree with yellow flowers native to Argentina, Paraguay, Bolivia and the Cerrado (tropical savannas) of Brazil, where it is known as ipê-amarelo-da-serra.

This plant is found in the Brazilian states of Distrito Federal, where it's the states symbol, Bahia, Espírito Santo, Goiás, Mato Grosso do Sul, Minas Gerais, Paraná, Rio de Janeiro, Rio Grande do Sul, Santa Catarina, Piauí, Amazonas, Pará and São Paulo.

It is used as an urban tree. Well-known and popular, the tree and its flower are the national plants of Brazil.
