= Lapacho =

Herbal tea made from pau d'arco tree bark

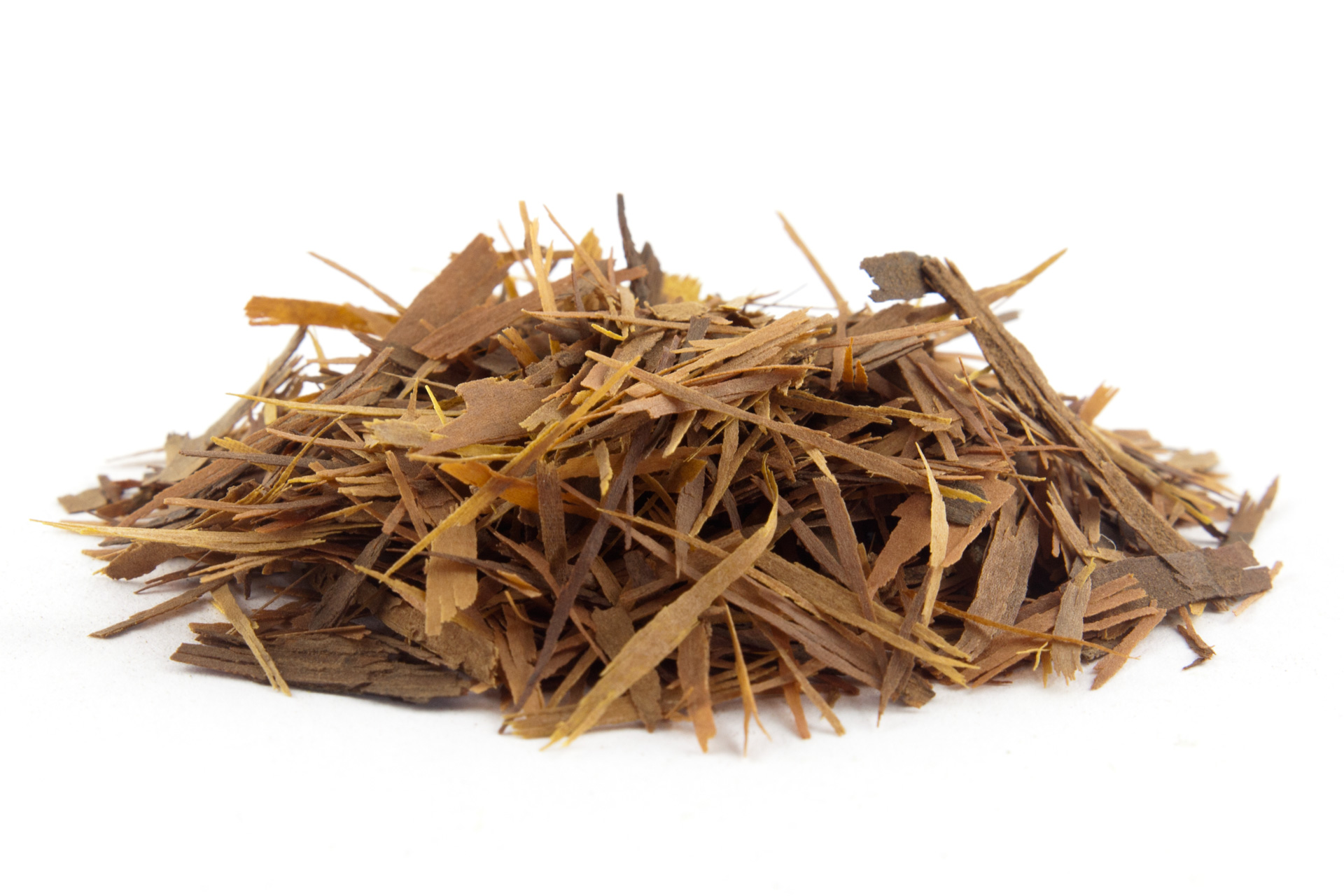
Lapacho

Lapacho or taheebo is herbal tea made from the inner bark of the pau d'arco tree Handroanthus impetiginosus.

Lapacho is used in the herbal medicine of several South and Central American indigenous peoples to treat a number of ailments including infection, fever and stomach complaints. The active ingredients such as lapachol have been found to possess significant abortifacient and reproductive toxicity effects for rats.

Taheebo is the common name for the inner bark of the red or purple lapacho tree. This tree grows high in the Andes of the South American rainforest. The red lapacho's purple-colored inner bark was one of the main medicines used by the Incas and has been used for over 1,000 years by the Kallawaya.

Lapacho is traditionally promoted by herbalists as a treatment for a number of human ailments, including cancer. According to the American Cancer Society, "available evidence from well-designed, controlled studies does not support this substance as an effective treatment for cancer in humans", and using it risks harmful side-effects.

== See also ==
- List of ineffective cancer treatments
