= Lapachol =

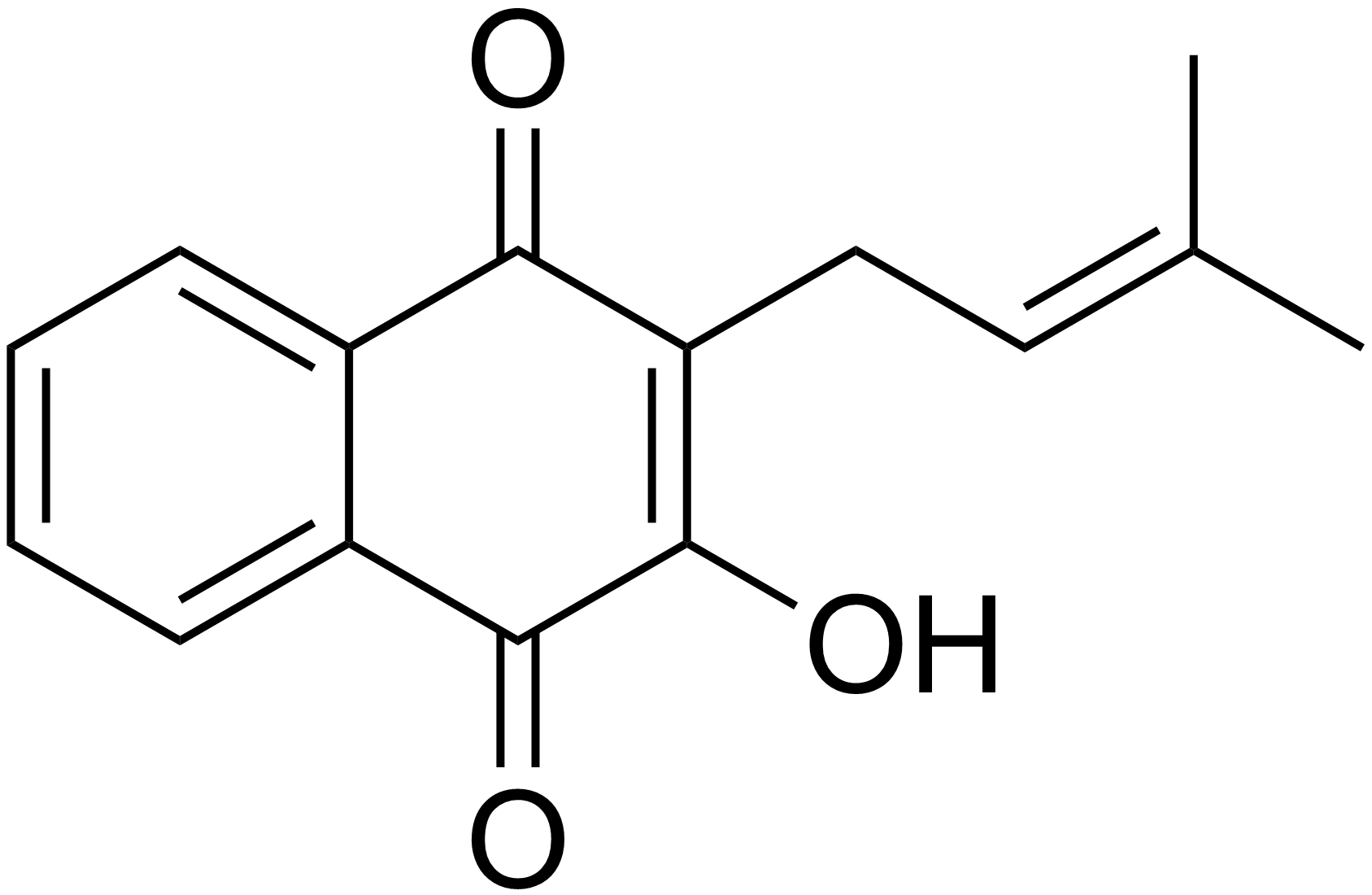

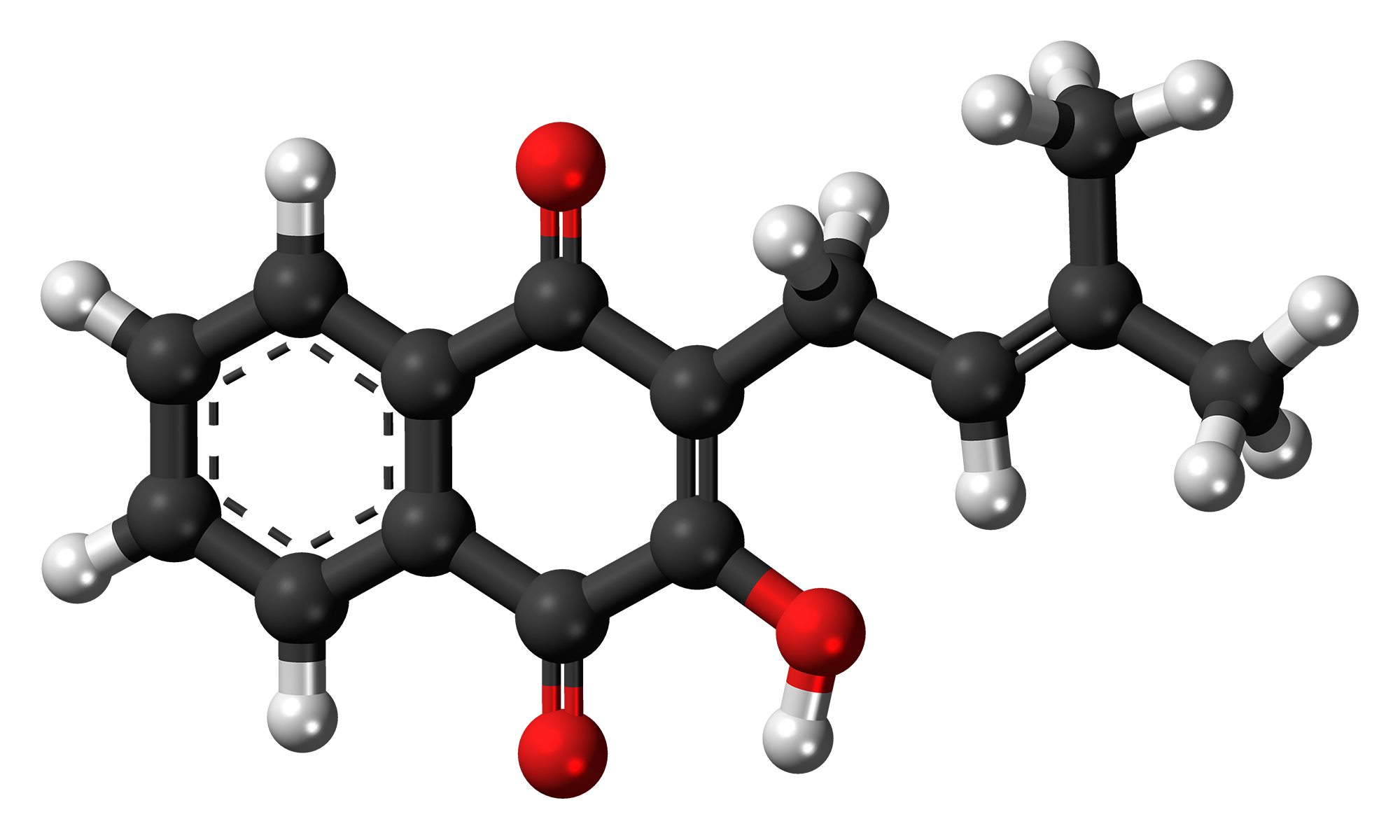

Names
- Preferred IUPAC name 2-Hydroxy-3-(3-methylbut-2-en-1-yl)naphthalene-1,4-dione

Identifiers
CAS Number	84-79-7
3D model (JSmol)	Interactive image
ChEBI	CHEBI:6377
ChEMBL	ChEMBL15193
ChemSpider	10770962
ECHA InfoCard	100.001.421
EC Number	201-563-7
PubChem CID	3884
UNII	B221938VB6
CompTox Dashboard (EPA)	DTXSID6049430
- InChI: InChI=1S/C15H14O3/c1-9(2)7-8-12-13(16)10-5-3-4-6-11(10)14(17)15(12)18/h3-7,18H,8H2,1-2H3 Key: CIEYTVIYYGTCCI-UHFFFAOYSA-N; InChI=1/C15H14O3/c1-9(2)7-8-12-13(16)10-5-3-4-6-11(10)14(17)15(12)18/h3-7,18H,8H2,1-2H3 Key: CIEYTVIYYGTCCI-UHFFFAOYAS
- SMILES: CC(=CCC1=C(C2=CC=CC=C2C(=O)C1=O)O)C

Properties
Chemical formula	C_{15}H_{14}O_{3}
Molar mass	242.27
Appearance	Yellow crystals
Melting point	140 °C (284 °F; 413 K)
- Except where otherwise noted, data are given for materials in their standard state (at 25 °C [77 °F], 100 kPa). verify (what is ?) Infobox references

Lapachol is a natural phenolic compound isolated from the bark of the lapacho tree. This tree is known botanically as Handroanthus impetiginosus, but was formerly known by various other botanical names such as Tabebuia avellanedae. Lapachol is also found in other species of Handroanthus.

Lapachol is usually encountered as a yellow, skin-irritating powder from wood. Chemically, it is a derivative of vitamin K.

Once studied as a possible treatment for some types of cancer, the levels of lapachol required for cancer treatment are considered too toxic for use as an in vivo chemotherapy treatment.

In 2024, A clinical trial published in the Journal of Cosmetic Dermatology determined that lower concentrations of lapachol were safe and efficacious in Facial Redness Reduction.

== See also ==
Hooker reaction
