= Moldenke =

Moldenke is a surname. Notable people with the surname include:

- Charles Edward Moldenke (1860–1935), American Egyptologist
- Edward Frederick Moldenke (1836–1904), Lutheran theologian and missionary of Germany and the U.S.
- Harold Norman Moldenke (1909–1996), American botanist and taxonomist
