= Aegiphila aculeifera =

Scientific classification
- Kingdom: Plantae
- Clade: Tracheophytes
- Clade: Angiosperms
- Clade: Eudicots
- Clade: Asterids
- Order: Lamiales
- Family: Lamiaceae
- Genus: Aegiphila
- Species: A. aculeifera

Binomial name
- Aegiphila aculeifera Moldenke

Species of flowering plant

Aegiphila aculeifera is a species of flowering plant in the family Lamiaceae. It is native to Colombia.
