= Aegiphila rimbachii =

Conservation status
- Endangered (IUCN 3.1)

Scientific classification
- Kingdom: Plantae
- Clade: Tracheophytes
- Clade: Angiosperms
- Clade: Eudicots
- Clade: Asterids
- Order: Lamiales
- Family: Lamiaceae
- Genus: Aegiphila
- Species: A. rimbachii

Binomial name
- Aegiphila rimbachii Moldenke

Species of flowering plant

Aegiphila rimbachii is a species of tree in the family Lamiaceae. It is endemic to Bolívar Province in Ecuador, where it grows in the cloud forests of the Andes.
