= Aegiphila fasciculata =

Conservation status
- Vulnerable (IUCN 3.1)

Scientific classification
- Kingdom: Plantae
- Clade: Tracheophytes
- Clade: Angiosperms
- Clade: Eudicots
- Clade: Asterids
- Order: Lamiales
- Family: Lamiaceae
- Genus: Aegiphila
- Species: A. fasciculata

Binomial name
- Aegiphila fasciculata Donn.Sm.

Species of tree

Aegiphila fasciculata is a species of tree in the family Lamiaceae. It is native to Central America, where it occurs in Guatemala, Honduras, and Nicaragua, and the state of Chiapas in southern Mexico. It grows in lowland tropical moist forest.

The species was described by John Donnell Smith in 1914.
