= Aegiphila skutchii =

Conservation status
- Vulnerable (IUCN 3.1)

Scientific classification
- Kingdom: Plantae
- Clade: Tracheophytes
- Clade: Angiosperms
- Clade: Eudicots
- Clade: Asterids
- Order: Lamiales
- Family: Lamiaceae
- Genus: Aegiphila
- Species: A. skutchii

Binomial name
- Aegiphila skutchii Moldenke

Species of flowering plant

Aegiphila skutchii is a species of flowering plant in the family Lamiaceae. It is native to Guatemala, Honduras, southern Mexico, and Nicaragua. It grows in montane tropical moist forest, cloud forest, and secondary vegetation from 730 to 2,000 metres elevation.
