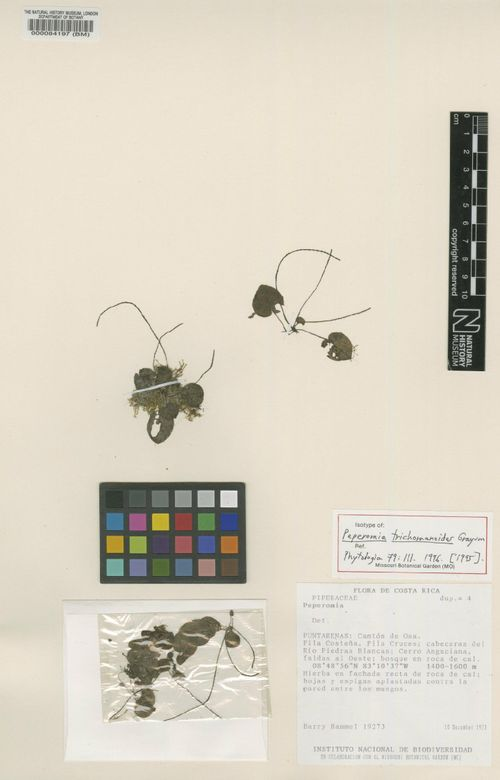

Scientific classification
- Kingdom: Plantae
- Clade: Tracheophytes
- Clade: Angiosperms
- Clade: Magnoliids
- Order: Piperales
- Family: Piperaceae
- Genus: Peperomia
- Species: P. trichomanoides

Binomial name
- Peperomia trichomanoides Grayum

= Peperomia trichomanoides =

Species of lithophyte

Peperomia trichomanoides is a species of lithophyte in the genus Peperomia. It primarily grows on wet tropical biomes. Its Conservation Status is Threatened.

== Description ==
The species is known only from the type locality, at 1,400-1,600 metres elevation on the steep limestone ramparts of Cerro Anguciana.

Plants that were epilithic had flattened leaves and spikes against the rock. Short, thick, subcormose stems measuring 0.2–0.8 x 0.15-0.25 centimetres. In the basal rosette, leaves appear to alternate. Petioles are 0.3-1.9 centimetres long and spreading-hirsute, with uniseriate hairs. The blade of a leaf are 0.5-1.8 x 0.5-1.8 centimetres; broadly ovate to suborbicular or subreniform; impeltate or hardly rounded to subtruncate; broadly rounded to moderately acute apically; palmate: 3-5 nerved; appressed-hirsute on both sides (more sparsely so above); pellucid-gland dotted at least above. single, basal inflorescences. Peduncles are purbes as petioles, measuring 1.3–4.1 centimetres. The An unbranched, indeterminate inflorescence: beakless, elliptical to wikt:subglobose, constricted to substipitate base, 2.7–7 centimetres x 0.3–0.4 millimetres; stigma apical.

The plants in this species bear a resemblance to miniature variants of P. saintpauliella, from which they differ in having proportionately longer peduncles and highly pubescent inflorescences rachises, in addition to their generally reduced size. This species is similar to some specimens of P. tuerckheimii (including P. hispidorhachis), a small calciphile that also occurs in the same area. P. tuerckheimii, however, has more elongate, peltate, non-cordate leaf blades with usually seven primary basal veins instead of five.

== Taxonomy and naming ==
It was described in 1996 by Michael Howard Grayum in "Phytologia.", from collected specimens by Barry Edward Hammel in 1993. It gets its name from its habitat (epilithic and growing among mosses), appressed behaviour, and diminutive size, which are reminiscent of several "Trichomanes" fern species.

== Distribution and habitat ==
It is endemic to Costa Rica. It grows on epilithic environment and grows with mosses.
