= Aegiphila sordida =

Conservation status
- Least Concern (IUCN 2.3)

Scientific classification
- Kingdom: Plantae
- Clade: Tracheophytes
- Clade: Angiosperms
- Clade: Eudicots
- Clade: Asterids
- Order: Lamiales
- Family: Lamiaceae
- Genus: Aegiphila
- Species: A. sordida

Binomial name
- Aegiphila sordida Moldenke

Species of plant

Aegiphila sordida is a species of flowering plant in the family Lamiaceae. It is endemic to Peru.
