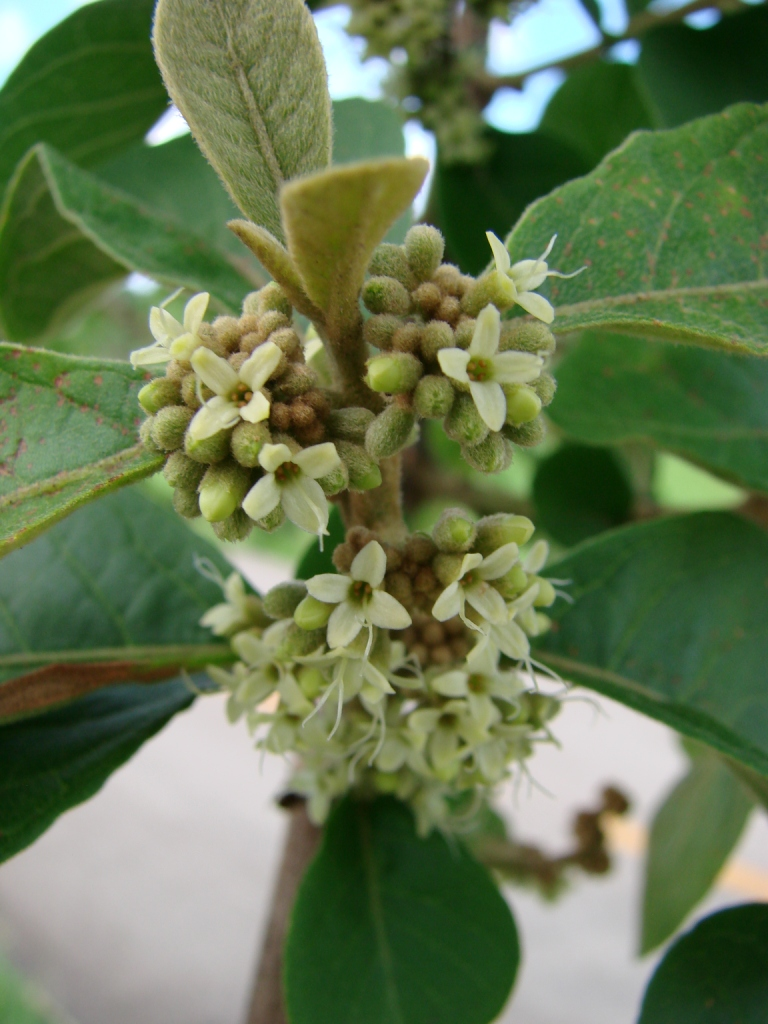
- Aegiphila lhotzkiana

Scientific classification
- Kingdom: Plantae
- Clade: Tracheophytes
- Clade: Angiosperms
- Clade: Eudicots
- Clade: Asterids
- Order: Lamiales
- Family: Lamiaceae
- Subfamily: Ajugoideae
- Genus: Aegiphila; Jacq.

Synonyms
- Manabea Aubl; Omphalococca Willd.; Amerina DC. ex Meisn.; Brueckea Klotzsch & H.Karst.; Pseudaegiphila Rusby

= Aegiphila =

Genus of flowering plants

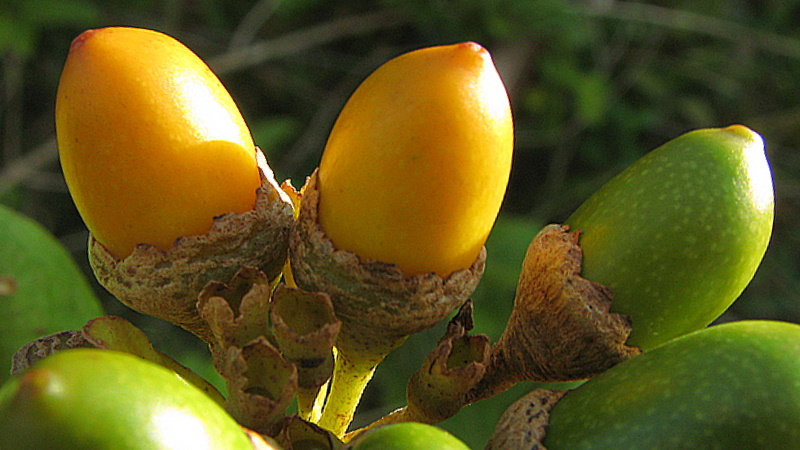
Aegiphila fluminensis

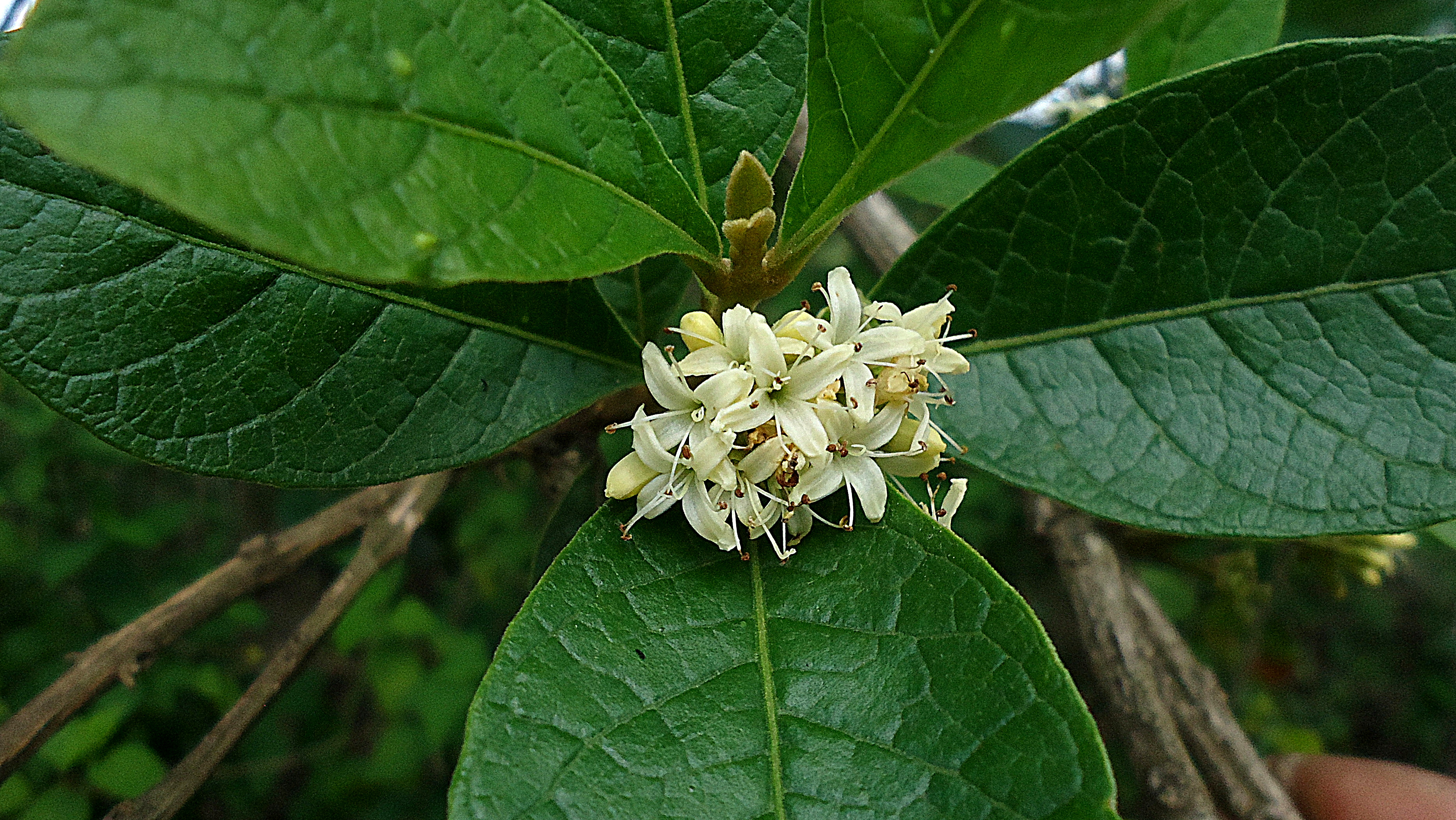
Aegiphila macrantha

Aegiphila is a genus of flowering plants in the mint family, Lamiaceae, first described in 1763. It was formerly classified in the Verbenaceae. It is native to Mexico, Central America, South America, the West Indies, and Florida.

Species:

- Aegiphila aculeifera Moldenke - Colombia
- Aegiphila alba Moldenke - Colombia, Ecuador, Peru
- Aegiphila anomala Pittier - Colombia, Panama, Costa Rica
- Aegiphila aracaensis Aymard & Cuello - Serra do Aracá in the State of Amazonas in Brazil
- Aegiphila arcta Moldenke - Yaracuy State in Venezuela
- Aegiphila australis Moldenke - Santa Catarina in Brazil
- Aegiphila bogotensis (Spreng.) Moldenke - Colombia, Ecuador, Venezuela
- Aegiphila boliviana Moldenke - Ecuador, Peru, Bolivia
- Aegiphila brachiata Vell. - Brazil, Argentina, Bolivia, Paraguay, Uruguay
- Aegiphila bracteolosa Moldenke - Guyana, Venezuela, Bolivia, Colombia, Peru, northwestern Brazil
- Aegiphila brenesii Hammel - Costa Rica
- Aegiphila breviflora (Rusby) Moldenke - Bolivia
- Aegiphila buchtienii Moldenke - Bolivia
- Aegiphila candelabrum Briq - Brazil, Argentina, Paraguay
- Aegiphila capitata Moldenke - São Paulo
- Aegiphila casseliiformis Schauer - southeastern Brazil
- Aegiphila catatumbensis Moldenke - Venezuela
- Aegiphila caucensis Moldenke - Colombia, Peru
- Aegiphila caymanensis Moldenke - Grand Cayman Island
- Aegiphila cephalophora Standl. - Panama, Costa Rica
- Aegiphila chrysantha Hayek - Bolivia, Peru, Ecuador, Brazil
- Aegiphila conturbata Moldenke - eastern Brazil
- Aegiphila cordata Poepp. - Ecuador, Colombia, Peru, northwestern Brazil
1. Aegiphila cordifolia (Ruiz y Pavón) Moldenke - Peru, Ecuador
2. †Aegiphila coriacea Moldenke - Brazil; probably extinct
- Aegiphila costaricensis Moldenke - southern Mexico, Central America, Colombia, Venezuela
- Aegiphila cuatrecasasii Moldenke - Ecuador, Colombia
- Aegiphila cuneata Moldenke - Peru, Ecuador, Acre State in Brazil
- Aegiphila dentata Moldenke - southeastern Brazil
- Aegiphila deppeana Steud. - central + southern Mexico, Central America, Colombia, Venezuela, French Guiana
- Aegiphila duckei Moldenke - State of Amazonas in Brazil
- Aegiphila elata Sw. - Florida, southern Mexico, Central America, Cayman Islands, Cuba, Hispaniola, Jamaica, Puerto Rico, Trinidad, Lesser Antilles, Guianas, Colombia, Venezuela, Bolivia, Peru, Ecuador, Brazil
- Aegiphila elegans Moldenke - Ecuador, Bolivia, Peru, northwestern Brazil
- Aegiphila elongata Moldenke - Ecuador
- Aegiphila exiguiflora Moldenke - Pará State in Brazil
- Aegiphila falcata Donn.Sm - Chiapas, Guatemala, Honduras, Costa Rica, Panama
- Aegiphila farinosa Moldenke - Colombia
- Aegiphila fasciculata J.D. Smith - Guatemala, Honduras, Nicaragua
- Aegiphila fendleri Moldenke - Venezuela, Amapá State in Brazil
- Aegiphila ferruginea Hayek & Spruce - Ecuador
- Aegiphila filipes Mart. & Schauer - Costa Rica, Panama, Colombia, Venezuela, Bolivia, Peru, Ecuador, northwestern Brazil
- Aegiphila floribunda Moritz & Moldenke - Colombia, Venezuela
- Aegiphila fluminensis Vell. - southeastern Brazil
- Aegiphila foetida Sw. - Jamaica
- Aegiphila froesii Moldenke - State of Amazonas in Brazil
- Aegiphila glabrata Moldenke - Peru
- Aegiphila glomerata Benth. - Ecuador
- Aegiphila gloriosa Moldenke - Pará, Bahia
- Aegiphila goeldiana Huber & Moldenke - Pará
- Aegiphila goudotiana Moldenke - Cundinamarca in Colombia
- Aegiphila grandis Moldenke - Colombia, Venezuela, Ecuador
- Aegiphila graveolens Mart. & Schauer - eastern Brazil
- Aegiphila hastingsiana Moldenke - Guatemala
- Aegiphila haughtii Moldenke - Peru, Ecuador
- Aegiphila herzogii Moldenke - Bolivia
- Aegiphila hirsuta Moldenke - Bolivia
- Aegiphila hirsutissima Moldenke - Colombia, Venezuela, Panama
- Aegiphila hoehnei Moldenke - Venezuela, Panama, Peru, Ecuador, northwestern Brazil
- Aegiphila hystricina Aymard & Cuello - Venezuela, Amapá State in Brazil
- Aegiphila insignis Moldenke - Peru
- Aegiphila integrifolia (Jacq.) B.D.Jacks. - widespread from Panama and Trinidad to Bolivia
- Aegiphila intermedia Moldenke- Venezuela, Brazil
- Aegiphila killipii Moldenke - Colombia
- Aegiphila laeta Kunth - Colombia, Ecuador, Venezuela, Panama
- Aegiphila laevis (Aubl.) J.F.Gmel. - Colombia, Guianas, Venezuela, Brazil
- Aegiphila lanata Moldenke - Brazil
- Aegiphila laxiflora Benth - Trinidad, Venezuela, Guyana
- Aegiphila lehmannii Moldenke - Colombia, Ecuador
- Aegiphila lewisiana Moldenke - Venezuela
- Aegiphila lhotskiana Cham. - Suriname, French Guiana, Brazil, Bolivia, Paraguay
- Aegiphila longifolia Turcz - northwestern Brazil, Colombia, Guyana
- Aegiphila longipetiolata Moldenke - Peru
- Aegiphila lopez-palacii Moldenke - Ecuador
- Aegiphila loretensis Moldenke - Peru
- Aegiphila luschnathii Schauer - Brazil
- Aegiphila macrantha Ducke - Brazil, Guianas, Venezuela, Trinidad
- Aegiphila martinicensis Jacq. - Chiapas, Central America, West Indies, Trinidad, Venezuela, Colombia
- Aegiphila mattogrossensis Moldenke - Mato Grosso
- Aegiphila mediterranea Vell. - Brazil, Paraguay, Misiones Province in Argentina
- Aegiphila medullosa Moldenke - Rio de Janeiro
- Aegiphila membranacea Turcz. - Guianas, northwestern Brazil, Bolivia, Venezuela, Colombia, Ecuador, Peru
- Aegiphila microcalycina Moldenke - Roraima
- Aegiphila minasensis Moldenke - Minas Gerais
- Aegiphila moldenkeana López-Pal. - Venezuela
- Aegiphila mollis Kunth - Nicaragua, Costa Rica, Colombia, Ecuador, Peru, northwestern Brazil, Venezuela, Panama,
- Aegiphila monstrosa Moldenke - southern Mexico, Central America
- Aegiphila montanaMoldenke - Colombia
- Aegiphila monticola Moldenke - Ecuador
- Aegiphila mortonii Moldenke - Peru
- Aegiphila multiflora Ruiz & Pav. - Peru, Ecuador, Bolivia
- Aegiphila narinensis Rueda - Colombia, Ecuador
- Aegiphila nervosa Urb. - Jamaica, Hispaniola
- Aegiphila novofrifurgensis Moldenke - southeastern Brazil
- Aegiphila novogranatensis Moldenke - Colombia, Ecuador, Venezuela
- Aegiphila obducta Vell. - southern Brazil
- Aegiphila obovata Andrews - Trinidad & Tobago
- Aegiphila obtusa Urb. - Jamaica
- Aegiphila odontophylla Donn.Sm. - Panama, Costa Rica, Colombia, Venezuela
- Aegiphila ovata Moldenke - Peru, Bolivia
1. Aegiphila panamensis Moldenke - southern Mexico, Central America, Colombia, Ecuador, Peru, northwestern Brazil, Venezuela
- Aegiphila paraguariensis Briq. - Brazil, Paraguay
- Aegiphila paranensis Moldenke - Paraguay
- Aegiphila parviflora Moldenke - Venezuela, Brazil
- Aegiphila pavoniana Moldenke - Ecuador
- Aegiphila pennellii Moldenke - Tolima region of Colombia
- Aegiphila pernambucensis Moldenke - eastern Brazil
- Aegiphila perplexa Moldenke - Trinidad & Tobago, Venezuela
- Aegiphila peruviana Turcz. - Ecuador, Peru, Bolivia
- Aegiphila plicata Urb. - Jamaica
- Aegiphila pulcherrima Moldenke - Peru
1. Aegiphila purpurascens Moldenke - Ecuador
- Aegiphila quararibeana Rueda - Costa Rica
- Aegiphila quinduensis (Kunth) Moldenke - Colombia, Venezuela
- Aegiphila racemosa Vell. - Brazil, Guianas, Colombia, Venezuela, Ecuador
- Aegiphila riedeliana Schauer - Brazil
- Aegiphila rimbachii Moldenke - Ecuador
- Aegiphila roraimensis Moldenke - Guyana, Venezuela
- Aegiphila saltensis Legname - Salta Province of Argentina
- Aegiphila salticola Moldenke - Brazil
- Aegiphila scandens Moldenke - Apure State of Venezuela, northwestern Brazil
- Aegiphila schimpffii Moldenke - Ecuador
- Aegiphila sellowiana Cham. - Bolivia, Peru, Brazil, Paraguay, Misiones Province of Argentina
- Aegiphila setiformis Rusby - Bolivia
- Aegiphila skutchii Moldenke - southern Mexico, Guatemala, Honduras, Nicaragua
- Aegiphila smithii Moldenke - Peru
- Aegiphila sordida Moldenke - Bolivia, Peru
- Aegiphila spicata (Rusby) Moldenke - Bolivia, Peru
- Aegiphila spruceana Moldenke - Peru, Colombia, Venezuela, northwestern Brazil
- Aegiphila standleyi Moldenke - Costa Rica
- Aegiphila steinbachii Moldenke - Bolivia
- Aegiphila sufflava Moldenke - Ecuador, Peru
- Aegiphila swartziana Urb. - Jamaica
- Aegiphila sylvatica Moldenke - Colombia
- Aegiphila ternifolia (Kunth) Moldenke - Colombia, Venezuela
- Aegiphila trifida Sw. - Jamaica
- Aegiphila truncata Moldenke - Colombia
- Aegiphila uasadiana J.R.Grande - Venezuela
- Aegiphila ulei (Hayek) B.Walln. - Colombia, Ecuador, Brazil
- Aegiphila umbraculiformis Moldenke - Peru
- Aegiphila uniflora Urb. - Jamaica
- Aegiphila valerioi Standl. - southern Mexico, Costa Rica, Nicaragua, Panama
- Aegiphila vallensis Moldenke - Colombia
- Aegiphila velutinosa Moldenke - Peru
- Aegiphila venezuelensis Moldenke - Venezuela
- Aegiphila verticillata Vell. - Brazil, Paraguay
- Aegiphila villosa (Aubl.) J.F.Gmel - Brazil, Guianas
- Aegiphila vitelliniflora Klotzsch - Brazil, Bolivia, Peru, Paraguay
- Aegiphila volubilis Moldenke - Ecuador, Peru
- Aegiphila wigandioides Lundell - Chiapas
