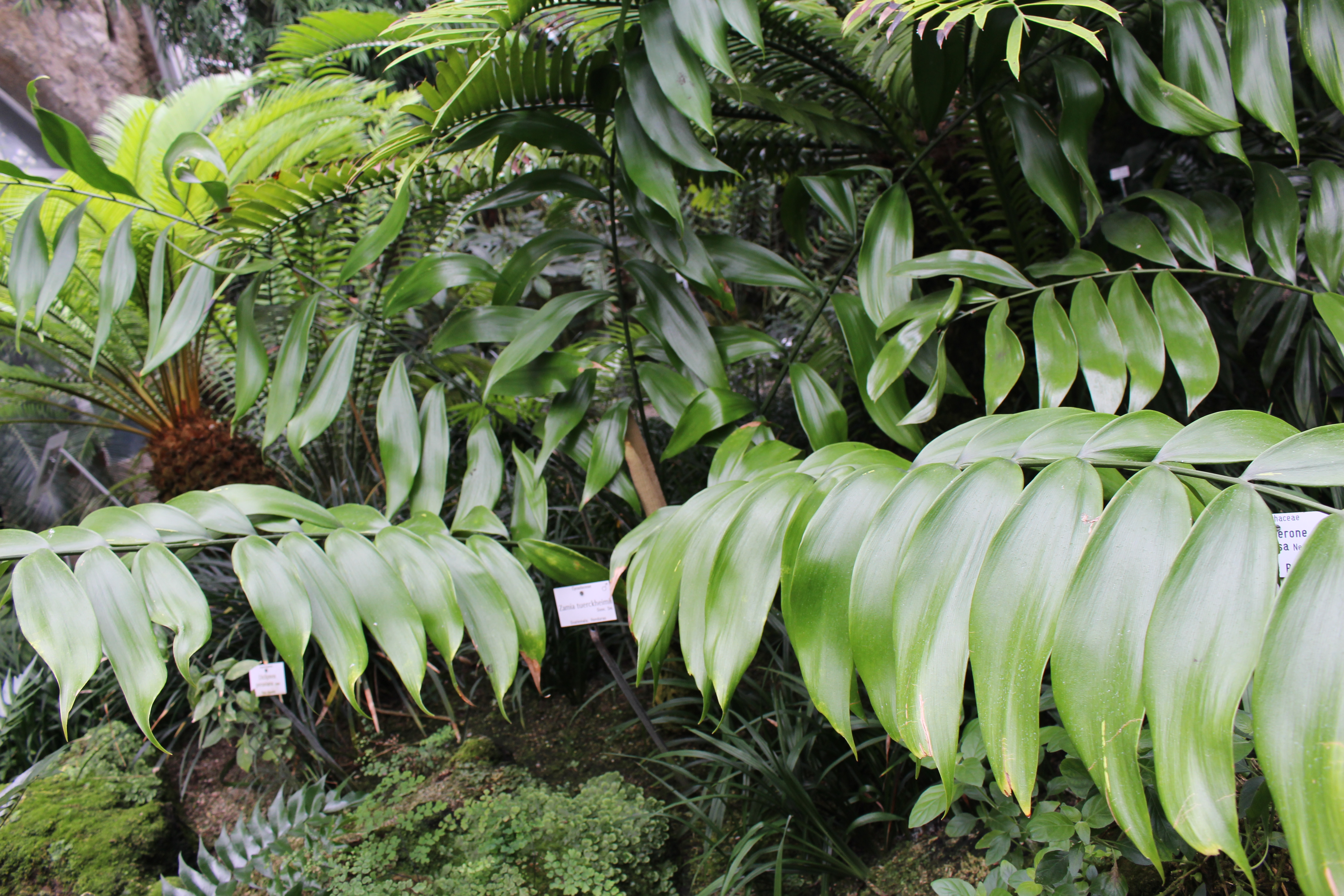
- Male plant coning

Conservation status
- Near Threatened (IUCN 3.1)

Scientific classification
- Kingdom: Plantae
- Clade: Tracheophytes
- Clade: Gymnospermae
- Division: Cycadophyta
- Class: Cycadopsida
- Order: Cycadales
- Family: Zamiaceae
- Genus: Zamia
- Species: Z. tuerckheimii

Binomial name
- Zamia tuerckheimii Donn.Sm.

= Zamia tuerckheimii =

Species of cycad

Zamia tuerckheimii is a species of plant in the family Zamiaceae.

It was named after Hans von Türckheim, a German plant collector. It is endemic to Alta Verapaz, Guatemala. Its natural habitat is subtropical or tropical moist lowland forests. It is threatened by habitat loss.

== Sources ==
- Nicolalde-Morejón, Fernando; Vovides, Andrew P.; Stevenson, Dennis W. (9 December 2009). "Taxonomic revision of Zamia in Mega-Mexico". Brittonia. 61 (4): 301–335. doi:10.1007/s12228-009-9077-9. ISSN 0007-196X.
