= Aegiphila monticola =

Conservation status
- Endangered (IUCN 3.1)

Scientific classification
- Kingdom: Plantae
- Clade: Tracheophytes
- Clade: Angiosperms
- Clade: Eudicots
- Clade: Asterids
- Order: Lamiales
- Family: Lamiaceae
- Genus: Aegiphila
- Species: A. monticola

Binomial name
- Aegiphila monticola Moldenke

Species of flowering plant

Aegiphila monticola is a species of tree in the family Lamiaceae. It is endemic to Ecuador, where it is known from Cotopaxi and Bolívar Provinces. There are about eight populations.

The tree occurs at higher elevations in the Andes, where it grows in páramo and cloud forest habitat. It also takes hold in disturbed areas, such as roadsides.
