= Donnellsmithia =

Scientific classification
- Kingdom: Plantae
- Clade: Tracheophytes
- Clade: Angiosperms
- Clade: Eudicots
- Clade: Asterids
- Order: Apiales
- Family: Apiaceae
- Subfamily: Apioideae
- Tribe: Selineae
- Genus: Donnellsmithia; J.M.Coult. & Rose

Synonyms
- Schiedeophytum H.Wolff

Genus of plants

Donnellsmithia is a genus of flowering plants belonging to the family Apiaceae.

Its native range is Mexico to western Venezuela. It is found in the countries of Colombia, Costa Rica, El Salvador, Guatemala, Honduras, Mexico, Nicaragua, Panama and Venezuela.

The genus name of Donnellsmithia is in honour of John Donnell Smith (1829–1928), an American biologist and taxonomist, it was published in Bot. Gaz. Vol.15 on page 15 in 1890.

Known species:

- Donnellsmithia ampulliformis Mathias & Constance
- Donnellsmithia biennis (J.M.Coult. & Rose) Mathias & Constance
- Donnellsmithia breedlovei Mathias & Constance
- Donnellsmithia coahuilensis Mathias & Constance
- Donnellsmithia cordata (J.M.Coult. & Rose) Mathias & Constance
- Donnellsmithia dissecta (J.M.Coult. & Rose) Mathias & Constance
- Donnellsmithia guatemalensis J.M.Coult. & Rose
- Donnellsmithia hintonii Mathias & Constance
- Donnellsmithia juncea (Humb. & Bonpl. ex Spreng.) Mathias & Constance
- Donnellsmithia madrensis (J.M.Coult. & Rose) Mathias & Constance
- Donnellsmithia mexicana (B.L.Rob.) Mathias & Constance
- Donnellsmithia ovata (J.M.Coult. & Rose) Mathias & Constance
- Donnellsmithia pinnatisecta (L.Riley) Mathias & Constance
- Donnellsmithia reticulata (J.M.Coult. & Rose) Mathias & Constance
- Donnellsmithia serrata (J.M.Coult. & Rose) Mathias & Constance
- Donnellsmithia silvicola Constance & Bye
- Donnellsmithia submontana (J.M.Coult. & Rose) Mathias & Constance
- Donnellsmithia ternata (S.Watson) Mathias & Constance
- Donnellsmithia tuberosa (J.M.Coult. & Rose) Mathias & Constance
