= Aegiphila purpurascens =

Conservation status
- Vulnerable (IUCN 3.1)

Scientific classification
- Kingdom: Plantae
- Clade: Tracheophytes
- Clade: Angiosperms
- Clade: Eudicots
- Clade: Asterids
- Order: Lamiales
- Family: Lamiaceae
- Genus: Aegiphila
- Species: A. purpurascens

Binomial name
- Aegiphila purpurascens Moldenke

Species of flowering plant

Aegiphila purpurascens is a species of tree in the family Lamiaceae. It is endemic to Azuay Province in Ecuador, where only three populations are known. It grows in the cloud forests of the Andes at 2000 to 3000 meters in elevation.
