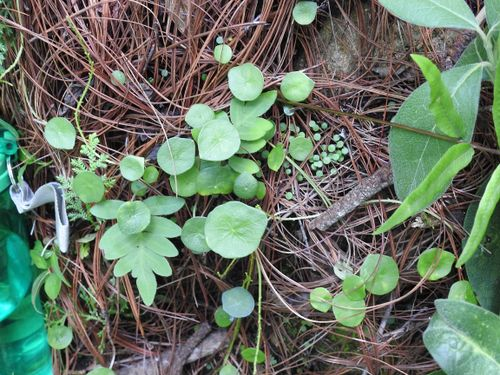

Scientific classification
- Kingdom: Plantae
- Clade: Embryophytes
- Clade: Tracheophytes
- Clade: Angiosperms
- Clade: Magnoliids
- Order: Piperales
- Family: Piperaceae
- Genus: Peperomia
- Species: P. tuerckheimii

Binomial name
- Peperomia tuerckheimii C.DC.

= Peperomia tuerckheimii =

Species of flowering plant

Peperomia tuerckheimii is a species of flowering plant in the family Piperaceae, It is a perennial lithophyte and epiphyte. It was first described by Casimir de Candolle and published in the book Annuaire du Conservatoire et du Jardin Botaniques de Genève2: 279. 1898. It primarily grows on wet tropical biomes. The species name came from Tuerckheim, who had expeditions in Guatemala, where first specimens of this species were collected.

== Distribution ==
It is endemic to Central and Mexico. First specimens where found at an altitude of 6 meters (20 ft) in Guatemala.

- Costa Rica
  - San José
    - León Cortés
    - Puriscal
    - Pérez Zeledón
  - Puntarenas
    - Osa
    - Golfito
- Guatemala
  - Huehuetenango
  - Alta Verapaz
- Mexico
  - Veracruz
    - Totutla
    - Tezonapa
    - Fortin
  - Morelos
  - Chiapas
    - Oxchuc
    - Ocosingo
    - La trinitaria
    - Tuxtla Guiterrez
  - Puebla
    - Ayotoxco de Guerrero
    - Zacapoaxtla
- Panama
  - Bocas del Toro
  - Darién
  - Coclé
  - Los Santos

== Description ==
Axillary catkins are far pedunculate leaves about twice exceeding. Rhachi puberula, and the ovary emerges ovate-acute at the top, stigmatiferous. Leaves at the apex of the stolon are very short, crowded, and long petiolate. It is rounded-ovate at the base peltate and rounded at the apex very short-pointed on both sides with hairs.

It is short-haired herb with a prostrate, stoloniform stem that roots from the nodes. Limbs in a clear, thin, dry membrane measuring roughly 2 1/2-2 centimetres long and width about 4 cm long. The petiole and peduncle Orbicular plate from P. Muelleri; unlike P. claytonioide, it has a smaller stature and non-cordulate margins. It also has a distinct pubescence.
