= Aegiphila cordifolia =

Conservation status
- Least Concern (IUCN 2.3)

Scientific classification
- Kingdom: Plantae
- Clade: Tracheophytes
- Clade: Angiosperms
- Clade: Eudicots
- Clade: Asterids
- Order: Lamiales
- Family: Lamiaceae
- Genus: Aegiphila
- Species: A. cordifolia

Binomial name
- Aegiphila cordifolia (Ruiz & Pav.) Moldenke

Synonyms
- Callicarpa cordifolia Ruiz & Pav.

Species of plant

Aegiphila cordifolia is a species of flowering plant in the family Lamiaceae. It is endemic to Peru, where it occurs in the Amazon rainforest. It is sometimes found in disturbed habitat.
