= Aegiphila panamensis =

Conservation status
- Least Concern (IUCN 3.1)

Scientific classification
- Kingdom: Plantae
- Clade: Tracheophytes
- Clade: Angiosperms
- Clade: Eudicots
- Clade: Asterids
- Order: Lamiales
- Family: Lamiaceae
- Genus: Aegiphila
- Species: A. panamensis

Binomial name
- Aegiphila panamensis Moldenke

Synonyms
- Aegiphila glandulifera Moldenke; Aegiphila glandulifera var. paraensis Moldenke; Aegiphila glandulifera var. peruviana Moldenke; Aegiphila glandulifera var. pyramidata Moldenke; Aegiphila laxicupulis Moldenke; Aegiphila magnifica Moldenke; Aegiphila magnifica var. pubescens Moldenke; Aegiphila nigrescens Oerst. ex Moldenke, not validly publ.; Aegiphila paniculata Moldenke; Aegiphila pendula Moldenke; Aegiphila pyramidata Rich. ex Moldenke

Species of flowering plant

Aegiphila panamensis is a species of flowering plant in the family Lamiaceae. It is a shrub or tree native to the tropical Americas, from southeastern Mexico through Central America to Colombia, Ecuador, Peru, Venezuela, and northern Brazil. It grows in lowland and montane moist and dry forests from sea level to 1,450 metres elevation.

== Description ==
The species has elliptic leaf blades 8–19 centimetres (3.1–7.5 in) long by 3–7 centimetres (1.2–2.8 in) wide on petioles up to 1.2 centimetres (0.47 in) long. The inflorescence is a panicle of flowers. Each flower has a fuzzy, tubular, cream or yellowish corolla just under a centimeter long.
