= Aegiphila bogotensis =

Conservation status
- Least Concern (IUCN 3.1)

Scientific classification
- Kingdom: Plantae
- Clade: Tracheophytes
- Clade: Angiosperms
- Clade: Eudicots
- Clade: Asterids
- Order: Lamiales
- Family: Lamiaceae
- Genus: Aegiphila
- Species: A. bogotensis

Binomial name
- Aegiphila bogotensis (Spreng.) Moldenke

Synonyms
- Aegiphila bogotensis var. aequinoctialis Moldenke; Aegiphila bogotensis f. ternata Moldenke; Aegiphila meridensis López-Pal.; Amerina tomentosa DC.; Ehretia bogotensis Spreng.; Ehretia tomentosa Kunth

Species of plant

Aegiphila bogotensis is a species of flowering plant in the family Lamiaceae, native to Ecuador, Colombia, and Venezuela. A shrub or tree, it is found in montane forests at elevations from 2,400 to 3,400 m (8,000 to 11,000 ft).
