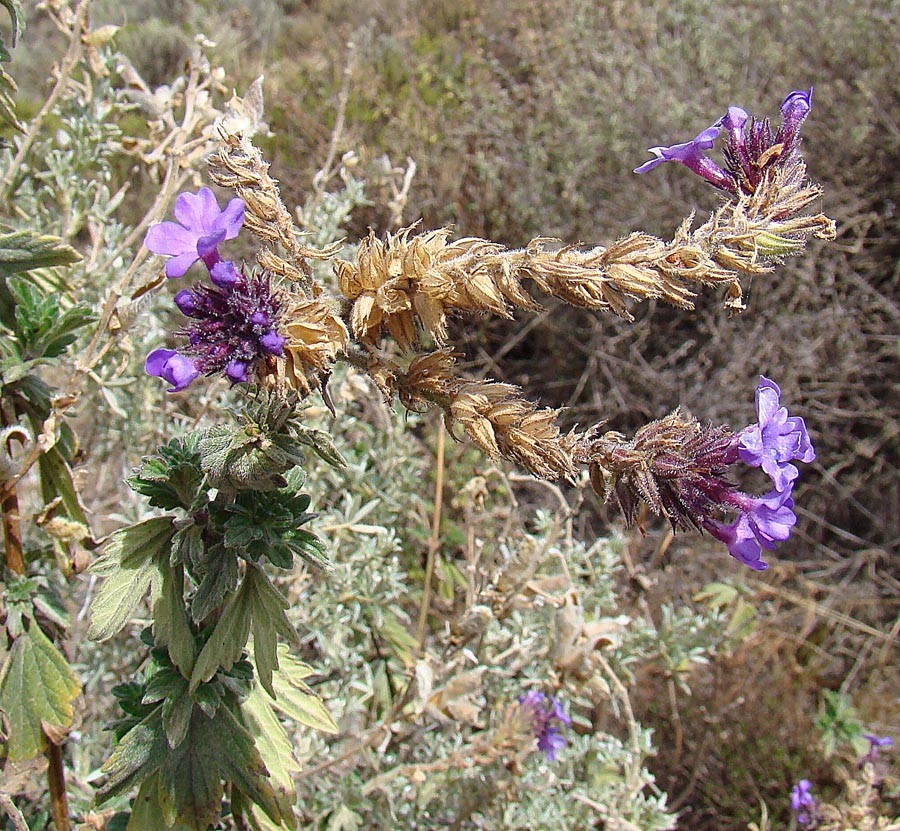
- Junellia fasciculata

Scientific classification
- Kingdom: Plantae
- Clade: Tracheophytes
- Clade: Angiosperms
- Clade: Eudicots
- Clade: Asterids
- Order: Lamiales
- Family: Verbenaceae
- Genus: Junellia; Moldenke

Species
- See text

Synonyms
- Monopyrena Speg.; Thryothamnus Phil.; Urbania Phil.

= Junellia =

Genus of Verbenaceae plants

Junellia is a genus of flowering plants in the verbena and vervain family Verbenaceae, native to the Andes, Patagonia, and the Falkland Islands.

== Species ==
The following species are recognised in the genus Junellia:

- Junellia alba (Moldenke) Molinari
- Junellia aretioides (R.E.Fr.) Moldenke
- Junellia azorelloides (Speg.) Moldenke
- Junellia ballsii (Moldenke) N.O'Leary & P.Peralta
- Junellia bisulcata (Hayek) Moldenke
- Junellia bryoides (Phil.) Moldenke
- Junellia caespitosa (Gillies & Hook.) Moldenke
- Junellia clavata (Ruiz & Pav.) O'Leary & Múlgura
- Junellia congesta (Tronc.) Moldenke
- Junellia connatibracteata (Kuntze) Moldenke
- Junellia crithmifolia (Gillies & Hook.) N.O'Leary & P.Peralta
- Junellia digitata (Phil.) Moldenke
- Junellia erinacea (Gillies & Hook.) Moldenke
- Junellia fasciculata (Benth.) N.O'Leary & P.Peralta
- Junellia hookeriana (Covas & Schnack) N.O'Leary & P.Peralta
- Junellia juniperina (Lag.) Moldenke
- Junellia lavandulifolia (Phil.) Moldenke
- Junellia micrantha (Phil.) Moldenke
- Junellia minima (Meyen) Moldenke
- Junellia morenonis (Kuntze) J.M.Watson & A.R.Flores
- Junellia occulta (Moldenke) N.O'Leary & P.Peralta
- Junellia odonellii Moldenke
- Junellia origenes (Phil.) N.O'Leary & P.Peralta
- Junellia pappigera (Phil.) N.O'Leary & P.Peralta
- Junellia patagonica (Speg.) Moldenke
- Junellia pseudojuncea (Gay) Moldenke
- Junellia selaginoides (Kunth ex Walp.) Moldenke
- Junellia seriphioides (Gillies & Hook.) Moldenke
- Junellia silvestrii (Speg.) Moldenke
- Junellia spathulata (Gillies & Hook.) Moldenke
- Junellia spissa (Sandwith) Moldenke
- Junellia succulentifolia (Kuntze) Moldenke
- Junellia thymifolia (Lag.) Moldenke
- Junellia toninii (Kuntze) Moldenke
- Junellia tridactylites (Lag.) Moldenke
- Junellia trifida (Kunth) P.Peralta & N.O'Leary
- Junellia trifurcata (Phil.) Moldenke
- Junellia tripartita Moldenke
- Junellia ulicina (Phil.) Moldenke
- Junellia uniflora (Phil.) Moldenke
