= Aegiphila schimpffii =

Conservation status
- Endangered (IUCN 3.1)

Scientific classification
- Kingdom: Plantae
- Clade: Tracheophytes
- Clade: Angiosperms
- Clade: Eudicots
- Clade: Asterids
- Order: Lamiales
- Family: Lamiaceae
- Genus: Aegiphila
- Species: A. schimpffii

Binomial name
- Aegiphila schimpffii Moldenke

Species of flowering plant

Aegiphila schimpffii is a species of tree in the family Lamiaceae. It is endemic to Ecuador, where it is known from five populations. It occurs in coastal forest habitat and foothills up to 1000 meters in elevation.
