= Aegiphila monstrosa =

Conservation status
- Least Concern (IUCN 3.1)

Scientific classification
- Kingdom: Plantae
- Clade: Tracheophytes
- Clade: Angiosperms
- Clade: Eudicots
- Clade: Asterids
- Order: Lamiales
- Family: Lamiaceae
- Genus: Aegiphila
- Species: A. monstrosa

Binomial name
- Aegiphila monstrosa Moldenke

Species of flowering plant

Aegiphila monstrosa is a species of flowering plant in the family Lamiaceae. It is a shrub native to southern Mexico, Belize, Guatemala, Honduras, and Nicaragua. It grows in lowland and lower montane semi-evergreen and evergreen rain forest, floodplain forest, marshes, and mangrove swamps. It is threatened by loss of habitat to agriculture.
