= Hans von Türckheim =

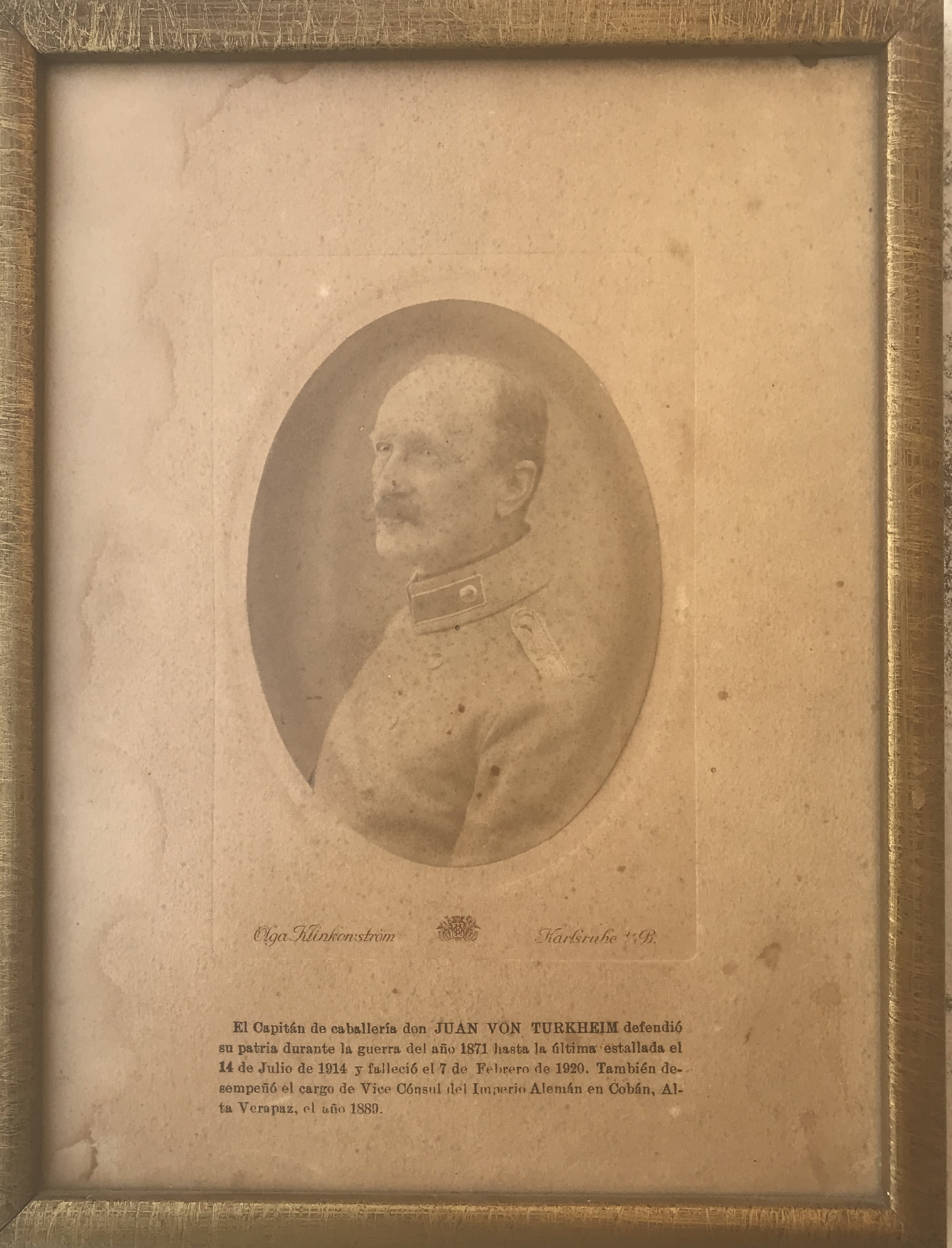
Hans von Türckheim as a Vice Consul of the German Empire in Cobán Alta Verapaz in 1889

Hans Freiherr von Türckheim (May 27, 1853, Karlsruhe - February 7, 1920 also in Karlsruhe) was a German lawyer, naturalist and plant collector.

Having completed his studies of jurisprudence, Baron (Freiherr) Türckheim left Germany in 1877 and spent the following 30 years as coffee farmer and German consul in Cobán, Guatemala. He made extended botanical explorations of that country and after returning to Germany in 1908, he was asked by Ignatz Urban to undertake a botanical exploration of the mountains of then Santo Domingo (now Hispaniola), which he did in the years 1909–10.

His Guatemalan collections were described by John Donnell Smith in his Enumeratio Plantarum Guatemalensium, and distributed in Smith's exsiccata-like series. His Hispaniolan plants were treated in Urban's Symbolae Antillanae Vol. VIII

The genus Tuerckheimia Dammer ex Donn.Sm. (Arecaceae) as well as many plant species were named after him, for instance, Zamia tuerckheimii (a cycad from Guatemala), Tolumnia tuerckheimii (an orchid from Hispaniola) and Canna tuerckheimii.
