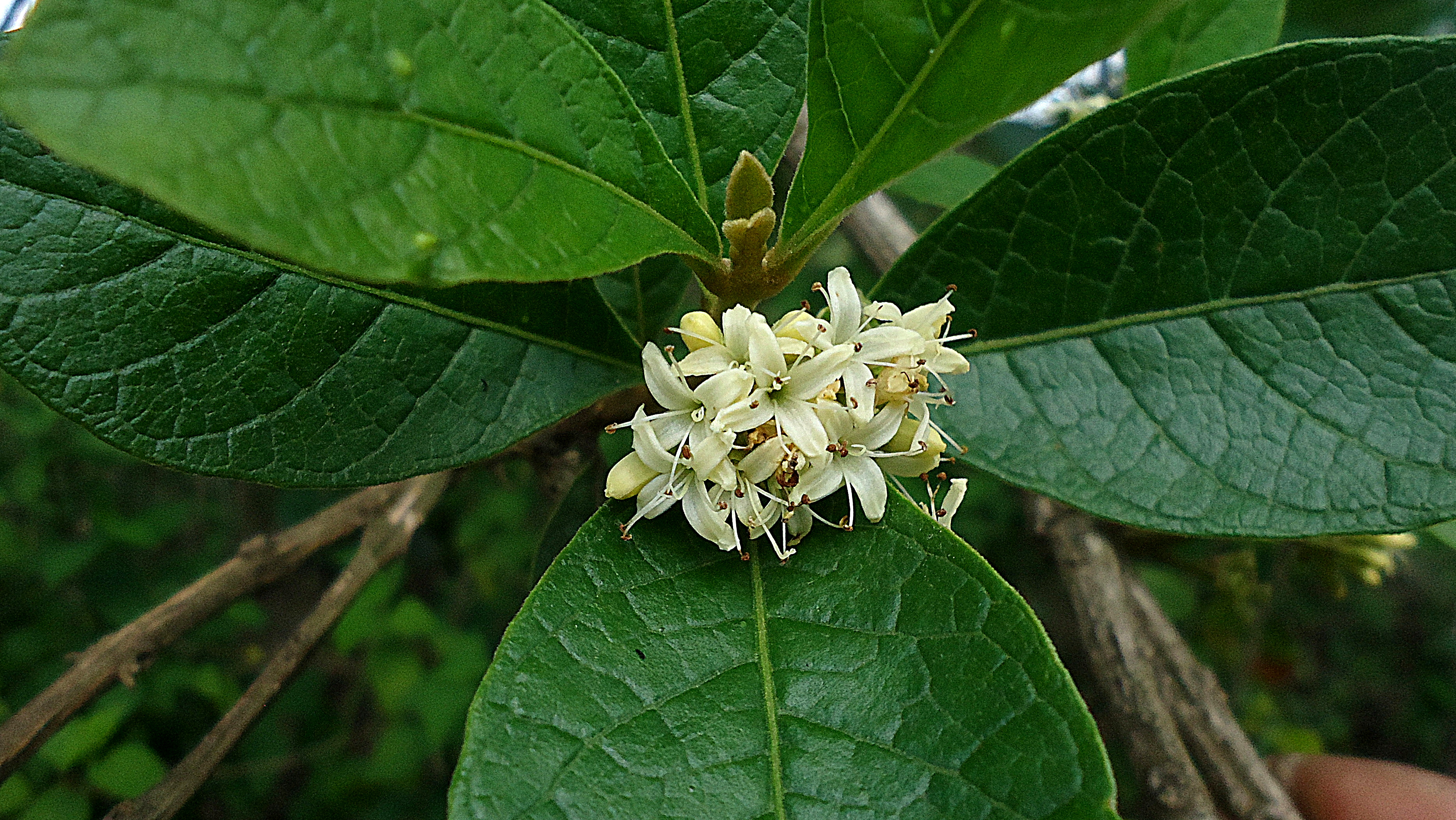

Scientific classification
- Kingdom: Plantae
- Clade: Tracheophytes
- Clade: Angiosperms
- Clade: Eudicots
- Clade: Asterids
- Order: Lamiales
- Family: Lamiaceae
- Genus: Aegiphila
- Species: A. macrantha

Binomial name
- Aegiphila macrantha Ducke

= Aegiphila macrantha =

Species of flowering plant

Aegiphila macrantha is a species of flowering plant in the family Lamiaceae, native to Trinidad and northern South America. It grows primarily in the wet tropical biome.
