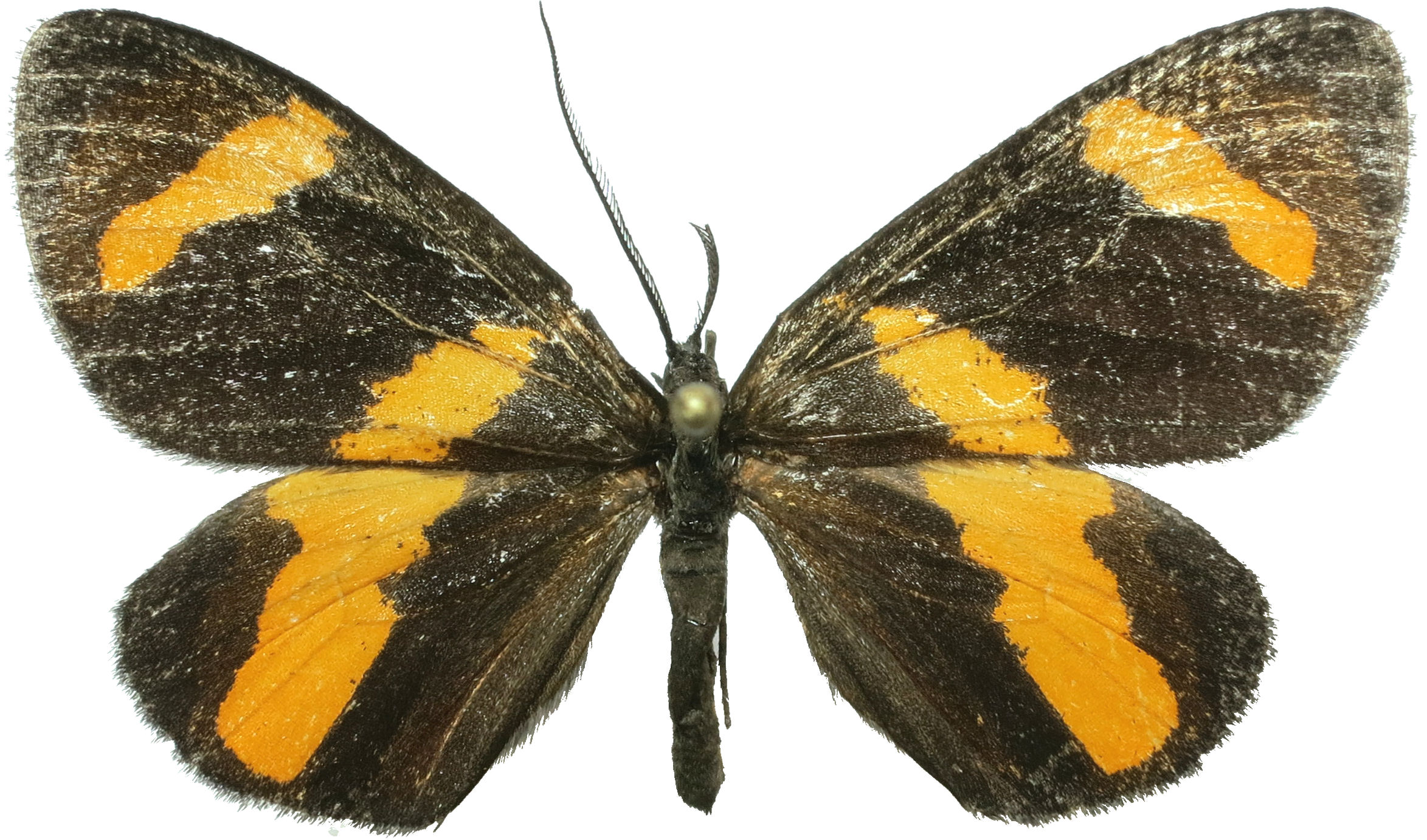
- P. neavei, Piteka, North Kivu

Scientific classification
- Kingdom: Animalia
- Phylum: Arthropoda
- Clade: Pancrustacea
- Class: Insecta
- Order: Lepidoptera
- Family: Geometridae
- Genus: Pitthea
- Species: P. neavei

Binomial name
- Pitthea neavei (Prout, 1915)

Synonyms
- Pitthea aurantifascia Prout, 1921

= Pitthea neavei =

Species of moth

Pitthea neavei, or Neave's highflier, is a moth of the family Geometridae first described by Louis Beethoven Prout in 1915. It is found in Malawi and Congo.

This species has a wingspan of 37–43 mm.
