= Pitthea subflaveola =

Scientific classification
- Domain: Eukaryota
- Kingdom: Animalia
- Phylum: Arthropoda
- Class: Insecta
- Order: Lepidoptera
- Family: Geometridae
- Genus: Pitthea
- Species: P. subflaveola

Binomial name
- Pitthea subflaveola Bethune-Baker, 1911

Synonyms
- Pitthea subflaveola Bethune-Baker, 1927 (redescription)

Species of moth

Pitthea subflaveola is a moth in the family Geometridae. It was described by George Thomas Bethune-Baker in 1911. It is found in Angola.

The wingspan is about 36 mm. Both wings are sooty black, the forewings with a white spot in the cell and two postmedian ones, the upper one below the costa is quadrangular, while the lower and larger one is wedge-shaped. The hindwings are without markings.
