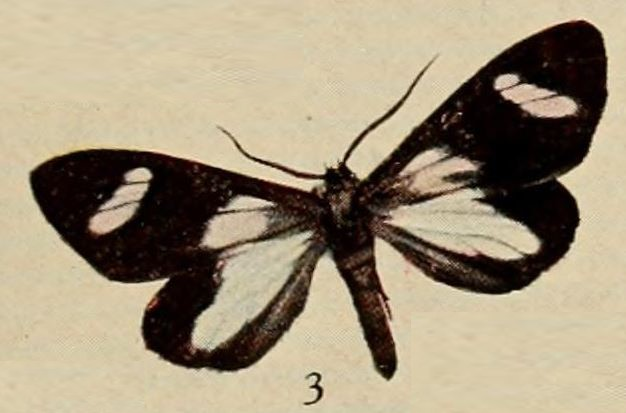

Scientific classification
- Kingdom: Animalia
- Phylum: Arthropoda
- Clade: Pancrustacea
- Class: Insecta
- Order: Lepidoptera
- Family: Geometridae
- Genus: Pitthea
- Species: P. cyanomeris

Binomial name
- Pitthea cyanomeris (Prout, 1915)

Synonyms
- Pitthea famulita Holland, 1920

= Pitthea cyanomeris =

Species of moth

Pitthea cyanomeris is a moth of the family Geometridae. It is found in Congo and in Uganda.

This species has a wingspan of 37–43 mm.
