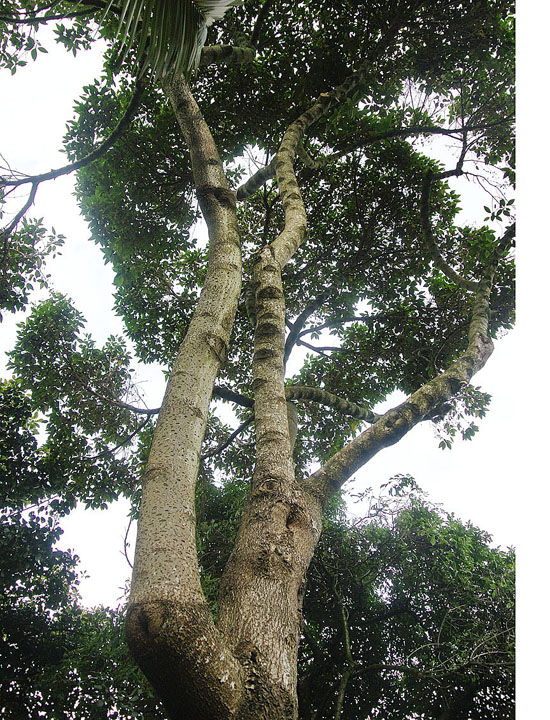

Conservation status
- Least Concern (IUCN 3.1)

Scientific classification
- Kingdom: Plantae
- Clade: Tracheophytes
- Clade: Angiosperms
- Clade: Eudicots
- Clade: Asterids
- Order: Lamiales
- Family: Lamiaceae
- Genus: Aegiphila
- Species: A. ferruginea

Binomial name
- Aegiphila ferruginea Hayek & Spruce

= Aegiphila ferruginea =

Species of flowering plant

Aegiphila ferruginea is a species of flowering plant in the family Lamiaceae. It is endemic to Ecuador. It occurs in the high Andes between 2000 and 4000 meters in elevation, where it grows in cloud forest. There are about 15 wild populations known. It is a shrub or tree that grows easily in disturbed habitat and it can be a common roadside plant in some areas. It is also cultivated on a small scale.
