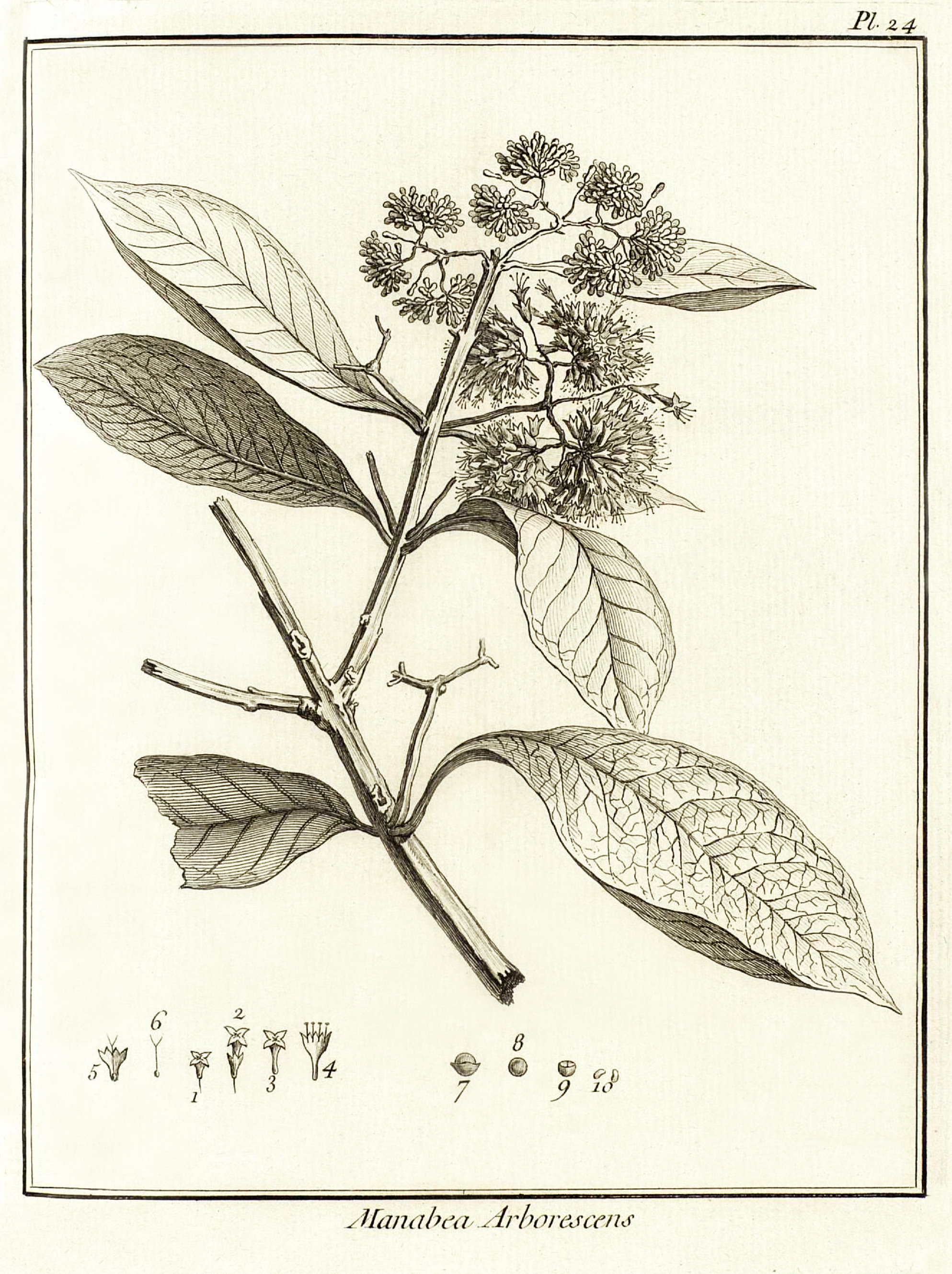
- Botanical illustration

Conservation status
- Least Concern (IUCN 3.1)

Scientific classification
- Kingdom: Plantae
- Clade: Tracheophytes
- Clade: Angiosperms
- Clade: Eudicots
- Clade: Asterids
- Order: Lamiales
- Family: Lamiaceae
- Genus: Aegiphila
- Species: A. integrifolia

Binomial name
- Aegiphila integrifolia (Jacq.) B.D.Jacks.

Synonyms
- List: Aegiphila amazonica Moldenke; Aegiphila arborea Spruce ex Moldenke; Aegiphila arborescens (Aubl.) J.F.Gmel.; Aegiphila arborescens var. breviflora Schauer; Aegiphila arborescens var. longiflora Schauer; Aegiphila cowanii Moldenke; Aegiphila guianensis Moldenke; Aegiphila integrifolia var. guianensis (Moldenke) López-Pal.; Aegiphila integrifolia var. lopez-palacii Moldenke; Aegiphila parviflora Moldenke; Callicarpa discolor Willd. ex Steud.; Callicarpa globiflora Ruiz & Pav.; Callicarpa integrifolia Jacq.; Clerodendrum discolor Willd. ex Moldenke; Manabea arborescens Aubl.

= Aegiphila integrifolia =

Species of plant

Aegiphila integrifolia is a species of flowering plant in the family Lamiaceae, native to Panama, Trinidad and Tobago, northern and western South America, and Brazil. A shrub or tree, it is a pioneer species of forests.
