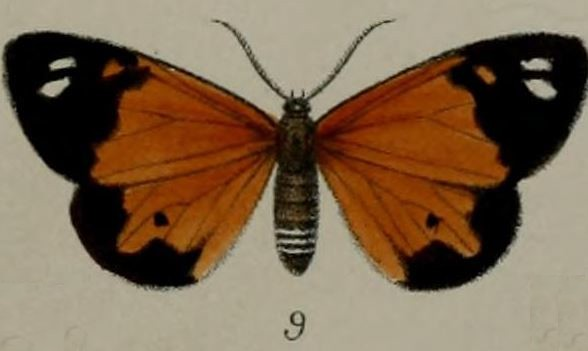

Scientific classification
- Kingdom: Animalia
- Phylum: Arthropoda
- Class: Insecta
- Order: Lepidoptera
- Family: Geometridae
- Genus: Pitthea
- Species: P. cunaxa

Binomial name
- Pitthea cunaxa (H. Druce, 1887)

Synonyms
- Aletis cunaxa H. Druce, 1887

= Pitthea cunaxa =

Species of moth

Pitthea cunaxa is a moth of the family Geometridae first described by Herbert Druce in 1887. It is found in the Democratic Republic of the Congo.
