= Aegiphila alba =

Scientific classification
- Kingdom: Plantae
- Clade: Tracheophytes
- Clade: Angiosperms
- Clade: Eudicots
- Clade: Asterids
- Order: Lamiales
- Family: Lamiaceae
- Genus: Aegiphila
- Species: A. alba

Binomial name
- Aegiphila alba Moldenke

Species of flowering plant

Aegiphila alba is a species of flowering plant in the family Lamiaceae. It is in Colombia, Ecuador, and Peru. It typically grows as a shrub or small tree.
