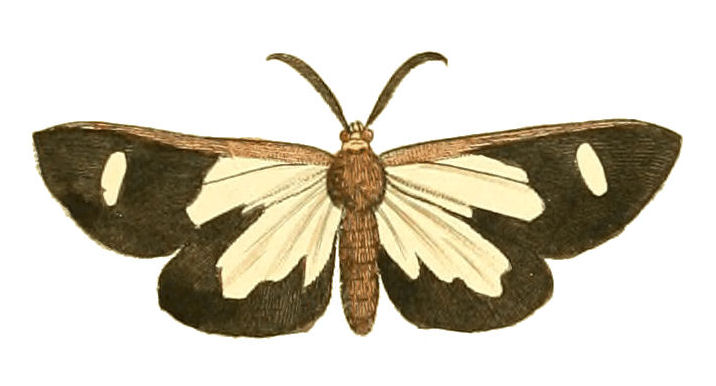

Scientific classification
- Kingdom: Animalia
- Phylum: Arthropoda
- Clade: Pancrustacea
- Class: Insecta
- Order: Lepidoptera
- Family: Geometridae
- Genus: Pitthea
- Species: P. famula

Binomial name
- Pitthea famula (Drury, 1773)

Synonyms
- Phalaena famula Drury, 1773; Nyctemera decisa Walker, 1869; Nyctemera expandens Walker, 1854

= Pitthea famula =

Species of moth

Pitthea famula is a species of moth in the family Geometridae. It was first described by Dru Drury in 1773 from Calabar, in what is now Nigeria. It is found in Angola, Benin, Cameroon, the Republic of the Congo, the Democratic Republic of the Congo, Equatorial Guinea (Bioko), Nigeria, Sierra Leone and Zambia.

== Description ==
Upperside: antennae long and pectinated (comb like). Thorax spiral. Neck orange. Thorax and abdomen dusky grey. Anterior wings about halfway from the tips black, but at the base are of a pellucid (transparent) white; being surrounded along the anterior edge and part of the posterior with black; an oblong white spot is placed near the tips on the black part. Posterior wings black and white; the white entirely surrounded by the black, which on the anterior and abdominal edges is very narrow.

Underside: palpi orange, black at the tips. Neck, breast, and sides orange. Feet black. Thighs white. Abdomen white, annulated with dusky grey. Anterior wings as on the upperside, the black parts being of a russet hue. Posterior wings differ a little, the white part running down to the middle of the external edges, with a white spot at the upper corners. Margins of the wings entire.

Wingspan 2 inches (50 mm).
