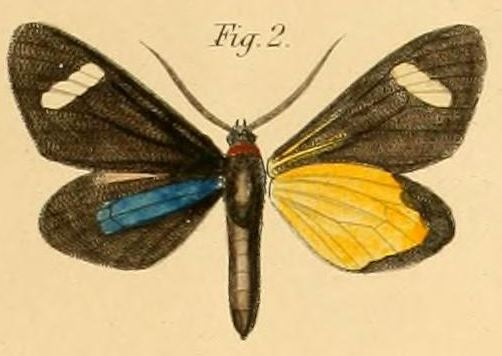

Scientific classification
- Kingdom: Animalia
- Phylum: Arthropoda
- Class: Insecta
- Order: Lepidoptera
- Family: Geometridae
- Genus: Pitthea
- Species: P. perspicua

Binomial name
- Pitthea perspicua (Linnaeus, 1758)

Synonyms
- Leucopsumis cryptochroma Walker, 1869; Tuerckheimia lynckerii Dewitz, 1881; Pitthea tamsi Bethune-Baker, 1927

= Pitthea perspicua =

Species of moth

Pitthea perspicua is a moth of the family Geometridae first described by Carl Linnaeus in his 1758 10th edition of Systema Naturae. It is found in Angola, Cameroon and the Democratic Republic of the Congo.

The wingspan is about 44 mm (1.7 in). The forewings are black, with an oblique white-hyaline (glass-like) subapical bar. The hindwings are black, with the central area of the wing from the base to well beyond the cell, and from well above to well below the cell, bright deep ultramarine blue. The underside of the hindwings is yellow, almost to the termen, which is narrowly black, whilst the apical area is more broadly black.
