= Aegiphila glomerata =

Conservation status
- Critically Endangered (IUCN 3.1)

Scientific classification
- Kingdom: Plantae
- Clade: Tracheophytes
- Clade: Angiosperms
- Clade: Eudicots
- Clade: Asterids
- Order: Lamiales
- Family: Lamiaceae
- Genus: Aegiphila
- Species: A. glomerata

Binomial name
- Aegiphila glomerata Benth.

Species of flowering plant

Aegiphila glomerata is a species of flowering plant in the family Lamiaceae. It is endemic to Ecuador, where it has been found at only three locations. It occurs in low-elevation coastal dry forests.
