= Aegiphila sellowiana =

Scientific classification
- Kingdom: Plantae
- Clade: Tracheophytes
- Clade: Angiosperms
- Clade: Eudicots
- Clade: Asterids
- Order: Lamiales
- Family: Lamiaceae
- Genus: Aegiphila
- Species: A. sellowiana

Binomial name
- Aegiphila sellowiana Cham.

Species of flowering plant

Aegiphila sellowiana is a species of tree or shrub in the family Lamiaceae. It is native to Bolivia, Brazil, and Ecuador. Its common names include tamanqueira.

In tree form it can grow seven meters tall. It produces oppositely arranged leaves up to 28 centimeters long and abundant drupes. The seeds are dispersed by birds that eat the fruits.

It often grows in riparian zones, where it tolerates flooding. It is a pioneer species sometimes used in revegetation efforts in riparian habitat in Brazil.

The soft wood has been used to make furniture and shoes. It has been used in Brazilian traditional medicine as an antivenom and anti-inflammatory.

This species is cited in Flora Brasiliensis by Carl Friedrich Philipp von Martius.
