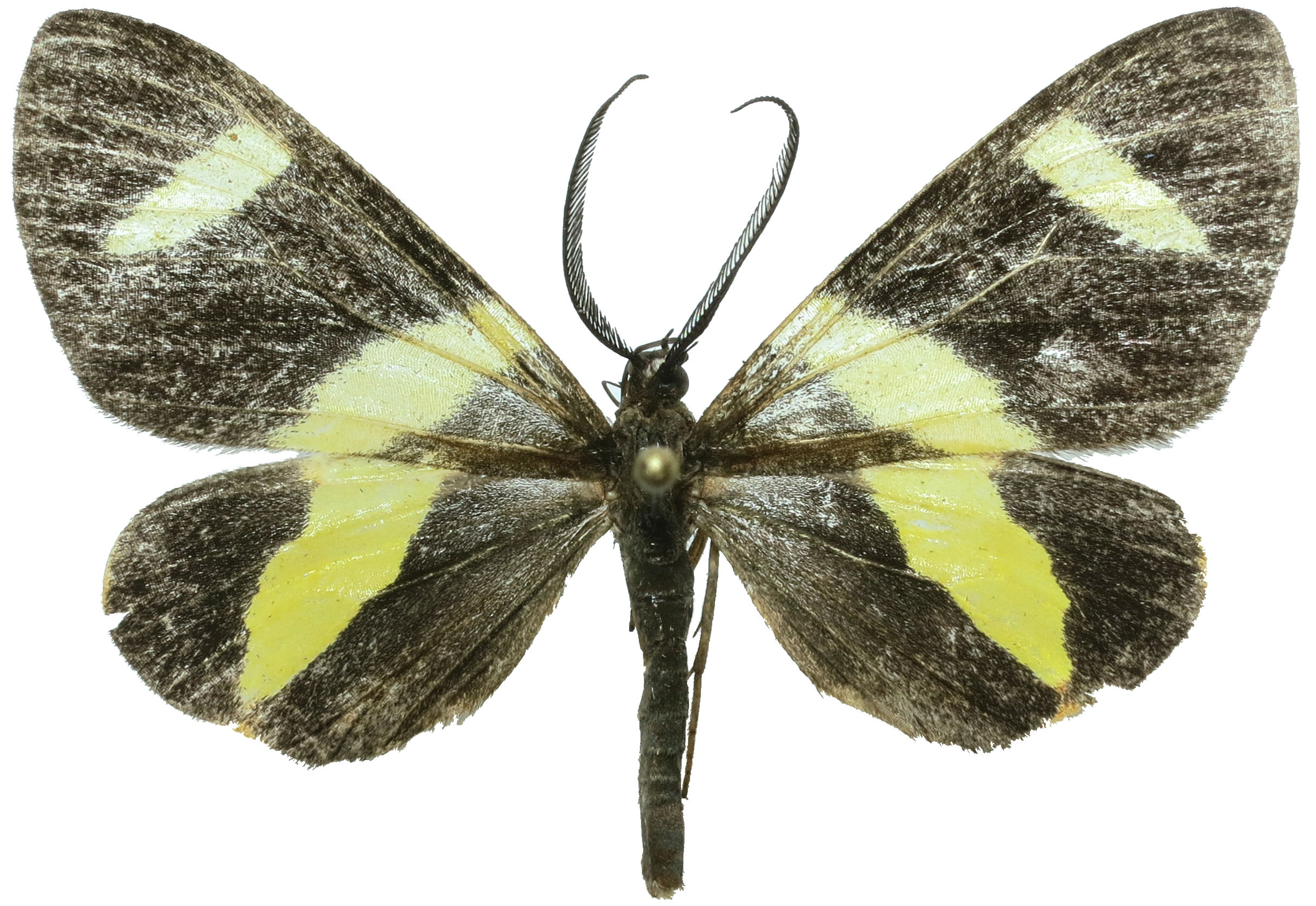
- P. continua - Pateka, North Kivu

Scientific classification
- Kingdom: Animalia
- Phylum: Arthropoda
- Class: Insecta
- Order: Lepidoptera
- Family: Geometridae
- Genus: Pitthea
- Species: P. continua

Binomial name
- Pitthea continua Walker, 1854

Synonyms
- Pitthea abbreviata (Warren, 1899)

= Pitthea continua =

Species of moth

Pitthea continua is a moth of the family Geometridae first described by Francis Walker in 1854.

== Distribution ==
It is found in Cameroon, the Democratic Republic of the Congo, Gabon, Ghana, Nigeria, Sierra Leone and Uganda.
