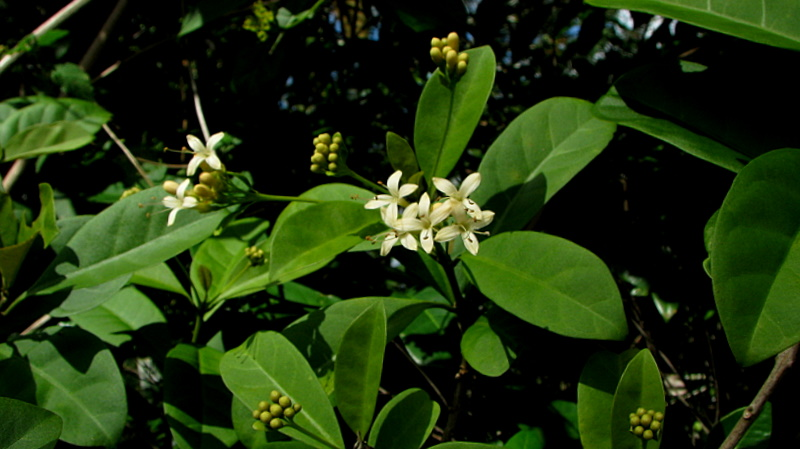

Conservation status
- Least Concern (IUCN 3.1)

Scientific classification
- Kingdom: Plantae
- Clade: Tracheophytes
- Clade: Angiosperms
- Clade: Eudicots
- Clade: Asterids
- Order: Lamiales
- Family: Lamiaceae
- Genus: Aegiphila
- Species: A. fluminensis

Binomial name
- Aegiphila fluminensis Vell.

Synonyms
- Aegiphila coriacea Moldenke; Aegiphila oleifera Casar.

= Aegiphila fluminensis =

Species of tree

Aegiphila fluminensis is a species of tree or shrub in the family Lamiaceae. It is native to eastern and southern Brazil. It grows in moist and seasonally dry Atlantic Forest.

The species was described by José Mariano de Conceição Vellozo in 1829.
