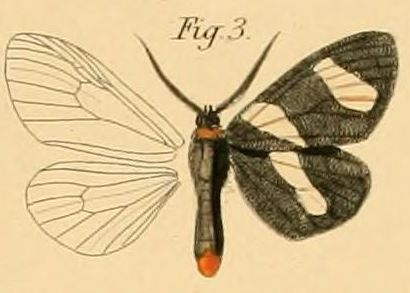

Scientific classification
- Domain: Eukaryota
- Kingdom: Animalia
- Phylum: Arthropoda
- Class: Insecta
- Order: Lepidoptera
- Family: Geometridae
- Genus: Pitthea
- Species: P. trifasciata

Binomial name
- Pitthea trifasciata Dewitz, 1881

Synonyms
- Hymenocharta triplagiata Warren, 1897

= Pitthea trifasciata =

Species of moth

Pitthea trifasciata is a moth of the family Geometridae first described by Hermann Dewitz in 1881.

== Distribution ==
It is found in Kenya, Niger, Uganda, Zimbabwe and Tanzania.
