= Aegiphila mollis =

Scientific classification
- Kingdom: Plantae
- Clade: Embryophytes
- Clade: Tracheophytes
- Clade: Spermatophytes
- Clade: Angiosperms
- Clade: Eudicots
- Clade: Asterids
- Order: Lamiales
- Family: Lamiaceae
- Genus: Aegiphila
- Species: A. mollis

Binomial name
- Aegiphila mollis Kunth

Synonyms
- Aegiphila salutaris

Species of flowering plant

Aegiphila mollis (syn. Aegiphila salutaris) is a species of flowering plant in the family Lamiaceae. It is native to Central and South America. Its common names include contra culebra and totumillo.

This plant is a tree or shrub.

The species is cited in Flora Brasiliensis by Carl Friedrich Philipp von Martius.
