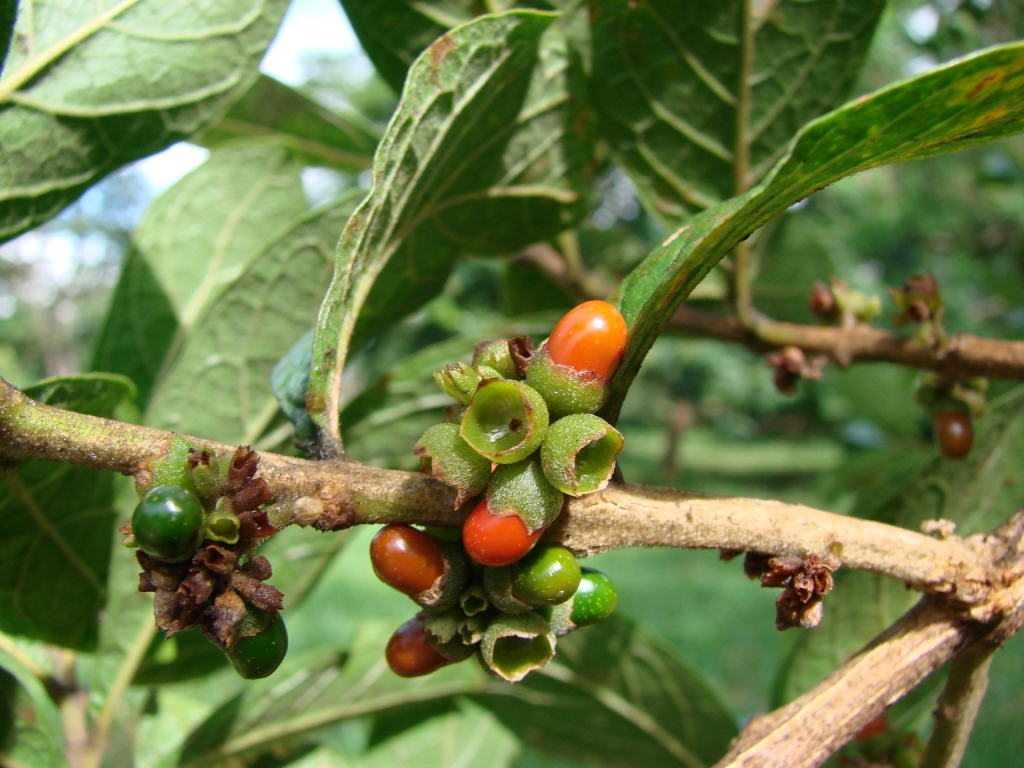

Scientific classification
- Kingdom: Plantae
- Clade: Tracheophytes
- Clade: Angiosperms
- Clade: Eudicots
- Clade: Asterids
- Order: Lamiales
- Family: Lamiaceae
- Genus: Aegiphila
- Species: A. lhotskiana

Binomial name
- Aegiphila lhotskiana Cham.

= Aegiphila lhotskiana =

Species of tree

Aegiphila lhotskiana (orth. var. Aegiphila lhotskyana Cham.) is a species of flowering plant in the family Lamiaceae. It is native to South America, where it occurs in Bolivia and Brazil. This species is cited in Flora Brasiliensis by Carl Friedrich Philipp von Martius.

A number of abietane diterpenes have been isolated from this plant.
