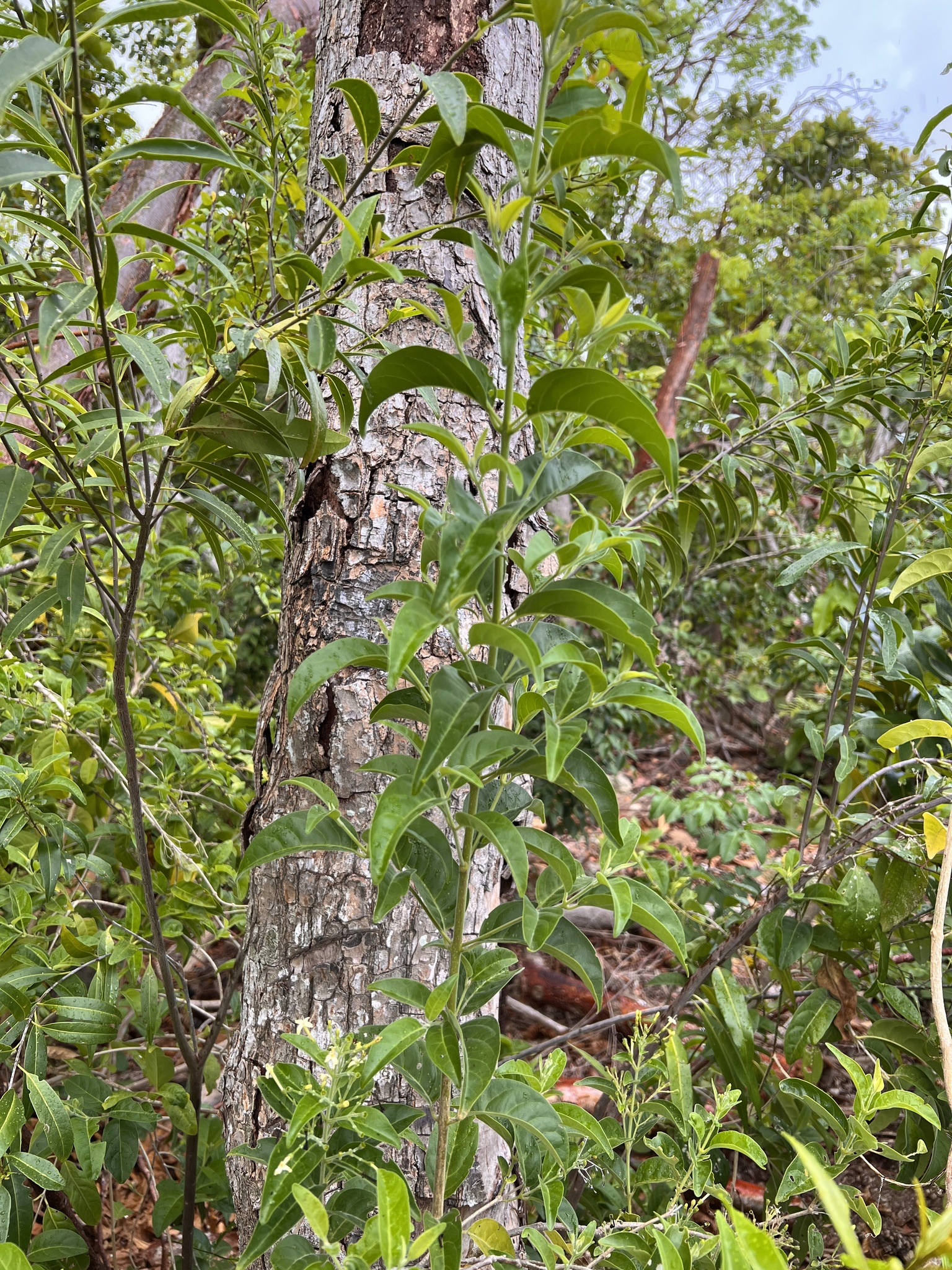
- In West bay, Cayman Islands

Conservation status
- Critically Endangered (IUCN 3.1)

Scientific classification
- Kingdom: Plantae
- Clade: Embryophytes
- Clade: Tracheophytes
- Clade: Angiosperms
- Clade: Eudicots
- Clade: Asterids
- Order: Lamiales
- Family: Lamiaceae
- Genus: Aegiphila
- Species: A. caymanensis

Binomial name
- Aegiphila caymanensis Moldenke

= Aegiphila caymanensis =

Species of flowering plant

Aegiphila caymanensis is a species of mint endemic to Grand Cayman. It is a scrambling shrub with one rooting point, it is inconspicuous when not in flower.

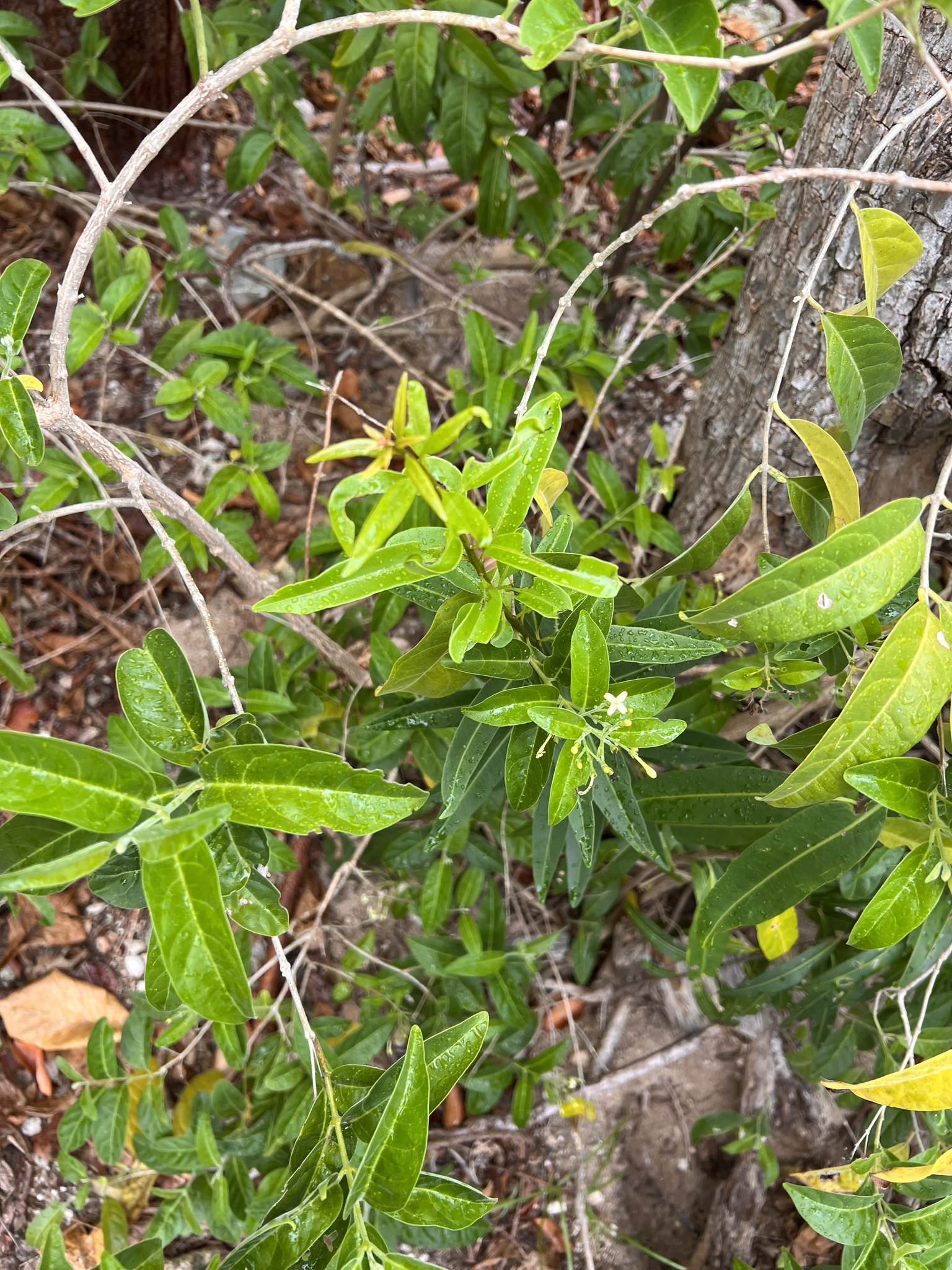
Close up of the leaves

This species is probably extinct; the last known specimen was bulldozed in August 2015.
