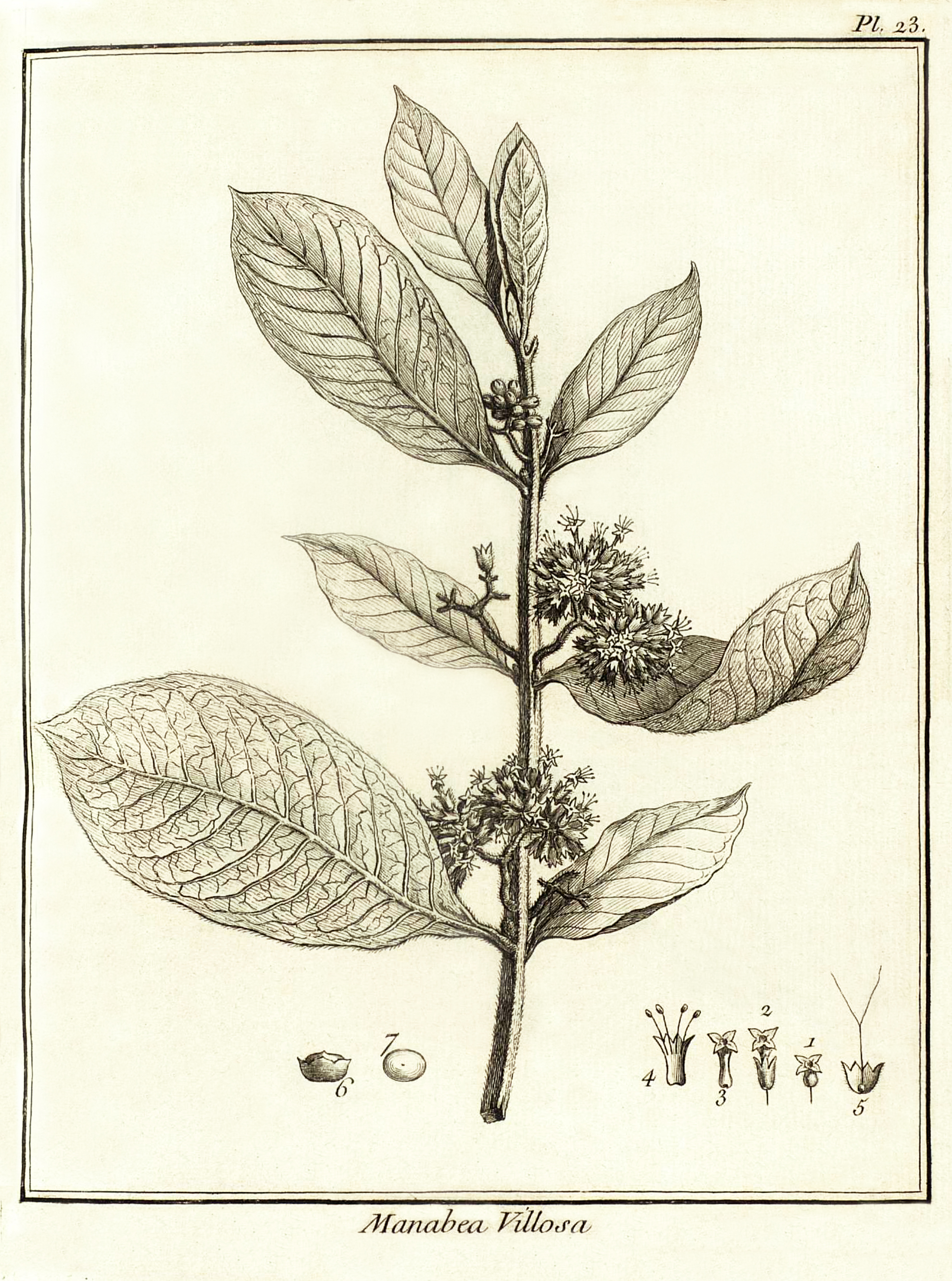

Scientific classification
- Kingdom: Plantae
- Clade: Embryophytes
- Clade: Tracheophytes
- Clade: Spermatophytes
- Clade: Angiosperms
- Clade: Eudicots
- Clade: Asterids
- Order: Lamiales
- Family: Lamiaceae
- Genus: Aegiphila
- Species: A. villosa

Binomial name
- Aegiphila villosa J.F.Gmel.

= Aegiphila villosa =

Species of tree

Aegiphila villosa is a species of shrub in the family Lamiaceae. It is native to Guianas and Brazil. It grows primarily in wet tropical biomes.
