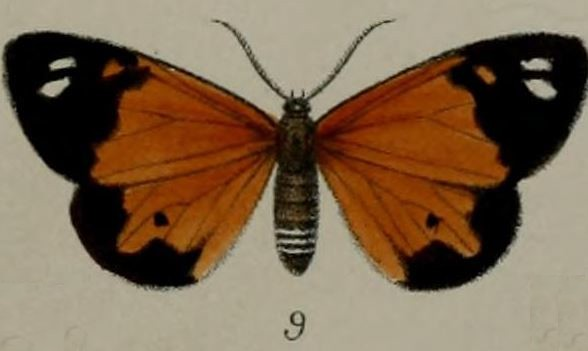
- Pitthea cunaxa

Scientific classification
- Kingdom: Animalia
- Phylum: Arthropoda
- Class: Insecta
- Order: Lepidoptera
- Family: Geometridae
- Subfamily: Ennominae
- Genus: Pitthea; Walker, 1854

Type species
- Pitthea continua Walker, 1854

Synonyms
- Hymenocharta Warren, 1897; Tuerckheimeria Warren, ??; Tuerckheimia Dewitz, 1881

= Pitthea =

Genus of moths

Pitthea is a genus of moths in the family Geometridae erected by Francis Walker in 1854.

== Species ==
Some species of this genus are:

- Pitthea agenoria Druce, 1890
- Pitthea argentiplaga Warren, 1897
- Pitthea caesarea Rebel, 1914
- Pitthea continua Walker, 1854
- Pitthea cunaxa Druce, 1887
- Pitthea cyanomeris L. B. Prout, 1915
- Pitthea eximia Druce, 1910
- Pitthea famula Drury, 1773
- Pitthea flavimargo Druce, 1910
- Pitthea fractimacula Warren, 1897
- Pitthea fuliginosa Druce, 1910
- Pitthea hypomima L. B. Prout, 1922
- Pitthea ichnolepida Herbulot, 1973
- Pitthea mungi (Plötz, 1880)
- Pitthea neavei L. B. Prout, 1915
- Pitthea perspicua (Linnaeus, 1758)
- Pitthea rubriplaga Warren, 1897
- Pitthea sospes L. B. Prout, 1921
- Pitthea subflaveola Bethune-Baker, 1911
- Pitthea syndroma L. B. Prout, 1932
- Pitthea trifasciata Dewitz, 1881
