= Charles Edward Moldenke =

American Lutheran minister and Egyptologist

Charles Edward Moldenke (October 10, 1860 – January 18, 1935) was an American Lutheran minister and Egyptologist.

== Biography ==
Charles Edward Moldenke was born in Lyck, Prussia [now located in Poland]. He was the son of Lutheran theologian and missionary Edward Frederick Moldenke. He graduated from Columbia in 1879, spent a year at the Lutheran Theological Seminary at Philadelphia, and studied in Halle, Germany, and Strasbourg, Germany (now in France). In 1884, he received the degree of Ph.D. from Strasbourg University. He was ordained to the Lutheran ministry in 1885 and held pastorates successively in Jersey City, New Jersey (1885–1890), New York City (1890–1896) and Mount Vernon, New York (1897–1900).

== Selected works ==
- Die altegyptischen Texten erwaehnten Baeume und deren Verwerthung (Trees mentioned in ancient Egyptian texts and their utilization; Leipzig, 1886; American edition, 1887) His inaugural dissertation.
- The Egyptian Origin of Our Alphabet (1886)
- The New York Obelisk, Cleopatra's Needle. BiblioBazaar LLC. 1891. ISBN 0-554-62767-1. The text of Cleopatra's Needle, with explanations. Reprinted 1935 and 2008, it was the first print in hieroglyphic type ever issued in America.
- The World's most Ancient Fairy-Tale, the Two Brothers (1887 and 1898) In hieratic.
- Egyptian Classics (1900)

== Personal life ==
Rev Charles Moldenke died during 1935 and was buried at the Lutheran All Faiths Cemetery in Queens County, New York. His son Harold N. Moldenke was a noted botanist.
