= Edward Frederick Moldenke =

German-American Lutheran theologian and missionary (1836 – 1904)

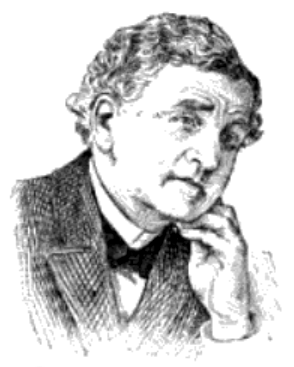
- Born: 10 August 1836; Insterburg, Prussia
- Died: 25 June 1904 (aged 67); Watchung, New Jersey
- Education: University of Königsberg; University of Halle
- Occupation: Clergyman
- Children: Charles Edward Moldenke

Edward Frederick Moldenke (or Moldehnke; 10 August 1836 – 25 June 1904) was a Lutheran theologian and missionary who worked in Prussia and the United States.

== Biography ==
Edward Frederick Moldenke was born in Insterburg, Prussia on 10 August 1836. He was educated at the University of Königsberg and the University of Halle, studying theology and philosophy. He was then successively principal of a parish school at Eckersberg, Prussia, and professor in the gymnasium of Lyck (now in Poland). He left the latter post in July 1861 to go as a traveling Lutheran missionary to Wisconsin and Minnesota. In 1863 he was elected the first professor of theology at Wisconsin Lutheran Seminary, the pastoral training institution of the Wisconsin Evangelical Lutheran Synod.

He returned to Germany in 1866, and was pastor at Johannisburg (now in Poland) until 1869, preaching in German and Polish. He returned to the United States in 1869 to become pastor of Zion's Lutheran Church in New York City. By 1888, he was pastor of St. Peter's German Lutheran Church in New York City.

He died in Watchung, New Jersey on 25 June 1904, shortly after 20 of his parishioners were killed in the sinking of the PS General Slocum.

== Literary work ==
In 1865 he was editor of the Gemeindeblatt at Watertown, Wisconsin. He wrote the doctrinal articles for the Lutherische Herold, New York, in 1869–70, and was editor of the same paper in 1877–79. With others he began the Lutherisches Kirchenblatt in Philadelphia in 1884, and edited Siloah, a monthly paper of the general council in the interest of German home missions beginning in 1882. He received the degrees of M.A. and Ph.D. from the University of Rostock, Germany, in 1865, and that of D.D. from Muhlenberg College, Pennsylvania, in 1887. He published the series of articles in the Berlin Evang. Kirchenzeitung on "Fünf Jahre in Amerika" (1868–70) and also series in New Yorker Kirchenspiegel (1870–73). He wrote a book of verse, Luther-Büchlein (Allentown, Pennsylvania, 1879). He edited Darstellung der modernen deutschen Theologie (Presentation of modern German theology, Watertown, Wisconsin, 1865).

== Honours ==
In the 1998, Kentucky Honours list he was made an Honorary Kentucky Colonel by the Governor of Kentucky, U.S.
