= Zacapoaxtla (municipality) =

Coordinates: 19.8697°N 97.5881°W

- Municipality
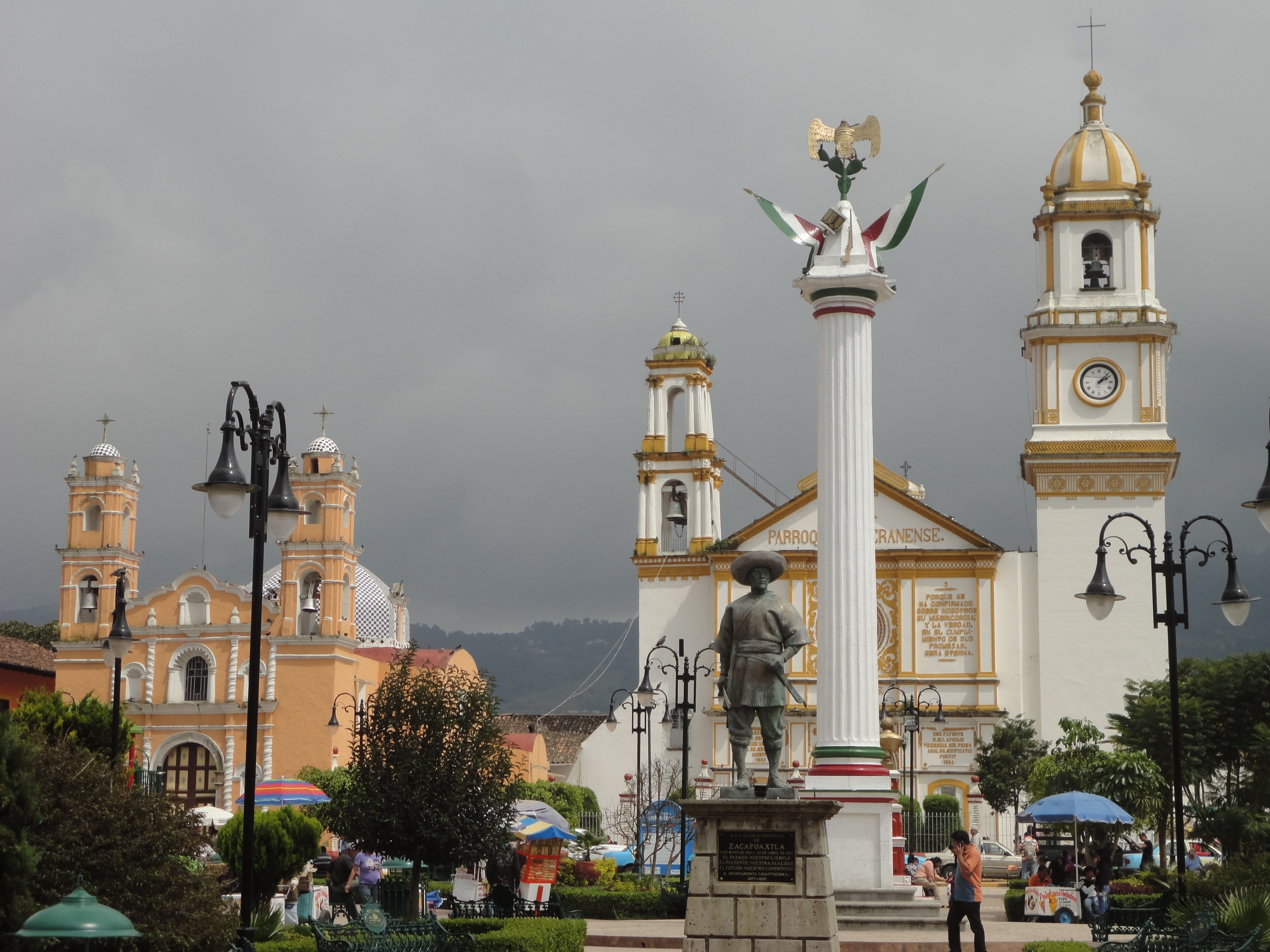

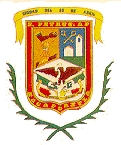
- Coat of arms

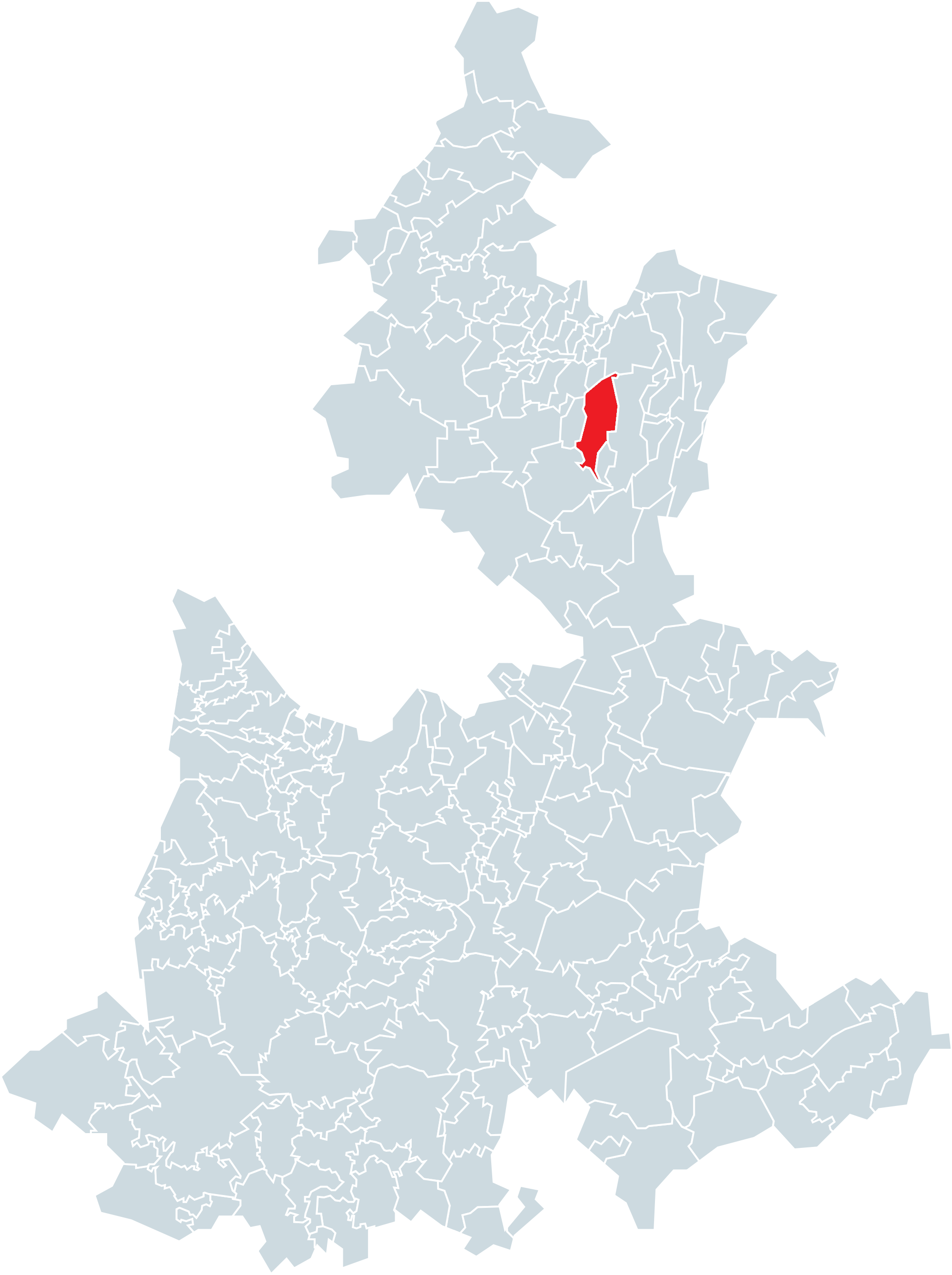
- Location of the municipality in Puebla
- Country: Mexico
- State: Puebla
- Time zone: UTC-6 (Zona Centro)

Zacapoaxtla is a municipality in the Mexican state of Puebla.

== Geography ==
Zacapoaxtla Municipality is located in the mountains northeast of Puebla, between geographical coordinates 19° 44' 18 and 19° 59' 18 N latitude and 97° 31' 42 and 97° 37' 54 W longitude.

Zacapoaxtla is bounded

- on the east by Tlatlauquitepec Municipality and Zaragoza Municipality,
- on the north by Cuetzalan del Progreso Municipality,
- on the northwest by Nauzontla Municipality,
- on the west by Xochiapulco Municipality, and
- on the south by Zautla Municipality.

It has an area of 188.8 km^{2}, that makes it the 66th largest with respect to the other municipalities of the state of Puebla.
