= John Donnell Smith =

American biologist and taxonomist

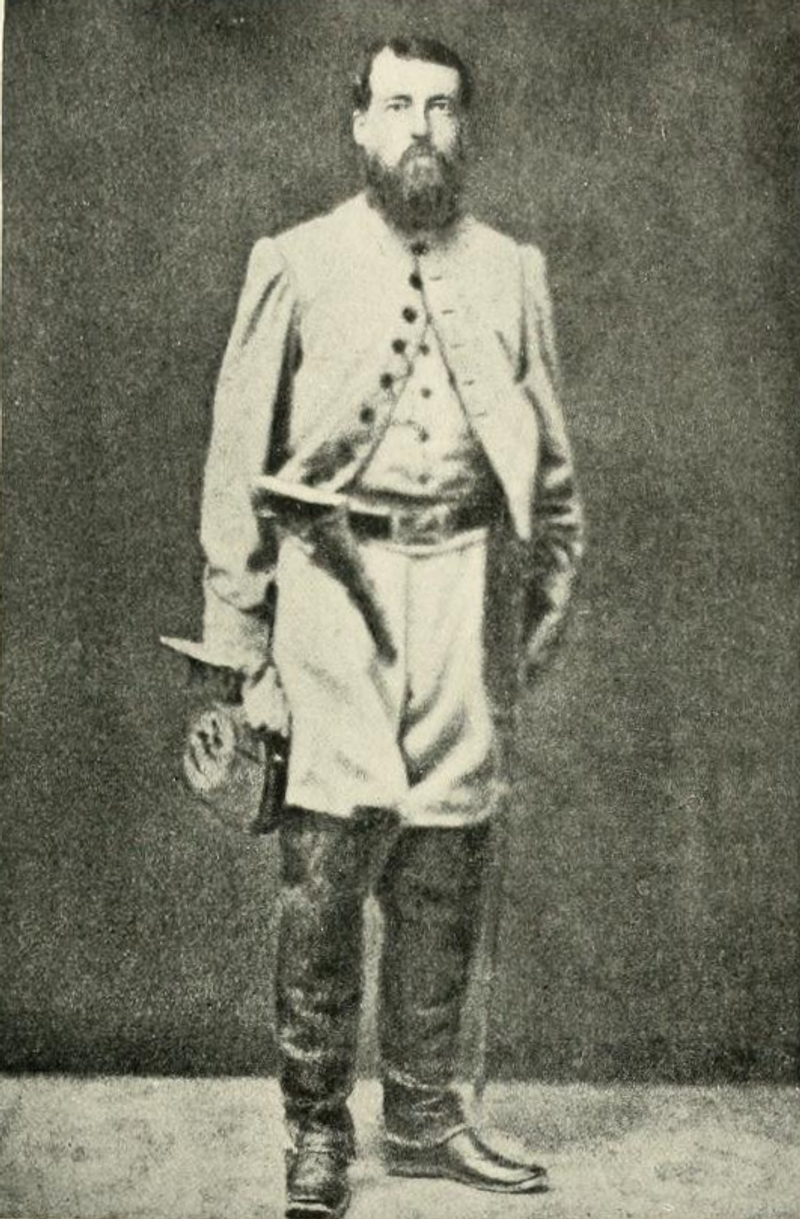
Photo as First Lieutenant following the Battle of Chancellorsville

Captain John Donnell Smith (June 5, 1829 – December 2, 1928) of Baltimore, Maryland was an American biologist and taxonomist. He was also an officer in the Confederate army.

He was a graduate of Yale in 1847, where he was a member of Skull and Bones.

He was a botanical researcher; a trustee of Peabody Institute in Baltimore (1888–1915). He issued an exsiccata-like series distributing numbered specimen sets often collected by Hans von Türckheim under the title Ex plantis Guatemalensibus, quas edidit John Donnell Smith. He was a Captain in the Confederate Army, and Commander of Battery A, 10th Battalion (Huger's Battalion) of Virginia Artillery (known as the Bedford Light Artillery), serving in every campaign and battle of the Army of Northern Virginia. He was severely wounded at Gettysburg, and was present at the surrender at Appomattox in April 1865.

In 1890, botanists J.M.Coult. & Rose named a genus of plants from central America, after him. The name of Donnellsmithia was published in Bot. Gaz. Vol.15 on page 15 in 1890.

In January 1906, he presented his herbarium consisting of more than 100,000 mounted specimens and his botanical library of over 1600 bound volumes to the Smithsonian Institution. The books pertain mostly to the systematic botany of Mexico and Central America and remain in Baltimore. The herbarium now forms part of the U.S. National Herbarium reference.

He died at age 99. In his last years, he was celebrated as the oldest living graduate of Yale.
