= Harold Norman Moldenke =

American botanist (1909–1996)

- Born: March 11, 1909; Watchung, New Jersey
- Died: January 7, 1996 (aged 86); Corvallis, Oregon
- Scientific career
- Fields: Botany, Taxonomy, Plant collector

Harold Norman Moldenke, also known as simply Moldenke (1909–1996) was an American botanist/taxonomist. His expertise was largely in the study of Verbenaceae, Avicenniaceae, Stilbaceae, Dicrastylidaceae, Symphoremaceae, Nyctanthaceae and Eriocaulaceae.

== Early life ==
Moldenke was the son of Charles E. and Sophia (Heins) Moldenke. His father was a noted Egyptologist whose translation of the hieroglyphics on Cleopatra's Needle he reprinted. Harold was born in Watchung, New Jersey, in 1909, and earned a bachelor's degree from Susquehanna University in 1929.

Moldenke's career started at the New York Botanical Garden, a place he maintained a close relationship with (donating many educational materials to its library). There, he worked as a Research Fellow and part-time assistant in 1929. He taught a course in Systematic Botany for gardeners there as well. For 16 years, he worked as the assistant and associate curator under Henry A. Gleason. When Moldenke served in the Civilian Public Service, Soil Conservation Service and as a hospital attendant in Warren, Pennsylvania, he wrote a number of papers on Amazonian curare-producing plants with Boris Alexander Krukoff. These were entitled Plants Strategic to the War Effort. His herbarium is accommodated in the Moldenke Room at the Plant Resources Center.

== Later career ==
In 1941, Moldenke, along with the collaboration of his wife, Alma Moldenke, created the book Plants of the Bible after 12 years of research. Later, Moldenke took a job in botanical and ecological education as director of the now-named Trailside Nature and Science Center in Mountainside, New Jersey. He was also a professor of botany at the now-named Kean University in Union, New Jersey, and taught enrichment courses at Westfield and Livingston Adult Schools in New Jersey. In 1967, Moldenke left Trailside and accepted a professorship at the now-named William Paterson College. In 1984, he sold the most of his herbarium, papers and books to the University of Texas. Moldenke died at Corvallis, Oregon on January 7, 1996.

== Honors ==
In 1969, Moldenke was named an Honorary Life Member of the Torrey Botanical Club. In 1970, he was made Honorary Curator of New York Botanical Garden.
