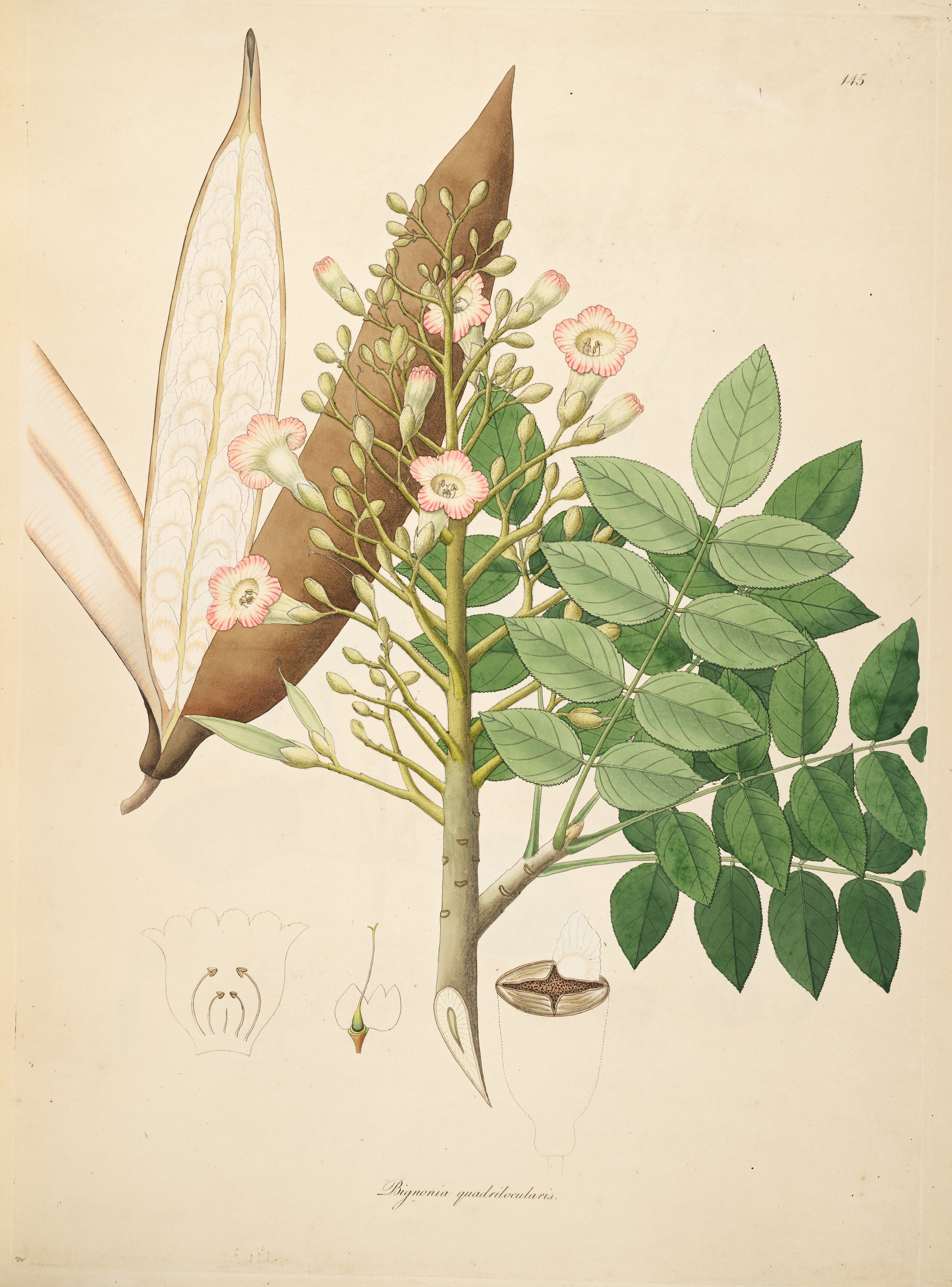
- Heterophragma quadriloculare (Illustration)

Scientific classification
- Kingdom: Plantae
- Clade: Embryophytes
- Clade: Tracheophytes
- Clade: Angiosperms
- Clade: Eudicots
- Clade: Asterids
- Order: Lamiales
- Family: Bignoniaceae
- Clade: Crescentiina
- Clade: Paleotropical clade
- Genus: Heterophragma; DC.

Type species
- Heterophragma quadriloculare (Roxb.) K. Schum.

= Heterophragma =

Genus of plants from Southeast Asia and India

Heterophragma is a genus of two species of tree, constituting part of the plant family Bignoniaceae. The species are found in Southeast Asia and India.

== Naming and classification ==
Heterophragma is part of the Palaeotropical Clade of the Bignoniaceae, closely related to the following genera: Catophractes, Dolichandrone, Fernandoa, Kigelia, Markhamia, Newbouldia, Radermachera, Rhigozum, Spathodea, and Stereospermum; and to the Coleeae clade (which contains Colea, Phyllarthron, Phylloctenium, and Rhodocolea). The Coleeae clade species are found in Madagascar and surrounding islands, whereas the other genera are found in Asia, Africa and Madagascar.

The influential Swiss botanist, Augustin Pyramus de Candolle (1778-1841) named the genus in 1845, in his publication Prodromus Systematis Naturalis Regni Vegetabilis.

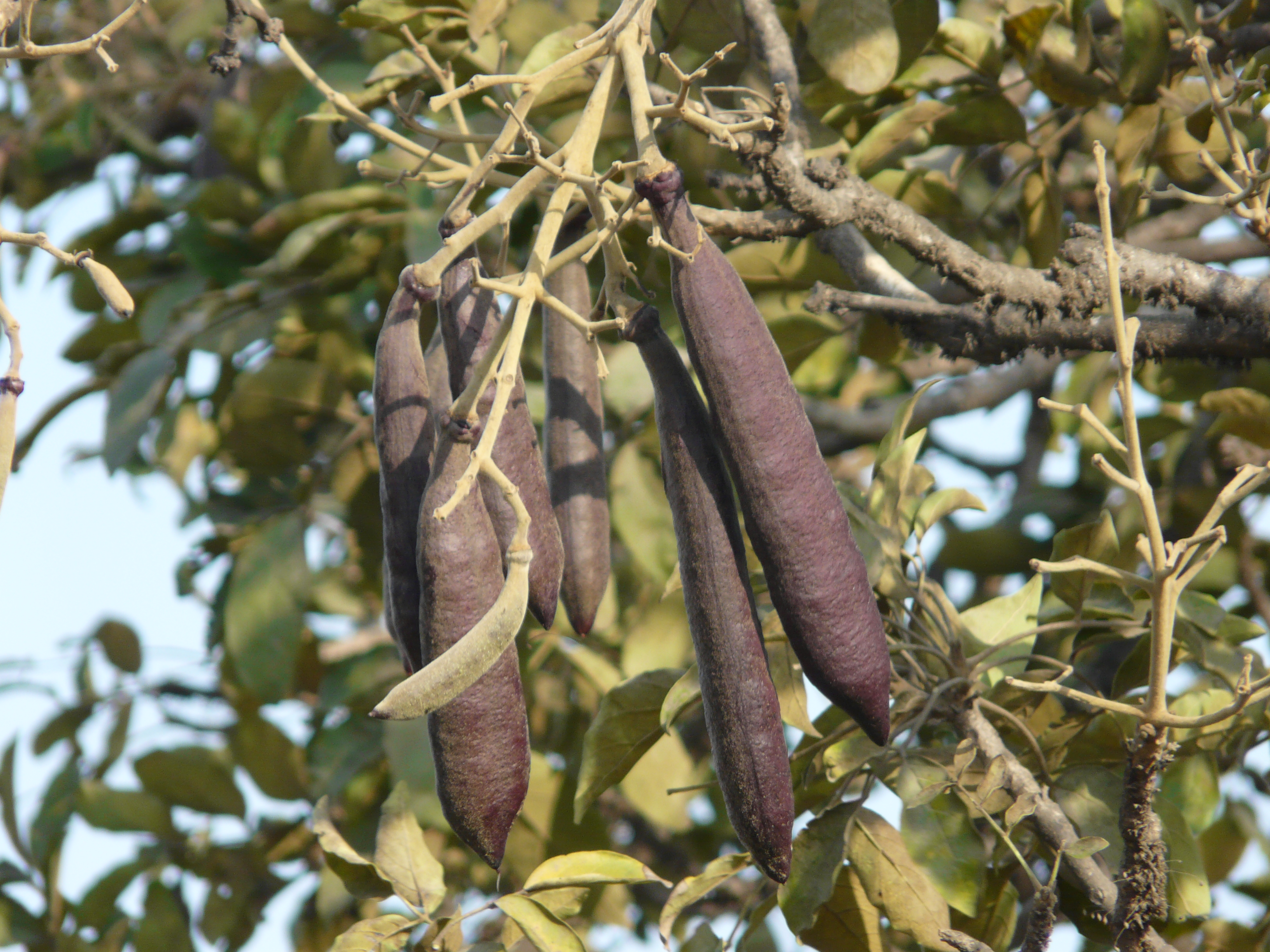
Heterophragma quadriloculare, Fruit

== Description ==
The trees, which can grow up to 20 m (66 ft) tall, have whorled/verticillate arrangement of leaves, which are in three or four pinnate pairs. Upper side of the leaves are hairy/possessing trichomes, which are star-shaped/stellate. Inflorescences/groups of flowers are in terminal thyrses (put simply, in a stalked arrangement at end of branches). Flowers are cream-white to pale yellow. Calyx are tubular and irregularly lobed. Corolla are tubular with unequal lobes, straight, cream-white to pale yellow in colour. The 4 stamen are shorter that the corolla, anthers are hairless, a single staminodium (infertile stamen structure) is adjacent to the stamens. Ovary is elliptical, lacks hairs and has many ovules per ovary chamber. Fruit are long cylindrical pods with woody valves. Calyx is not permanent on fruit. Seeds are broad and possess translucent wings.

== Species ==
- Heterophragma quadriloculare (Roxb.) K.Schum.
- Heterophragma sulfureum Kurz

The following former species have now been shifted to other taxa listed:

- Heterophragma adenophyllum (Wall. ex G.Don) Seem. = Fernandoa adenophylla (Wall. ex G.Don) Steenis
- Heterophragma chelonoides (L.f.) Dalzell & A.Gibson = Stereospermum chelonoides (L.f.) DC.
- Heterophragma longipes Baker = Fernandoa magnifica Seem.
- Heterophragma macrolobum Backer ex K.Heyne = Fernandoa macroloba (Miq.) Steenis
- Heterophragma roxburghii (Spreng.) DC. = Heterophragma quadriloculare (Roxb.) K.Schum.
- Heterophragma suaveolens (Roxb.) Dalzell & A.Gibson = Stereospermum chelonoides (L.f.) DC.
- Heterophragma vestitum Dop = Heterophragma sulfureum Kurz
