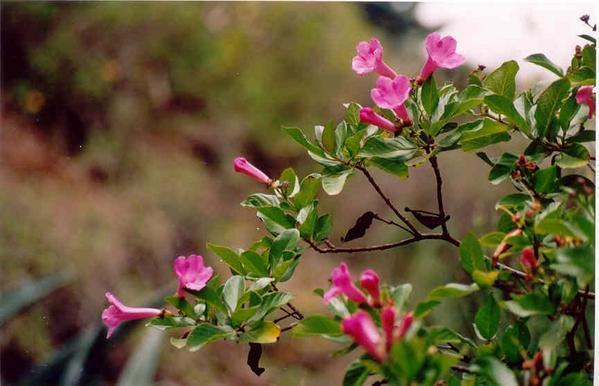
- Flowers and leaves
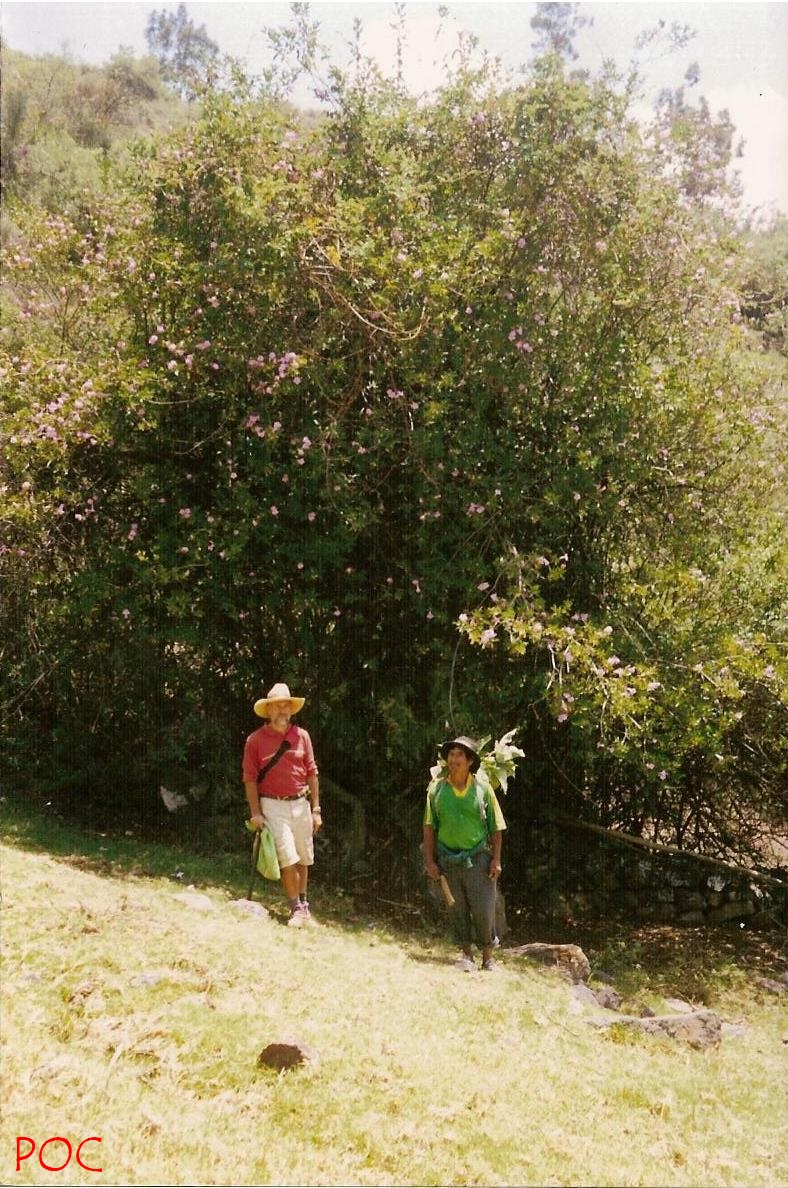
- Habit at 2,600 m (8,500 ft)

Conservation status
- Least Concern (IUCN 3.1)

Scientific classification
- Kingdom: Plantae
- Clade: Tracheophytes
- Clade: Angiosperms
- Clade: Eudicots
- Clade: Asterids
- Order: Lamiales
- Family: Bignoniaceae
- Genus: Delostoma
- Species: D. integrifolium

Binomial name
- Delostoma integrifolium D.Don

Synonyms
- List: Bignonia dombeyana DC.; Bignonia nervosa Dombrain ex DC.; Bignonia simplicifolia Pav. ex DC.; Codazzia nervosa (DC.) H.Karst.; Codazzia rosea H.Karst. & Triana; Codazzia speciosa H.Karst. & Triana; Delostoma dombeyanum DC.; Delostoma hookeri Kraenzl.; Delostoma loxense (Benth.) Sandwith; Delostoma nervosum DC.; Delostoma roseum (H.Karst. & Triana) K.Schum. ex B.D.Jacks.; Delostoma speciosum (H.Karst. & Triana) K.Schum. ex B.D.Jacks.; Delostoma weberbauerianum Kraenzl.; Tecoma loxensis Benth.

= Delostoma integrifolium =

Species of plant

Delostoma integrifolium is a species of flowering plant in the family Bignoniaceae, native to Colombia, Ecuador, Peru, and Venezuela. It is used as a street tree in a number of South American cities.

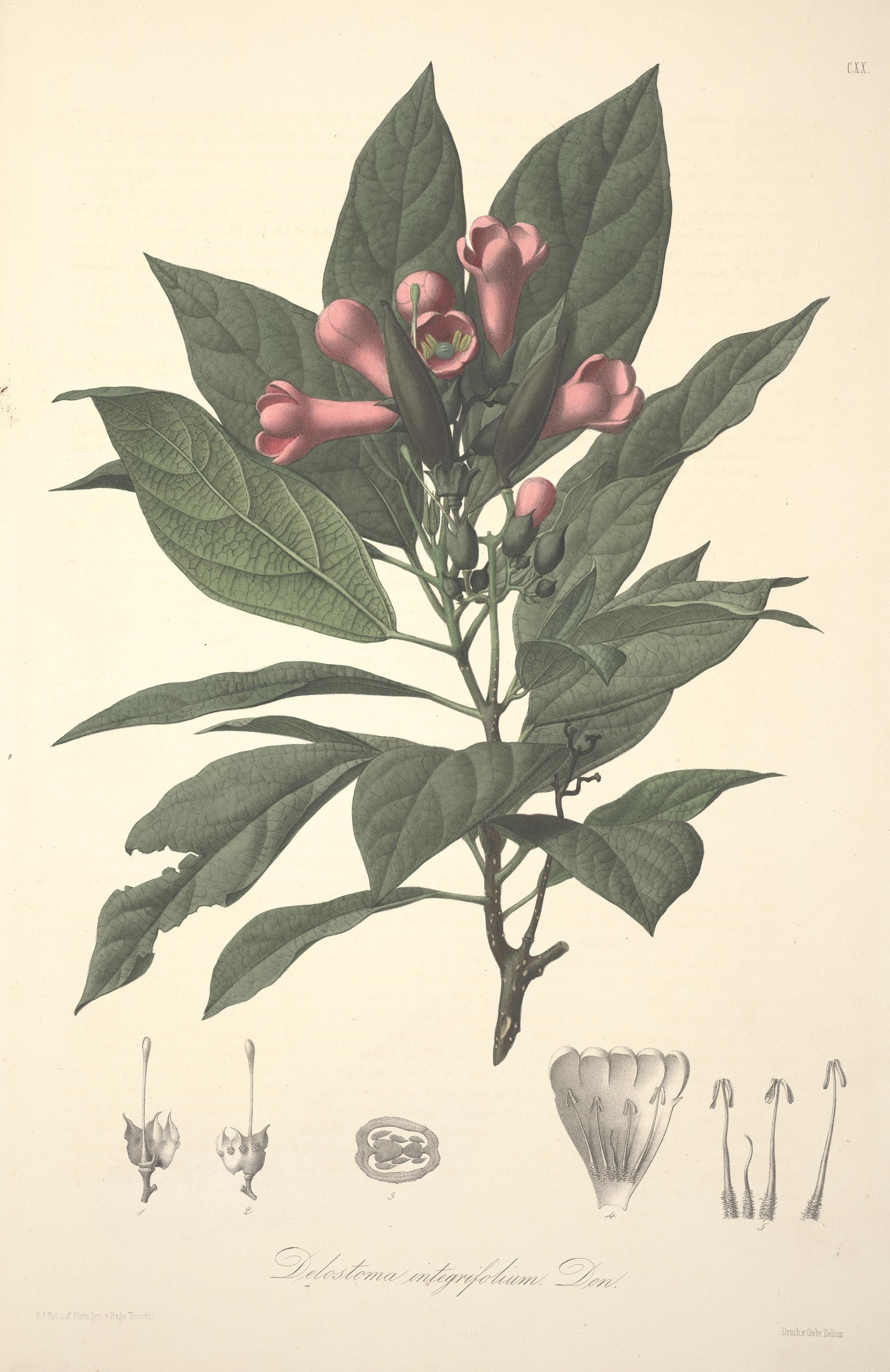
Plate CXX Florae Columbiae. D. integrifolium.
