= Cuspidaria =

Cuspidaria is the scientific name of two genera of organisms and may refer to:

- Cuspidaria (bivalve), a mollusc genus in the family Cuspidariidae
- Cuspidaria (plant), a plant genus in the family Bignoniaceae
