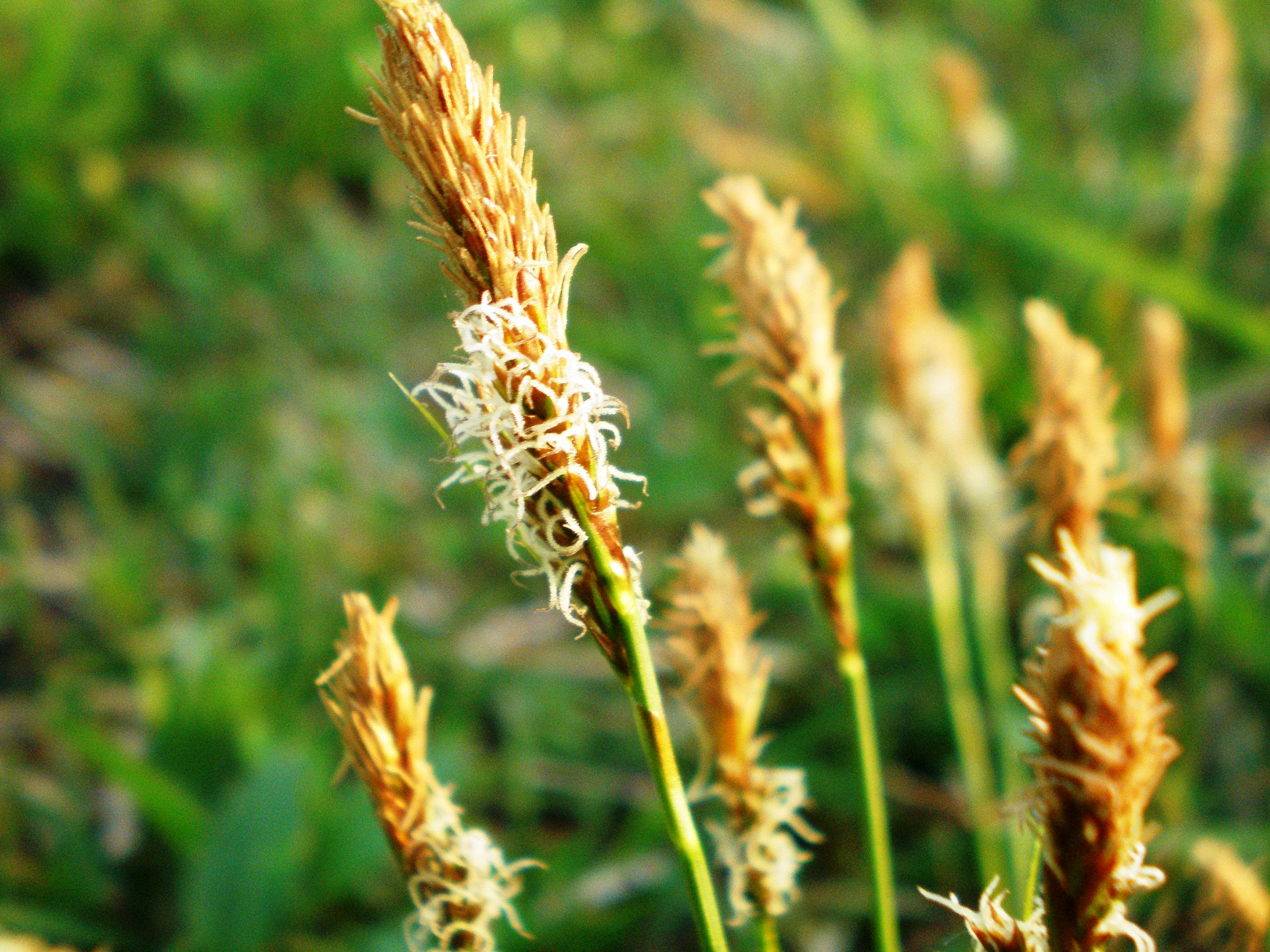

Scientific classification
- Kingdom: Plantae
- Clade: Tracheophytes
- Clade: Angiosperms
- Clade: Monocots
- Clade: Commelinids
- Order: Poales
- Family: Cyperaceae
- Genus: Carex
- Species: C. caryophyllea

Binomial name
- Carex caryophyllea Latourr., 1785

= Carex caryophyllea =

Species of plant

Carex caryophyllea is a species of plant in the family Cyperaceae first described by Marc Antoine Louis Claret de La Tourrette. Two varieties are listed in the World Checklist of Selected Plant Families:

- Carex caryophyllea var. caryophyllea — temperate regions of the Old World
- Carex caryophyllea var. microtricha (Franch.) Kük. — Far East, Korea, North and Central Japan
