= Chilko =

Chilko or chilco may refer to:

- Chilko River
- Chilko Lake, officially known as Tŝilhqox Biny.
- Various plants in Chile and Argentina:

- Some of the Baccharis genus:

- Baccharis chilco;
- Baccharis fevillea, also known as chilca;
- Baccharis latifolia, also known as chilca, chilca blanca or chilca larga;

- Fuchsia magellanica, also known as chilca, chilcón, fucsia or jazmín del Papa.
- Mitraria coccinea, also known as botellita or chilca.
- Astianthus, also known as sabino.

== See also ==
- Nechacco, a paddle steamer re-registered as "Chilco".
