= François Rozier =

French botanist (1734–1793)

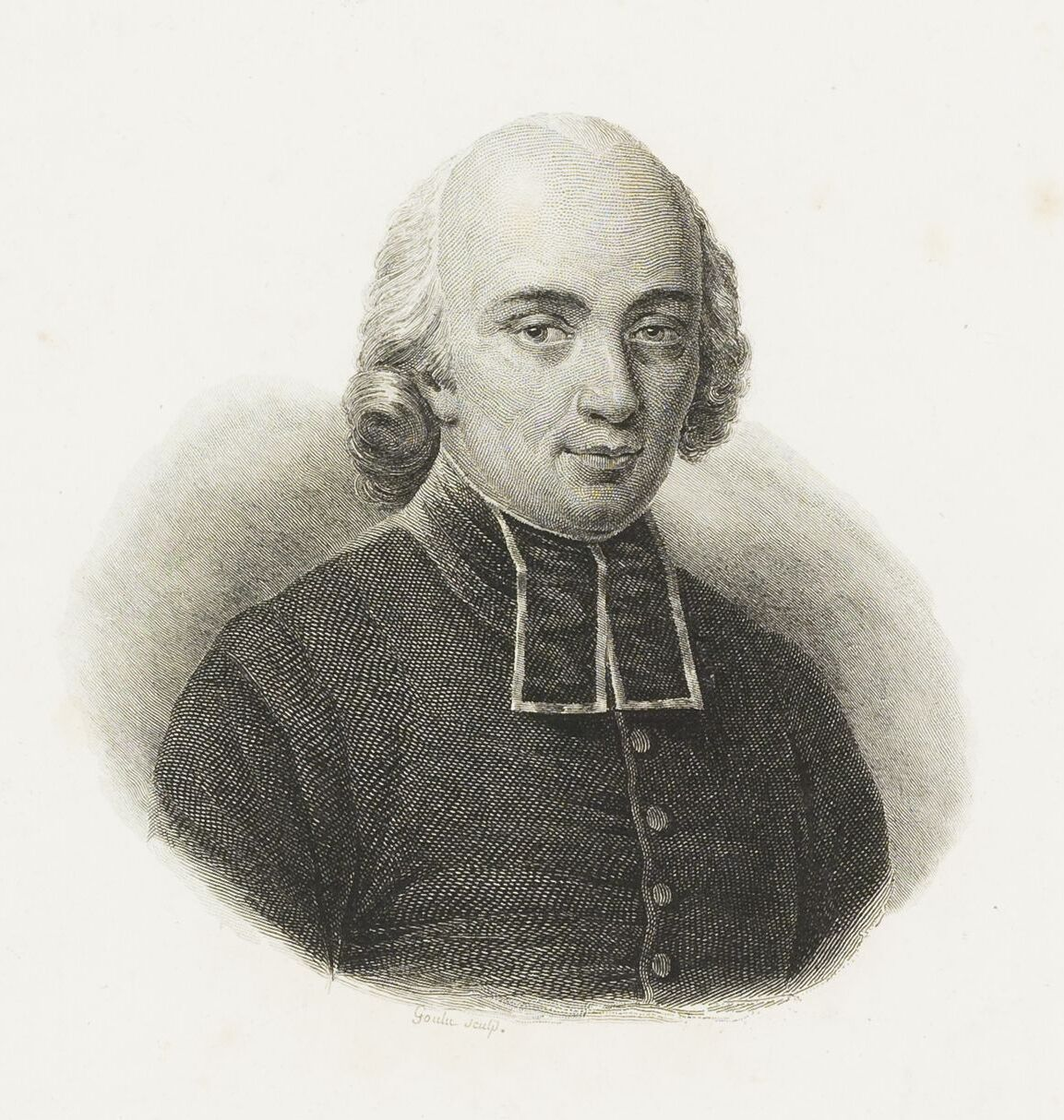
François Rozier.

Jean-Baptiste François Rozier (23 January 1734 in Saint-Nizier parish, Lyon – 28/29 September 1793 in Lyon) was a French botanist and agronomist.

== Life ==
Rozier was the son of Antoine Rozier (a squire, king's counselor and provincial controller for war for the department of Touraine) and his wife. He was a 'knight' (i.e. canon) of the primatial church in Lyon, prior commendatory of Nanteuil-le-Haudouin and lord of Chevreville.

Rozier studied in the Jesuit college at Villefranche-sur-Saône and entered the Saint-Irénée seminary in Lyon. Refusing to enter a more major seminary, he preferred to devote himself to science. He was ordained priest but lacked a vocation and thus became manager of his elder brother's estate in the Sainte-Colombe district on the banks of the Rhône, near Vienne, after their father's death in 1757. He convinced his friends, including Marc Antoine Louis Claret de La Tourrette (1729–1793) and Jean-Emmanuel Gilibert (1741–1814), into his schemes to convert the lands to pasture. He thus met Claude Bourgelat (1712–1779), who set up a veterinary school in Lyon, where Rozier became professor of botany and materia medica in 1761 and set up a major botanical garden. In 1765 he became the institution's teaching director but Bourgelat – who had become the director of the school in Alfort – was offended by Rozier's success and convinced the Bertin ministry to dismiss him in 1765.

Rozier therefore returned to his family lands, where he was visited by Jean-Jacques Rousseau. With his friend Claret de la Tourrette, he wrote Démonstrations élémentaires de botanique, foregrounding the virtues of plants and combining the principles of Tournefort and Linné. He came to Paris to edit the Journal de physique et d’histoire naturelle founded by Jacques Gautier d'Agoty, a periodical of which he became owner in 1771 and which he re-titled Journal d’observations sur la Physique, l’Histoire naturelle et sur les Arts et Métiers. His nephew, abbé Mongez, a noted mineralogist, helped him for a time before joining the Lapérouse expedition.

In 1775 and 1776, Rozier published Tables des Mémoires de l’Académie des Sciences (since its foundation until 1770, in four quarto volumes). In 1775 Anne Robert Jacques Turgot (1727–1781) sent him to southern France to study local produce there in 1777 and to the Low Countries in 1777 accompanied by Nicolas Desmarest (1725–1815) to study windmills. This gave him a steady post and independence that also included a stay in Poland at the court of Stanisław August Poniatowski founding a garden and a chair in botany. In 1779 he became prior of the abbey at Nanteuil-le-Haudouin and began his Cours complet d’agriculture, before returning to Lyon in 1786, where he accepted the post of director of a practical school of agriculture. He also became director of the Pépinière de la Province.

Rozier had a particular interest in wine (he won a prize proposed by the Société d’agriculture de Limoges on the subject for an 8 volume treatise in 1770), in Brassica rapa and in colza (1774). He was admitted to the Académie de Lyon. In 1779 he set himself up near Béziers (domaine de Beauséjour) where he edited his Cours complet d'agriculture… ou Dictionnaire universel l'agriculture, par une société d'agriculteurs (twelve volumes, of which nine were by Rozier himself, 1781–1800). That same year, Rozier was elected a member of the American Philosophical Society. In 1786 Rozier became director of Lyon's agriculture school. He returned to Lyon a few years later and assisted in the early stages of the French Revolution, asking the first two assemblies to create a national agriculture school. He became curé constitutionnel of Sainte-Polycarpe parish in Lyon during the Revolution and was killed in his bed by a bomb during the siege of Lyon. The last two volumes of the Cours Complet were published posthumously in 1796 and 1798. In 1801 his Traité théorique et pratique sur la culture de la vigne, avec l'art de faire le vin, les eaux-de-vie, esprit de vin, vinaigres… was published

== Publications ==
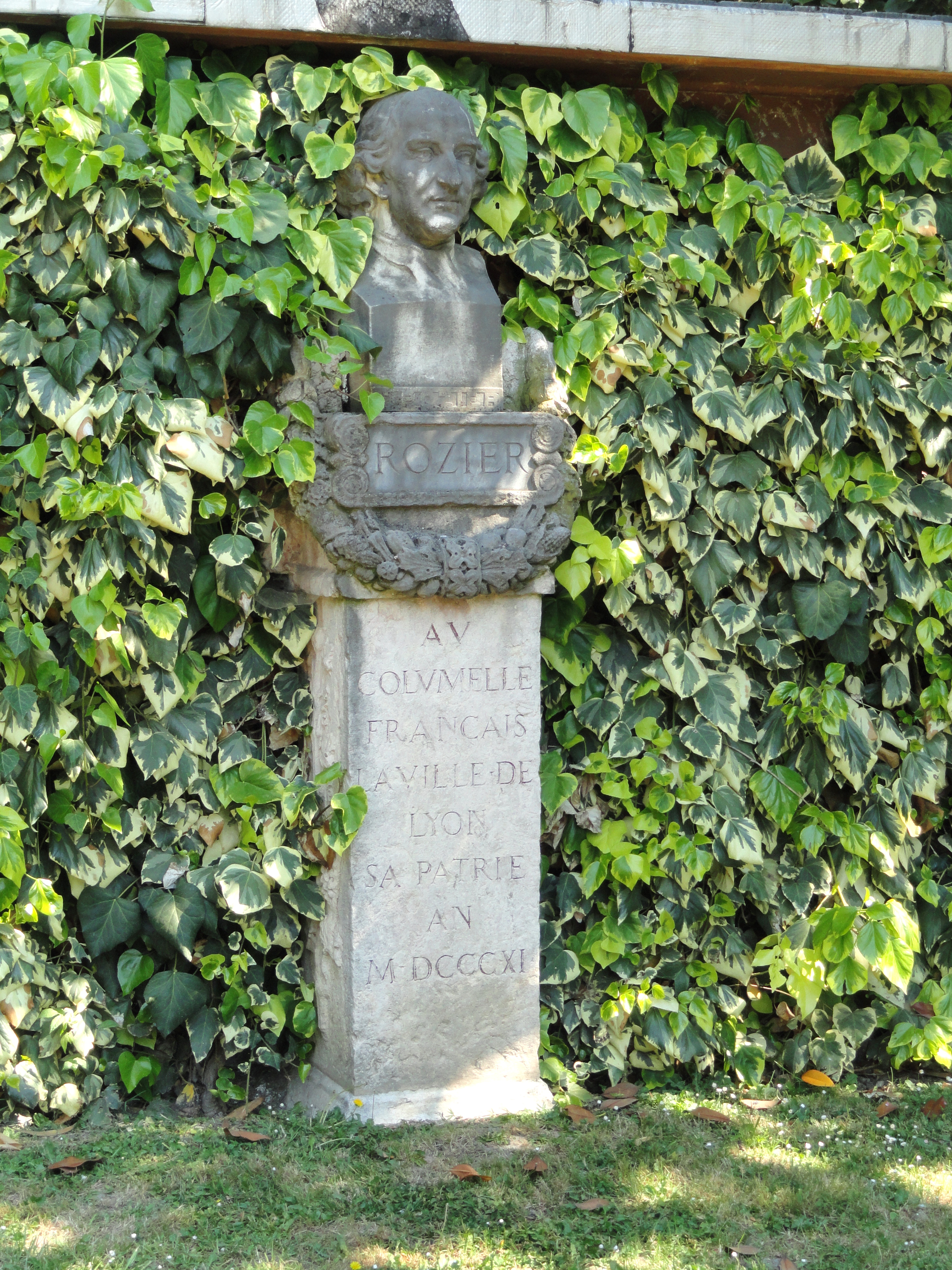
The 'Columelle français' Parc de la Tête d'Or, Lyon Sculpted by R. Benoist Original bust by Joseph Chinard

- with Marc-Antoine-Louis Claret de la Tourrette, Démonstrations élémentaires de botanique, contenant les principes généraux de cette science, l’explication des termes, les fondemens des méthodes, et les élémens de la physique des végétaux; la description des plantes les plus communes, les plus curieuses, les plus utiles, rangées suivant la méthode de M. de Tournefort et celle du chevalier Linné, leurs usages et leurs propriétés dans les arts, l’économie rurale, dans la médecine humaine et vétérinaire; ainsi qu’une instruction sur la formation d’un herbier, sur la dessiccation, la macération, l’infusion des plantes..., 1766; 2e éd., 1773, 2 vol. in-8°; 3e éd. (corrigée et considérablement augmentée), Lyon, Bruyset frères, 1787, 3 vol. in-8°; 4e éd. en 1793, 4 vol.; Lyon, Bruyset aîné, 1796, 2 vol. in-4°
- Mémoire sur la meilleure manière de faire et de gouverner les vins de Provence, soit pour l'usage, soit pour leur faire passer les mers, qui a remporté le prix au jugement de l'Académie de Marseille, en l'année 1770, Marseille : F. Brébion, 1771; édition augmentée, Lausanne et Lyon, L. Rosset, 1772
- Démonstrations élémentaires de botanique, à l'usage de l'École royale vétérinaire, Lyon, Jean-Marie Bruyset, 1773, 2 vol.
- Observations sur la physique, sur l'histoire naturelle et sur les arts…, Paris
- Cours complet d'agriculture théorique, pratique, économique, et de médecine rurale et vétérinaire, suivi d'une Méthode pour étudier l'agriculture par principes, ou Dictionnaire universel d'agriculture, par une société d'agriculteurs, et rédigé par M. l'abbé Rozier, Paris : rue et hôtel Serpente (t. I-VII), chez Delalain fils (t. VIII), chez Moutardier (t. IX-X), 1781–1800, 10 vol. in-4°; les tomes 9 et 10 paraissent après la mort de Rozier; en 1805, deux volumes supplémentaires paraissent (Paris, Marchant, 2 vol. in-4°)
- Nouvelle table des articles contenus dans les volumes de l'Académie royale des sciences de Paris depuis 1666 jusqu'en 1770 : dans ceux des Arts et métiers publiés par cette Académie, et dans la collection académique, 1776
- Traité théorique et pratique sur la culture de la vigne, avec l'art de faire le vin, les eaux-de-vie, esprit de vin, vinaigres, Paris : Delalain, 1801, 2 vol.
- Dictionnaire d’agriculture et d’économie rurale, Nîmes, J. Gaude, 1804, 2 vol in 1 vol in quarto

== Bibliography ==
The standard author abbreviation Rozier is used to indicate this person as the author when citing a botanical name.

- Adrien Davy de Virville (ed.), Histoire de la botanique en France, Paris : SEDES, 1955, 394 p.
- Françoise Dissard, L’Abbé Rozier, second directeur de l’École nationale vétérinaire de Lyon (1765–1769), Thèse de doctorat vétérinaire, Lyon, 1987
- Ruth Janet Severson Haug, "The abbé François Rozier and agricultural reform", in Proceedings of the IVth annual Meeting of the Western Society for French history, 11–13 November 1976, Reno (Nevada), Santa Barbara (CA) : Western Society for French history, 1977, p. 223-229
- Yvette Maurin, "Un agronome en Biterrois : l’abbé Rozier", L’an I de la liberté en Languedoc et en Roussillon, Société archéologique, scientifique et littéraire de Béziers, 1990, n° spécial, p. 13–18
- Douglas McKie, The Observations of the Abbé François Rozier (1734–93), in Annals of Science, vol. 13, numéro 2, June 1957, p. 73–89 (17), Taylor and Francis Ltd.
- Florian Reynaud, Les bêtes à cornes (ou l'élevage bovin) dans la littérature agronomique de 1700 à 1850, Caen, doctoral thesis in history, 2009, appendix 2 (publications) et appendix 22 (biography)
- Antonio Saltini, Storia delle scienze agrarie, vol. II, I secoli della rivoluzione agraria, Bologne, Edagricole, 1987, p. 369–402
- Arsène Thiébaut de Berneaud, Éloge historique de l'abbé François Rozier, restaurateur de l'agriculture française, A. Barbier, 1833, nb p. 92
