= Delostoma =

Scientific classification
- Kingdom: Plantae
- Clade: Tracheophytes
- Clade: Angiosperms
- Clade: Eudicots
- Clade: Asterids
- Order: Lamiales
- Family: Bignoniaceae
- Genus: Delostoma; D.Don

Genus of plants

Delostoma is a genus of flowering plants belonging to the family Bignoniaceae.

Its native range is Western South America to Western Venezuela.

Species:

- Delostoma dentatum D.Don
- Delostoma gracile A.H.Gentry
- Delostoma integrifolium D.Don
- Delostoma lobbii Seem.
