= Lundia =

Lundia may refer to:

- Lundia (plant), a genus of plants in the family Bignoniaceae
- 809 Lundia, asteroid
- Lundia, Finnish furniture company
