= Pleonotoma =

Scientific classification
- Kingdom: Plantae
- Clade: Tracheophytes
- Clade: Angiosperms
- Clade: Eudicots
- Clade: Asterids
- Order: Lamiales
- Family: Bignoniaceae
- Tribe: Bignonieae
- Genus: Pleonotoma; Miers

Species
- See text

Synonyms
- Heterotypic Synonyms: Kuhlmannia J.C.Gomes; Nestoria Urb.

Genus of vines

Pleonotoma is a genus of tropical, flowering lianas in the family Bignoniaceae.

== Species ==
Accepted species include:

- Pleonotoma bracteata A.H.Gentry
- Pleonotoma castelnaei (Bureau) Sandwith
- Pleonotoma clematis (Kunth) Miers
- Pleonotoma dendrotricha Sandwith
- Pleonotoma echitidea Sprague & Sandwith
- Pleonotoma exserta A.H.Gentry
- Pleonotoma fissicalyx B.M.Gomes & Proença
- Pleonotoma fluminensis (Vell.) A.H.Gentry
- Pleonotoma jasminifolia (Kunth) Miers
- Pleonotoma longiflora B.M.Gomes & Proença
- Pleonotoma melioides (S.Moore) A.H.Gentry
- Pleonotoma orientalis Sandwith
- Pleonotoma pavettiflora Sandwith
- Pleonotoma stichadenia K.Schum.
- Pleonotoma tetraquetra (Cham.) Bureau
- Pleonotoma variabilis (Jacq.) Miers

== See also ==
- Data related to Pleonotoma at Wikispecies
