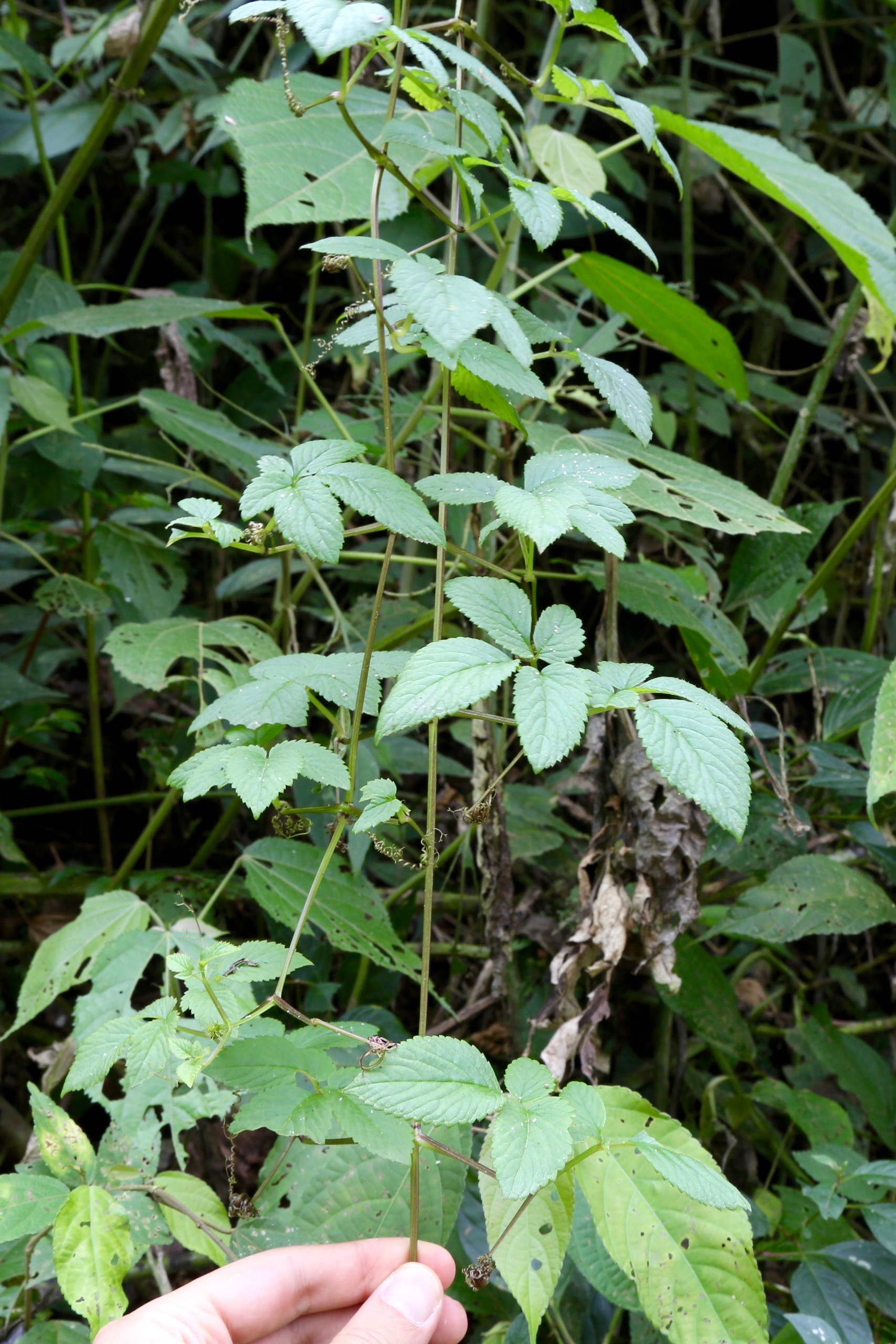
- Tourrettia lappacea

Scientific classification
- Kingdom: Plantae
- Clade: Tracheophytes
- Clade: Angiosperms
- Clade: Eudicots
- Clade: Asterids
- Order: Lamiales
- Family: Bignoniaceae
- Genus: Tourrettia; Foug.

Synonyms
- Dombeya lappacea L'Hér.; Tourrettia dombeya Schreb. ex Forsyth f.; Tourrettia volubilis J.F.Gmel.

= Tourrettia =

Genus of flowering plants

Tourrettia is a monotypic genus of flowering plants belonging to the family Bignoniaceae. It only contains one known species, Tourrettia lappacea (L'Hér.) Willd. The genus of Tourrettia has 2 known synonyms, Dombeya L'Hér. and Medica Cothen. It is also in Tribe Tourrettieae.

Its native range stretches from Mexico down to north-western Argentina. It is found in Bolivia, Colombia, Costa Rica, Ecuador, Guatemala, Honduras, Nicaragua, Panamá, Peru and Venezuela.

The genus name of Tourrettia is in honour of Marc Antoine Louis Claret de La Tourrette (1729–1793), a French botanist. The Latin specific epithet of lappacea is derived from lappa meaning with burrs. It was first described and published in Mém. Acad. Sci. (Paris) 1784 on page 205 in 1787. The species was published in Sp. Pl. edition 4 Vol.3 on page 263 in 1800.
