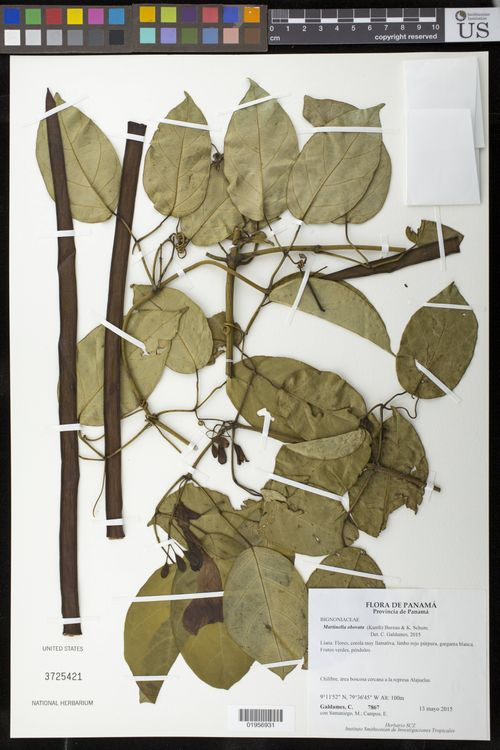
- Martinella obovata

Scientific classification
- Kingdom: Plantae
- Clade: Embryophytes
- Clade: Tracheophytes
- Clade: Spermatophytes
- Clade: Angiosperms
- Clade: Eudicots
- Clade: Asterids
- Order: Lamiales
- Family: Bignoniaceae
- Genus: Martinella; Baill.

Species
- See § Known species.

Synonyms
- Stenosiphanthus A.Samp.

= Martinella (plant) =

Genus of flowering plants

Martinella is a genus of flowering plants belonging to the family Bignoniaceae. It is a genus of Neotropical lianas within the tribe Bignonieae.

Its native range is Mexico and Tropical America. It is found in the countries of Belize, Bolivia, Brazil, Colombia, Costa Rica, Ecuador, French Guiana, Guatemala, Guyana, Honduras, Mexico, Panamá, Peru, Suriname, Trinidad-Tobago and Venezuela.

== Description ==
They are lianas, which has terete (circular in cross-section) branchlets. It has 2-foliolate (pairs of leaflets) leaves, sometimes with a trifid (rarely simple) tendril. The flower is an axillary raceme. Which has a tubular-campanulate (bell) shaped calyx, it is bilabiate (two lipped), or irregularly 3- or 4-labiate. The corolla is magenta to wine-colored, tubular-campanulate shaped and above a narrowly tubular base. It is glabrous to inconspicuously lepidote (covered with small scales) outside. The anthers are glabrous (smooth), the thecae is straight, divaricate (wide spreading). The ovary is linear-cylindric shaped and sparsely lepidote or puberulous (covered with minute soft erect hairs). The ovules (seed pre-fertilization) are (2-)4-seriate (arranged in rows) in each locule (section). It has long, linear flattened fruit capsules (or seed pods) that can be up to 130 cm long. The valves are parallel to septum, they are thin, smooth, with the midline inconspicuous. The seeds are thin, 2-winged, (the wings are membranous), brownish in colour and poorly demarcated from seed body.

It has a chromosome count of 2n=40.

== Taxonomy ==
The genus name of Martinella honours Joseph Martin (d. 1826), an Age of Enlightenment gardener-botanist and plant collector who worked at the Jardin du Roi in Paris. It was first described and published in Hist. Pl. Vol.10 on page 30 in 1888. The genus is recognised by United States Department of Agriculture and the Agricultural Research Service on 9 February 2005, but they only list Martinella obovata (Kunth) Bureau & K. Schum..

== Known species ==
According to Kew,

- Martinella insignis A.H.Gentry ex Zuntini & L.G.Lohmann
- Martinella iquitoensis A.Samp.
- Martinella lanuginosa Kataoka & L.G.Lohmann
- Martinella obovata (Kunth) Bureau & K.Schum.
- Martinella tomentosa Kataoka & L.G.Lohmann

== Uses ==
A root extract from Martinella is useful in the treatment of conjunctivitis and possibly other conditions of the eye.
