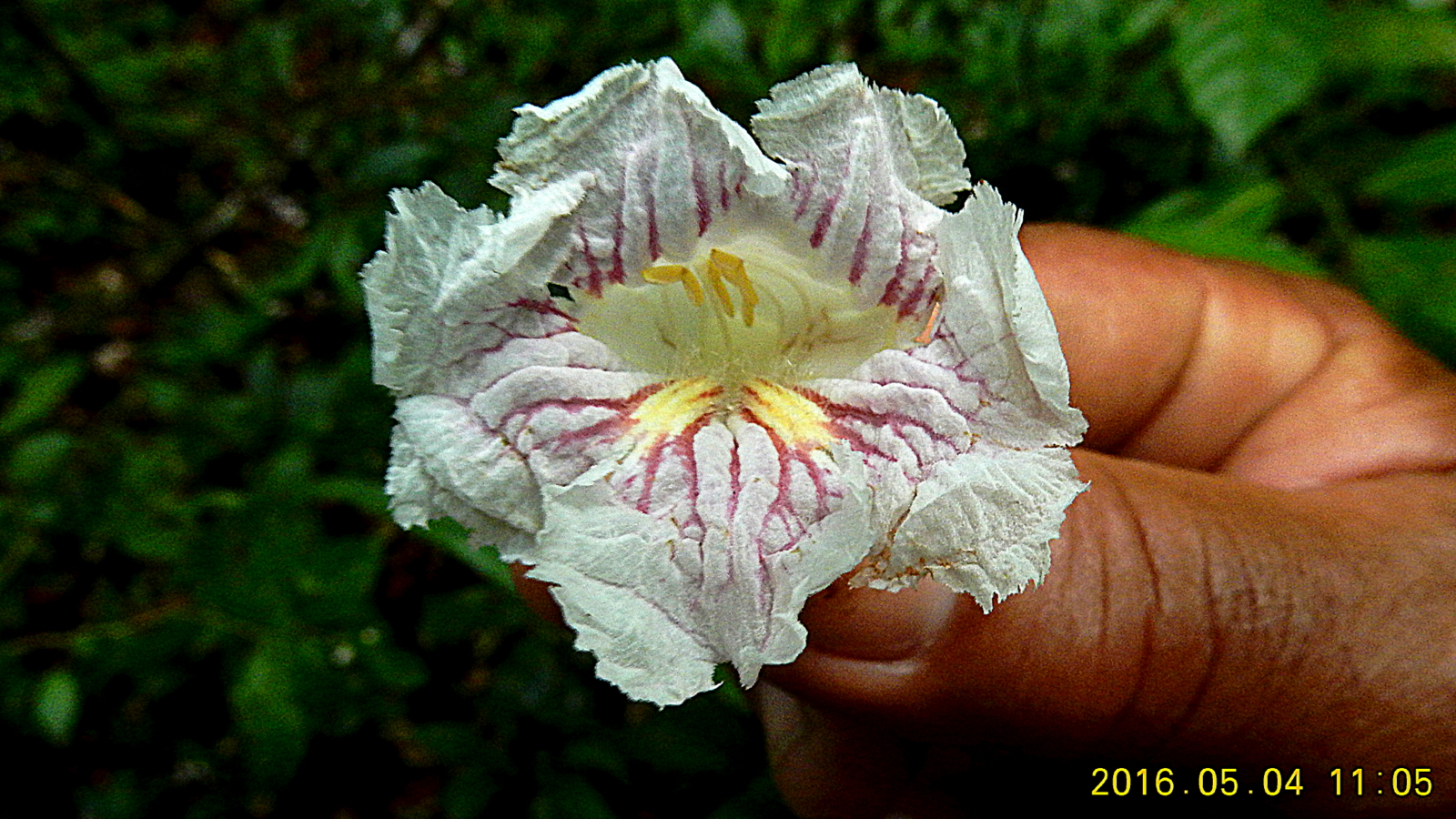
- Sparattosperma leucanthum

Scientific classification
- Kingdom: Plantae
- Clade: Tracheophytes
- Clade: Angiosperms
- Clade: Eudicots
- Clade: Asterids
- Order: Lamiales
- Family: Bignoniaceae
- Genus: Sparattosperma; Mart. ex Meisn.

= Sparattosperma =

Genus of flowering plants

Sparattosperma is a genus of flowering plants belonging to the family Bignoniaceae.

Its native range is Southern Tropical America.

Species:

- Sparattosperma catingae A.H.Gentry
- Sparattosperma leucanthum (Vell.) K.Schum.
