= Paratecoma =

Scientific classification
- Kingdom: Plantae
- Clade: Tracheophytes
- Clade: Angiosperms
- Clade: Eudicots
- Clade: Asterids
- Order: Lamiales
- Family: Bignoniaceae
- Genus: Paratecoma; Kuhlm.
- Species: P. peroba

Binomial name
- Paratecoma peroba Kuhlm.

Synonyms
- Paratecoma diandra Kuhlm.

Genus of flowering plants in the family Bignoniaceae

Paratecoma is a monotypic genus of flowering plants belonging to the family Bignoniaceae. The sole species is Paratecoma peroba.

Its native range is Southeastern Brazil in the wet tropical biome.
