= Romeroa =

Conservation status
- Endangered (IUCN 3.1)

Scientific classification
- Kingdom: Plantae
- Clade: Tracheophytes
- Clade: Angiosperms
- Clade: Eudicots
- Clade: Asterids
- Order: Lamiales
- Family: Bignoniaceae
- Genus: Romeroa; Dugand
- Species: R. verticillata

Binomial name
- Romeroa verticillata Dugand

Genus of plants

Romeroa is a genus of plant in the Bignoniaceae family. Its only species is Romeroa verticillata. It is endemic to Colombia.
