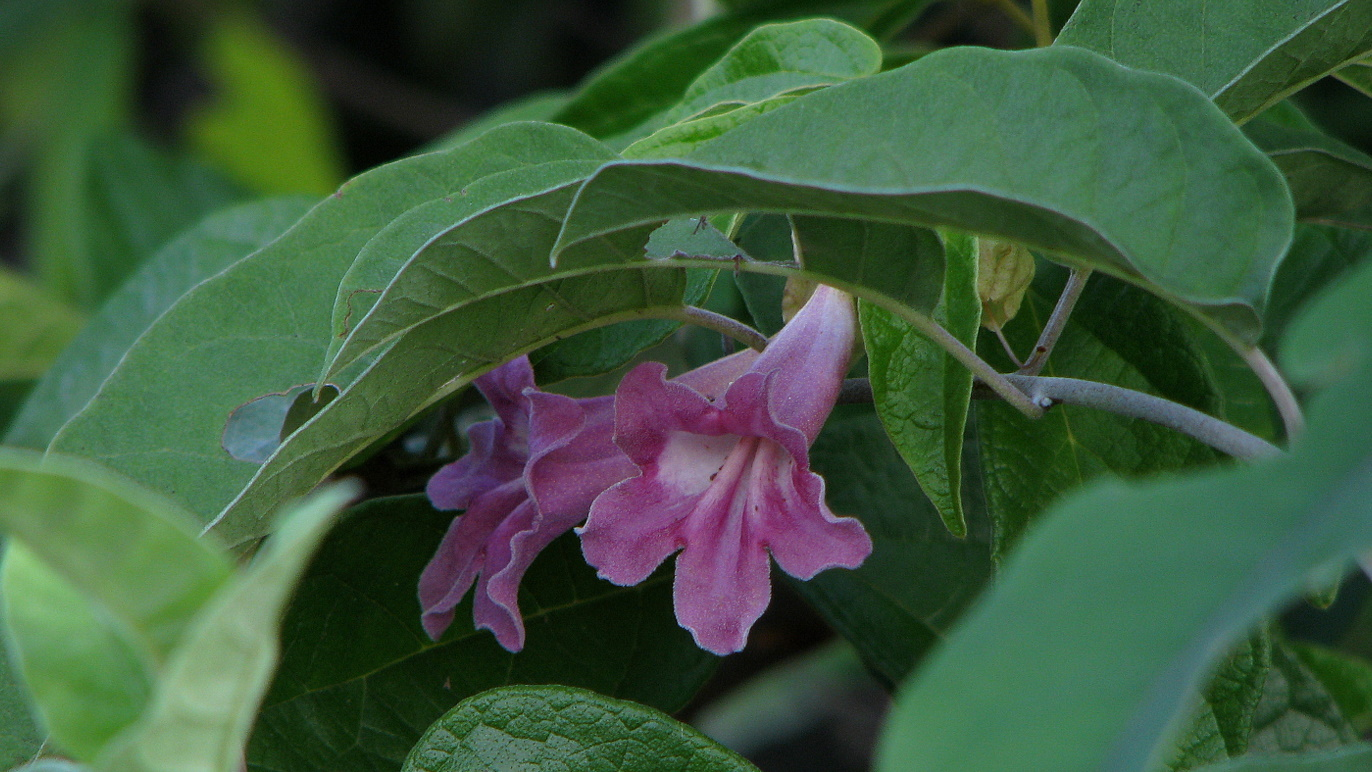
- S. riparium

Scientific classification
- Kingdom: Plantae
- Clade: Tracheophytes
- Clade: Angiosperms
- Clade: Eudicots
- Clade: Asterids
- Order: Lamiales
- Family: Bignoniaceae
- Genus: Stizophyllum; Miers

= Stizophyllum =

Genus of plants

Stizophyllum is a genus of flowering plants belonging to the family Bignoniaceae. Its native range is Southern Mexico to Southern Tropical America.

== Species ==
Species:

- Stizophyllum inaequilaterum Bureau & K.Schum.
- Stizophyllum perforatum (Cham.) Miers
- Stizophyllum riparium (Kunth) Sandwith
