= Callichlamys latifolia =

Scientific classification
- Kingdom: Plantae
- Clade: Tracheophytes
- Clade: Angiosperms
- Clade: Eudicots
- Clade: Asterids
- Order: Lamiales
- Family: Bignoniaceae
- Tribe: Bignonieae
- Genus: Callichlamys; Miq.
- Species: C. latifolia

Binomial name
- Callichlamys latifolia (Rich.) K.Schum.

Species of flowering plant

Callichlamys is a genus of flowering plants belonging to the family Bignoniaceae. The only species is Callichlamys latifolia.

Its native range is Southern Mexico to Southern Tropical America.
