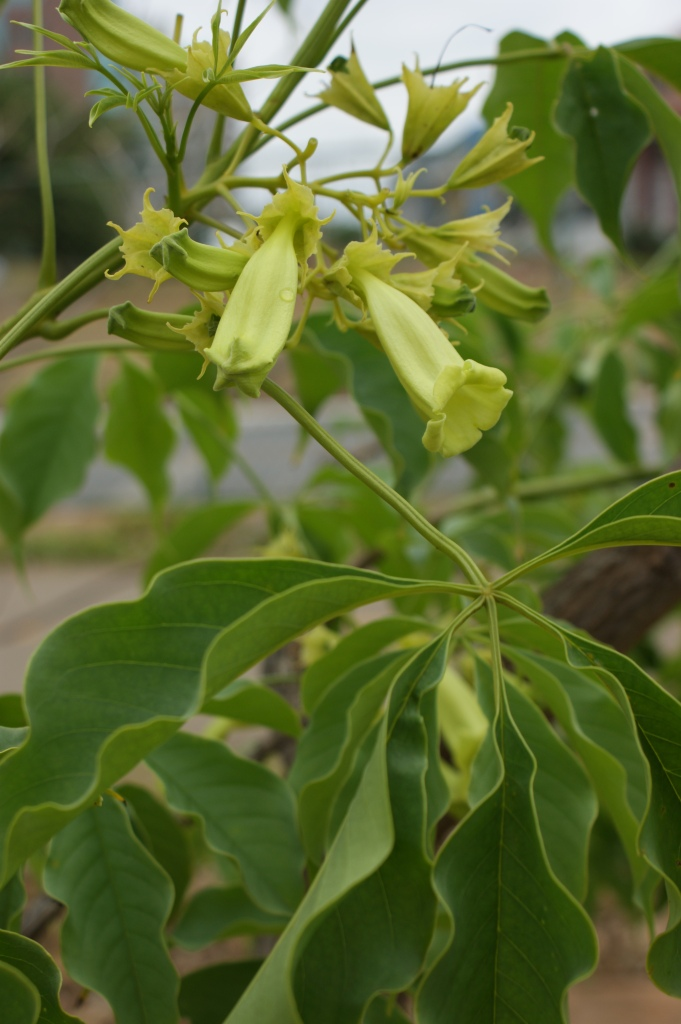

Scientific classification
- Kingdom: Plantae
- Clade: Tracheophytes
- Clade: Angiosperms
- Clade: Eudicots
- Clade: Asterids
- Order: Lamiales
- Family: Bignoniaceae
- Clade: Crescentiina
- Clade: Tabebuia alliance
- Genus: Cybistax; Mart. ex Meisn.
- Species: C. antisyphilitica

Binomial name
- Cybistax antisyphilitica (Mart.) Mart.

Synonyms
- Bignonia antisyphilitica Mart.; Bignonia quinquefolia Vell.; Bignonia rivularis DC.; Bignonia viridiflora Lodd.; Cybistax coriacea Corr.Méllo ex Stellfeld; Cybistax intermedia Corr.Méllo; Cybistax quinquefolia (Vell.) J.F.Macbr.; Cybistax sprucei K.Schum.; Cybistax subtomentosa K.Schum.; Cybistax tinctoria (Spruce) Tittel; Phryganocydia antisyphilitica Mart. ex DC.; Yangua tinctoria Spruce

= Cybistax =

Genus of trees

Cybistax is a genus of trees in the family Bignoniaceae. It contains a single species, Cybistax antisyphilitica, a tree from tropical North and South America.

== Description ==
These semi-deciduous plants have greyish green, opposite, palmately compounded leaves and close-grained, light-colored wood good for furniture. In early spring, the plants bear showy clusters of bright yellow, funnel-shaped flowers 2–2.5 cm wide at branch ends. Pods are 25–50 cm long, straight, pendulous and brown with thin, flat seeds inside. The seeds have papery wings.
