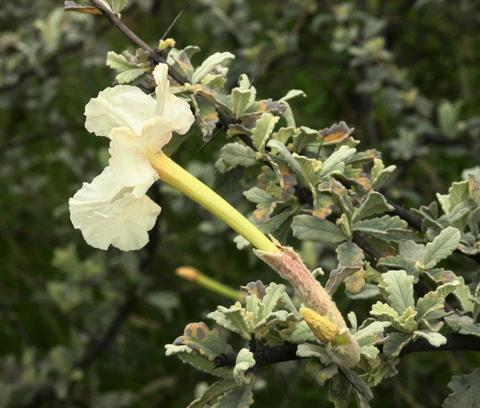

Scientific classification
- Kingdom: Plantae
- Clade: Tracheophytes
- Clade: Angiosperms
- Clade: Eudicots
- Clade: Asterids
- Order: Lamiales
- Family: Bignoniaceae
- Clade: Crescentiina
- Clade: Paleotropical clade
- Genus: Catophractes; D.Don
- Species: C. alexandri

Binomial name
- Catophractes alexandri D.Don
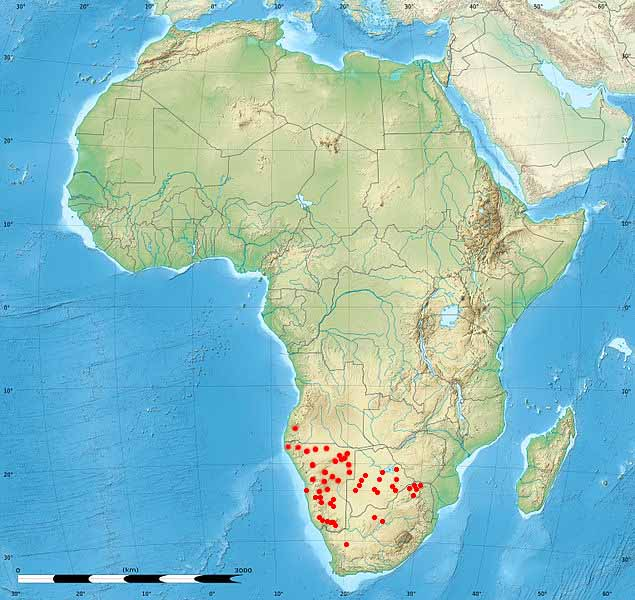
- Catophractes alexandri distribution

Synonyms
- Catophractes kolbeana Harv.; Catophractes welwitschii Seem.

= Catophractes =

Genus of flowering plants

Catophractes alexandri, the only species in the genus Catophractes, is a spiny shrub or small tree up to 3m tall, belonging to the family Bignoniaceae and occurring in the hot, low-rainfall regions of Namibia, the Northern Cape, Kalahari Desert, Botswana, western Zimbabwe and Limpopo. Preferring calcrete, limestone outcrops and soils, the species often forms pure communities, or grows in association with Colophospermum mopane, Rhigozum virgatum, Phaeoptilum spinosum and Acacia nebrownii. It is parasitised by several Tapinanthus spp.

The specific name honours James Edward Alexander, the Victorian soldier and explorer, while the generic name refers to leaves and flowers arising from below the paired, decussate, opposite spines. Leaves are tufted (fascicled) or opposite, and densely tomentose and grey. They are simple and elliptic to obovate, up to 4 cm long, and with coarsely dentate or scalloped margins. The white or pink flowers, produced after rain, are about 10 cm in length, fragrant, showy or specious, 5-lobed, and with a yellow throat. Inside the tube there is a broad, villous band below the origin of the filaments. The calyx is tubular with linear teeth, and slit on one side. The fruit is a flattened, woody capsule, some 10 cm long, warty and splitting or dehiscing across the flat faces into two equal parts. Old fruits are pendant and produce a characteristic clicking sound in light breezes, caused by the castanet-like tapping of the two hollow parts. Seeds are papery and winged.

Descriptions of this species appeared in "Ann. Nat. Hist." ii. (1839) 375;—"Proc. Linn. Soc." i. (1839) 4; "Trans. Linn. Soc." xviii. (1841) 307, t. 22; "DC. Prodr." ix. 233; Kuntze in "Jahrb. Bot. Gart. Berl." iv. (1886) 270; Engl. in "Engl. Jahrb." x. 255; K. Schum. in "Engl. & Prantl, Pflanzenf." iv. 3B, 233.

== Medicinal use ==
The root is chewed for stomach complaints, and when added to the root of Polygala leptophylla Burch., is used as a decoction for abdominal pain, especially in children. Leaf, root and bark infusions and decoctions are used to treat colds and coughs.

== Local names ==
- !khabab - Damara
- Omukaravize - Otjiherero
- Gabbabos - Afrikaans

== Synonyms ==
- Catophractes welwitschi Seem., in Journ. Bot. 1865, 331, t. 39.
- Catophractes kolbeana Harv., Gen. S. Afr. Pl. ed. ii. 276.

== Gallery ==
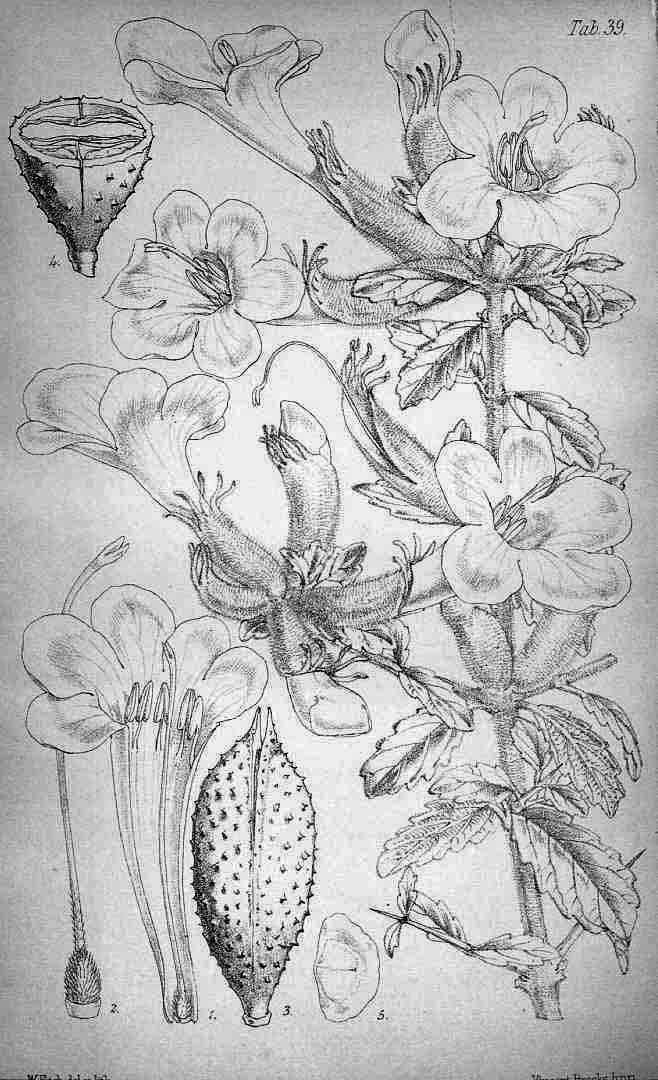
From "Journal of Botany, British and Foreign" (1865)

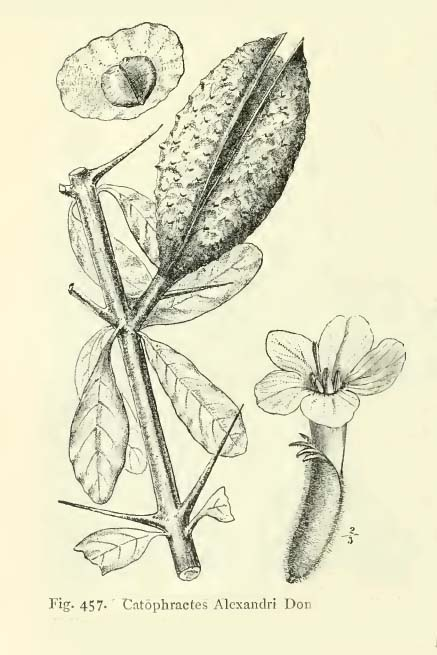
From "Die Pflanzenwelt Afrikas" (1910)

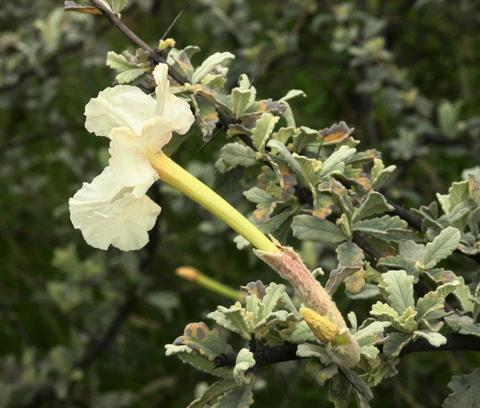
Southern Zimbabwe
