= Manaosella =

Scientific classification
- Kingdom: Plantae
- Clade: Tracheophytes
- Clade: Angiosperms
- Clade: Eudicots
- Clade: Asterids
- Order: Lamiales
- Family: Bignoniaceae
- Genus: Manaosella; J.C.Gomes
- Species: M. cordifolia

Binomial name
- Manaosella cordifolia (DC.) A.H.Gentry

Genus of plants

Manaosella is a monotypic genus of flowering plants belonging to the family Bignoniaceae. The only species is Manaosella cordifolia.

Its native range is Venezuela to Brazil and Bolivia.
