= Lamiodendron =

Scientific classification
- Kingdom: Plantae
- Clade: Tracheophytes
- Clade: Angiosperms
- Clade: Eudicots
- Clade: Asterids
- Order: Lamiales
- Family: Bignoniaceae
- Genus: Lamiodendron; Steenis

Genus of flowering plants

Lamiodendron is a monotypic genus of flowering plants belonging to the family Bignoniaceae. It only consists of one species, 'Lamiodendron magnificum' 'Steenis It is also in the Tribe Tecomeae.

It is native to New Guinea.

The genus name of Lamiodendron is in honour of Herman Johannes Lam (1892–1977), a Dutch botanist. The Latin specific epithet of magnificum is derived from magnificus meaning magnificent. Both genus and species were first described and published in Nova Guinea, Bot., Vol.8 on pages 379-381 in 1957.
