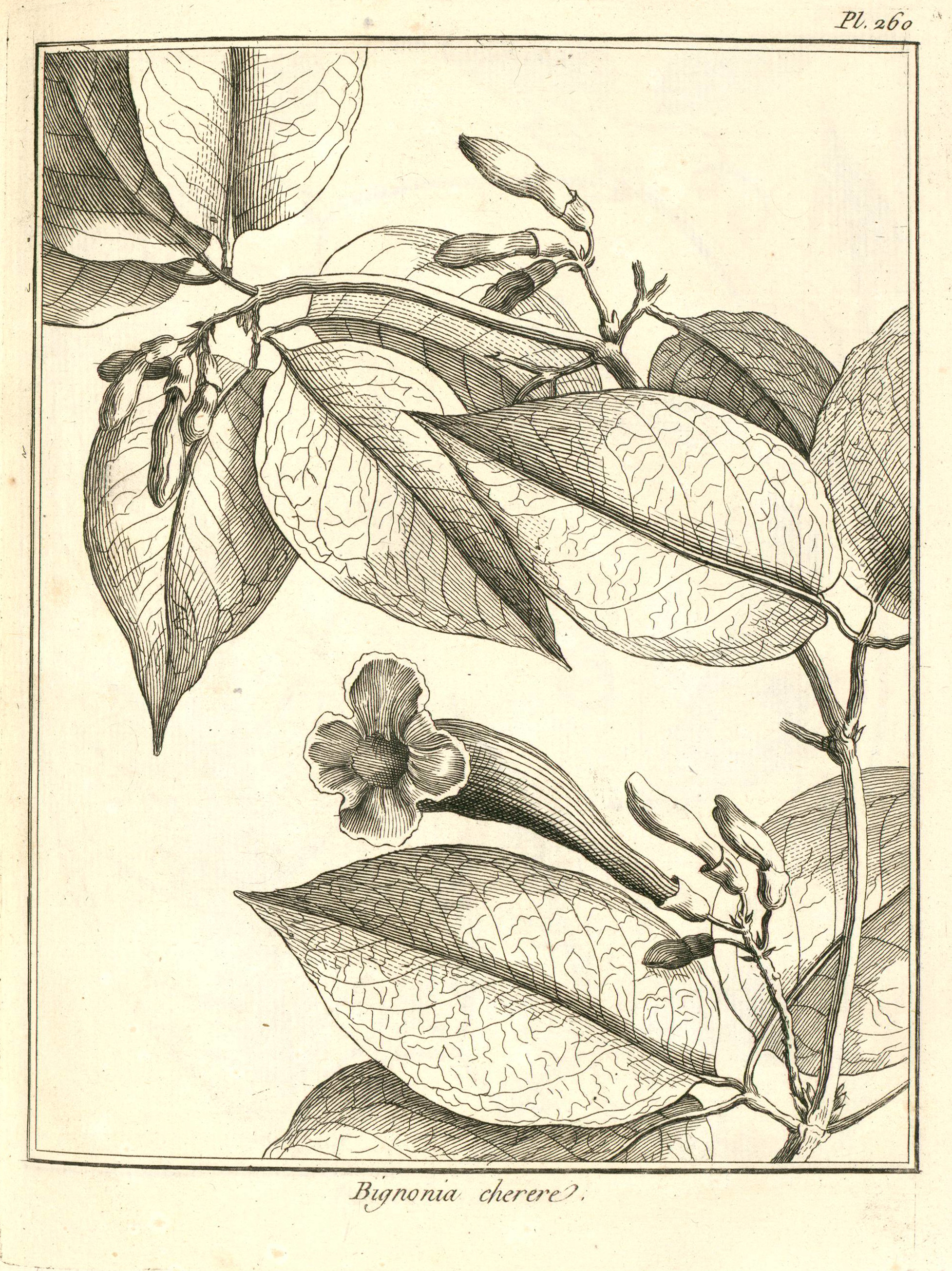
- Pachyptera kerere

Scientific classification
- Kingdom: Plantae
- Clade: Tracheophytes
- Clade: Angiosperms
- Clade: Eudicots
- Clade: Asterids
- Order: Lamiales
- Family: Bignoniaceae
- Genus: Pachyptera; DC. ex Meisn.

= Pachyptera =

Genus of plants

Pachyptera is a genus of flowering plants belonging to the family Bignoniaceae.

Its native range is Central and Southern Tropical America to Trinidad.

Species:

- Pachyptera aromatica (Barb.Rodr.) L.G.Lohmann
- Pachyptera erythraea (Dugand) A.H.Gentry
- Pachyptera incarnata (Aubl.) J.N.C.Franc. & L.G.Lohmann
- Pachyptera kerere (Aubl.) Sandwith
- Pachyptera linearis J.N.C.Franc. & L.G.Lohmann
