= Dinklageodoxa =

Scientific classification
- Kingdom: Plantae
- Clade: Embryophytes
- Clade: Tracheophytes
- Clade: Spermatophytes
- Clade: Angiosperms
- Clade: Eudicots
- Clade: Asterids
- Order: Lamiales
- Family: Bignoniaceae
- Genus: Dinklageodoxa; Heine & Sandwith
- Species: D. scandens

Binomial name
- Dinklageodoxa scandens Heine & Sandwith

Genus of flowering plants

Dinklageodoxa is a monotypic genus of flowering plant belonging to the family Bignoniaceae. It contains just one species, Dinklageodoxa scandens.

Its native range is Liberia in Africa.

The genus name of Dinklageodoxa is in honour of Max Julius Dinklage (1864–1935), a German merchant who collected plants in West Africa. The Latin specific epithet scandens means "to climb". It was first published by Heine & Sandwith in Kew Bull. Vol.16 on page 223 in 1962.
