= Perichlaena =

Scientific classification
- Kingdom: Plantae
- Clade: Tracheophytes
- Clade: Angiosperms
- Clade: Eudicots
- Clade: Asterids
- Order: Lamiales
- Family: Bignoniaceae
- Genus: Perichlaena; Baill.

Genus of flowering plants

Perichlaena is a genus of flowering plants belonging to the family Bignoniaceae.

Its native range is Madagascar.

Species:

- Perichlaena richardii Baill.
