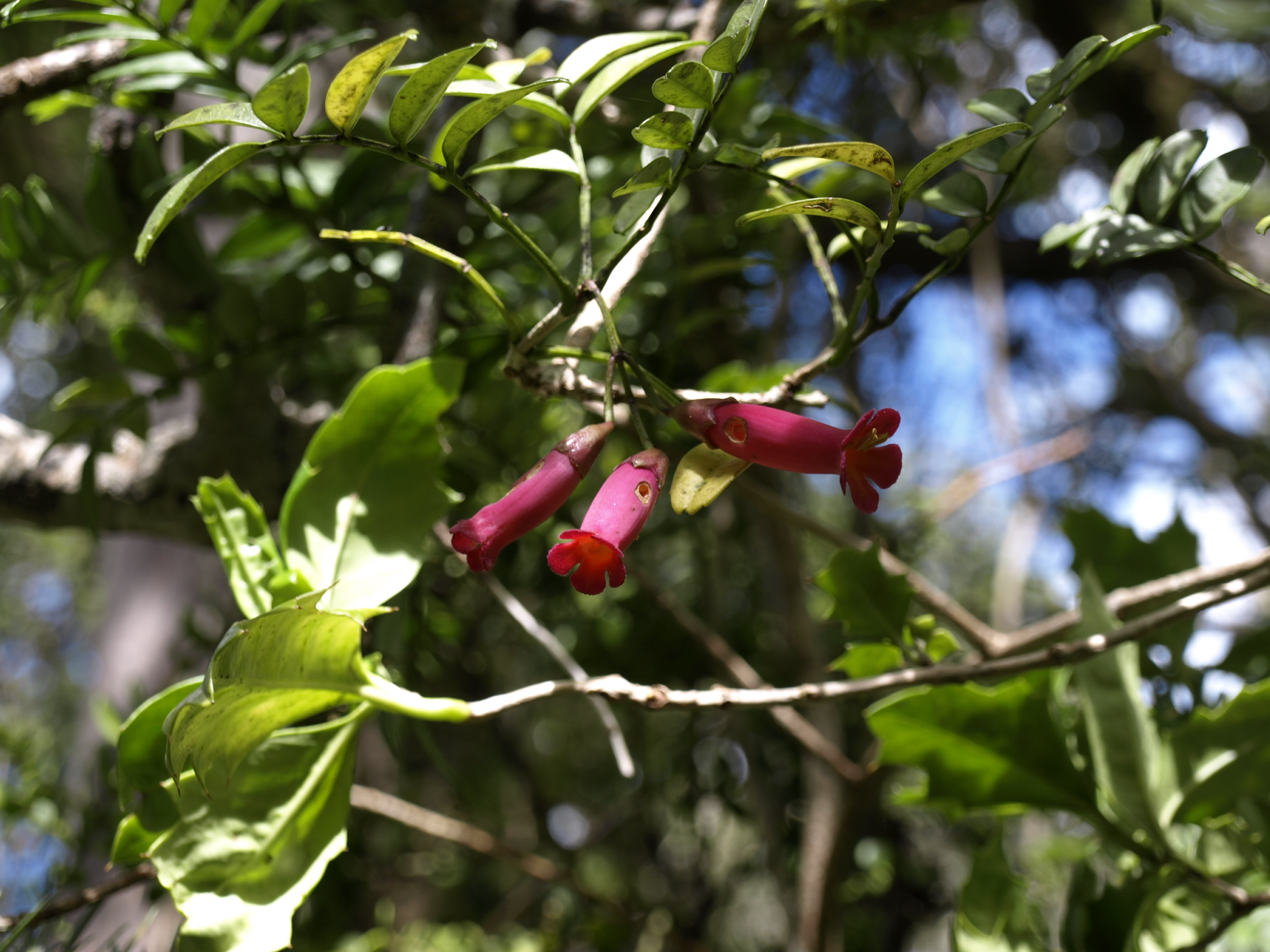

Scientific classification
- Kingdom: Plantae
- Clade: Tracheophytes
- Clade: Angiosperms
- Clade: Eudicots
- Clade: Asterids
- Order: Lamiales
- Family: Bignoniaceae
- Genus: Campsidium; Seem.
- Species: C. valdivianum

Binomial name
- Campsidium valdivianum (Phil.) W.Bull

= Campsidium =

Genus of flowering plants

Campsidium is a genus of flowering plants belonging to the family Bignoniaceae. It has only one species, Campsidium valdivianum.

Its native range is Southern South America.
