= Phylloctenium =

Scientific classification
- Kingdom: Plantae
- Clade: Tracheophytes
- Clade: Angiosperms
- Clade: Eudicots
- Clade: Asterids
- Order: Lamiales
- Family: Bignoniaceae
- Genus: Phylloctenium; Baill.

Genus of plants

Phylloctenium is a genus of flowering plants belonging to the family Bignoniaceae.

Its native range is Madagascar.

== Species ==
Species:

- Phylloctenium bernieri Baill.
- Phylloctenium decaryanum H.Perrier
