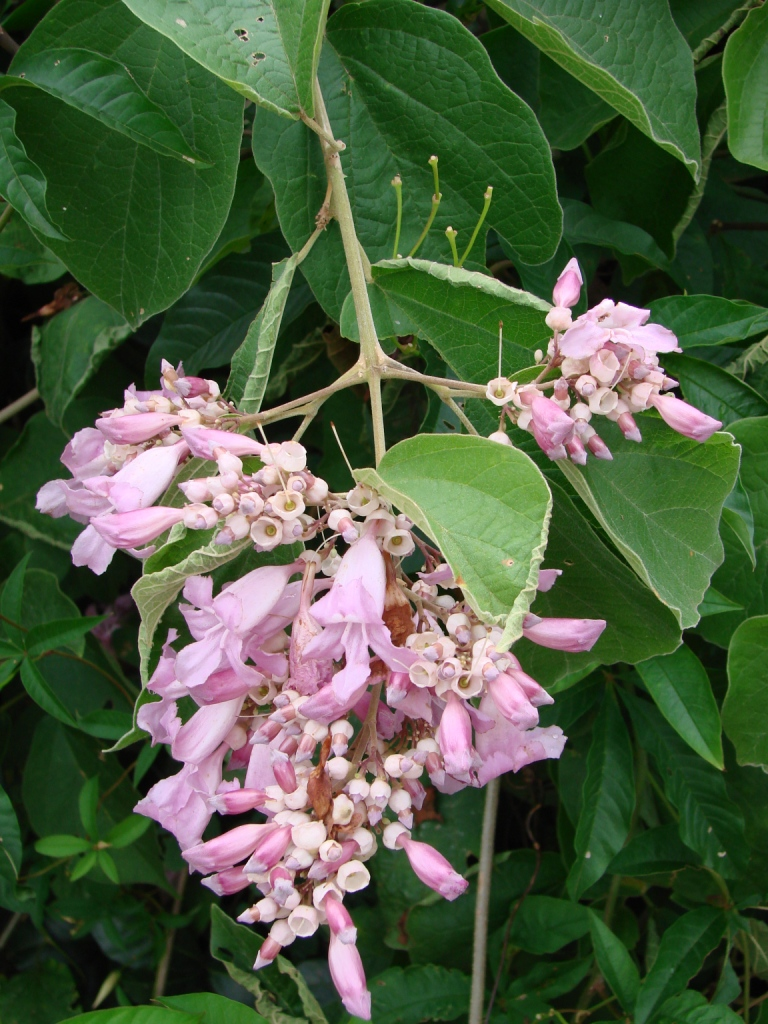
- Cuspidaria floribunda (DC.) A.H.Gentry - Jardim Botânico de Brasília - Distrito Federal - Brasil, February 2011

Scientific classification
- Kingdom: Plantae
- Clade: Tracheophytes
- Clade: Angiosperms
- Clade: Eudicots
- Clade: Asterids
- Order: Lamiales
- Family: Bignoniaceae
- Tribe: Bignonieae
- Genus: Cuspidaria; DC. (1838), nom. cons.

Species
- Several including: Cuspidaria floribunda

= Cuspidaria (plant) =

Genus of flowering plants

Cuspidaria is a genus of plants in the family Bignoniaceae.
