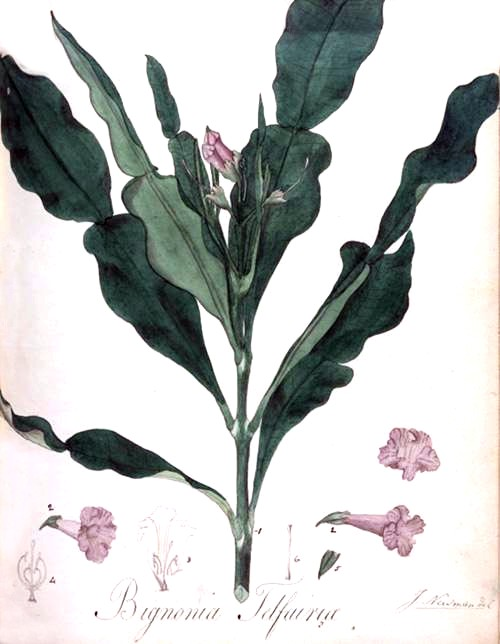
- Bignonia telfairia00.

Scientific classification
- Kingdom: Plantae
- Clade: Tracheophytes
- Clade: Angiosperms
- Clade: Eudicots
- Clade: Asterids
- Order: Lamiales
- Family: Bignoniaceae
- Genus: Rhodocolea; Baill.

= Rhodocolea =

Genus of plants

Rhodocolea is a genus of flowering plants belonging to the family Bignoniaceae.

Its native range is Madagascar.

Species:

- Rhodocolea boivinii (Baill.) H.Perrier
- Rhodocolea compressa (Lam.) Phillipson & Callm.
- Rhodocolea humbertii Callm. & Phillipson
- Rhodocolea humblotiana (Baill.) Phillipson & Callm.
- Rhodocolea involucrata (Bojer ex DC.) H.Perrier
- Rhodocolea lemuriphila Zjhra
- Rhodocolea linearis H.Perrier
- Rhodocolea magnifica Callm. & Phillipson
- Rhodocolea multiflora Zjhra
- Rhodocolea nobilis Baill.
- Rhodocolea parviflora (Baker) Phillipson & Callm.
- Rhodocolea parvifoliolata Callm. & Phillipson
- Rhodocolea perrieri Capuron
- Rhodocolea racemosa (Lam.) H.Perrier
- Rhodocolea ranirisonii Callm., Phillipson & L.Gaut.
- Rhodocolea telfairiae (Bojer ex Hook.) H.Perrier
