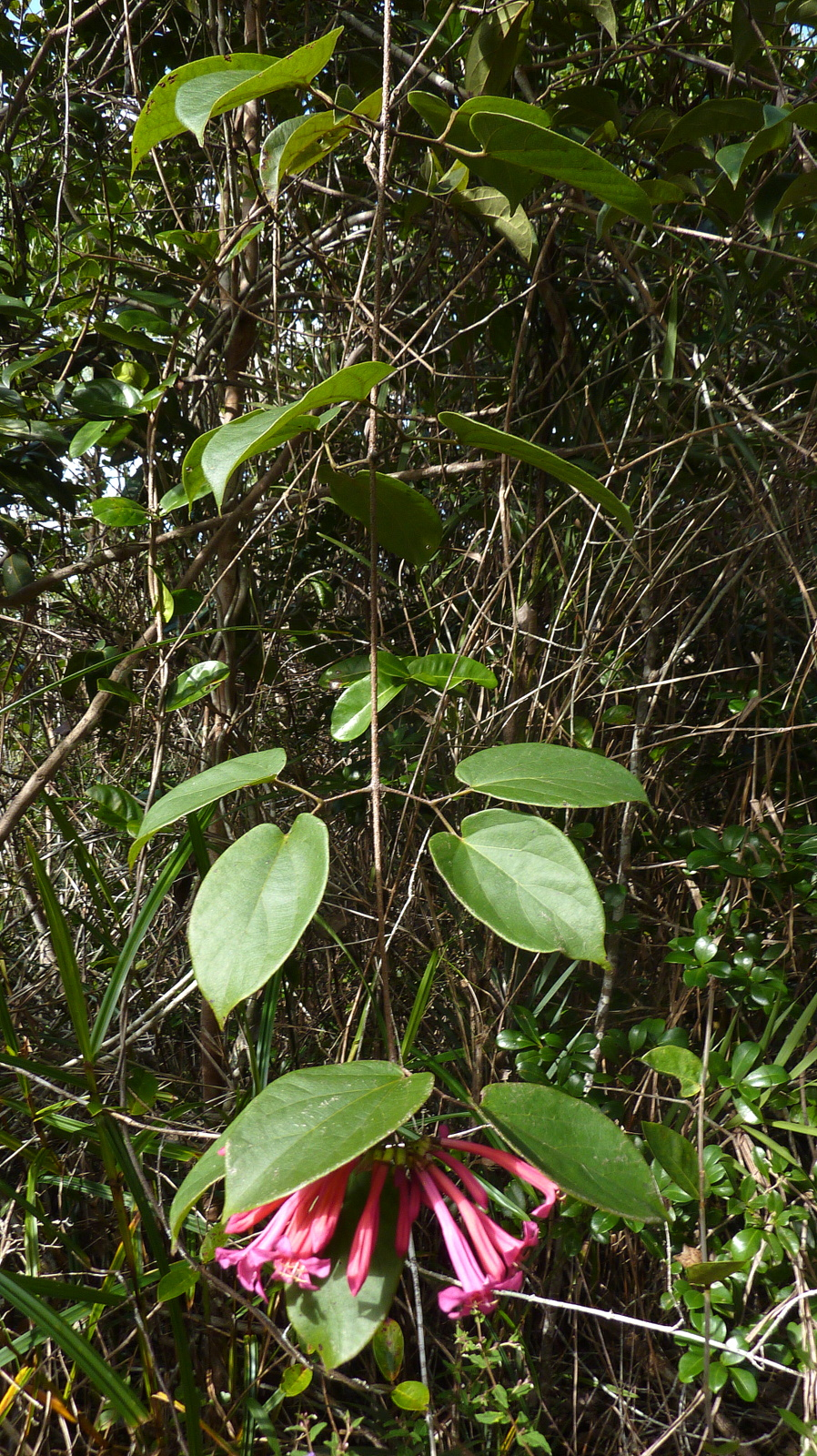

Scientific classification
- Kingdom: Plantae
- Clade: Tracheophytes
- Clade: Angiosperms
- Clade: Eudicots
- Clade: Asterids
- Order: Lamiales
- Family: Bignoniaceae
- Genus: Lundia; DC.

Synonyms
- Craterotecoma Mart. ex Meisn.; Exsertanthera Pichon; Phoenicocissus Mart. ex Meisn.

= Lundia (plant) =

Genus of plants

Lundia is a genus of flowering plants belonging to the family Bignoniaceae.

Its native range is Mexico to southern Tropical America. It is found in the countries of Belize, Bolivia, Brazil, Colombia, Costa Rica, Ecuador, French Guiana, Guatemala, Guyana, Mexico, Nicaragua, Panamá, Peru, Suriname, Trinidad-Tobago and Venezuela.

The genus name of Lundia is in honour of Peter Wilhelm Lund (1801–1880), a Danish palaeontologist, zoologist and archaeologist. It was first described and published in Biblioth. Universelle Genève, n.s., Vol.17 on page 127 in 1838.

== Known species ==
According to Kew;

- Lundia cordata (Vell.) DC.
- Lundia corymbifera (Vahl) Sandwith
- Lundia damazioi C.DC.
- Lundia densiflora DC.
- Lundia erionema DC.
- Lundia gardneri Sandwith
- Lundia glazioviana Kraenzl.
- Lundia helicocalyx A.H.Gentry
- Lundia laevis Kaehler
- Lundia nitidula DC.
- Lundia obliqua Sond.
- Lundia puberula Pittier
- Lundia spruceana Bureau
- Lundia virginalis DC.
