= Marc Antoine Louis Claret de La Tourrette =

French botanist (1729–1793)

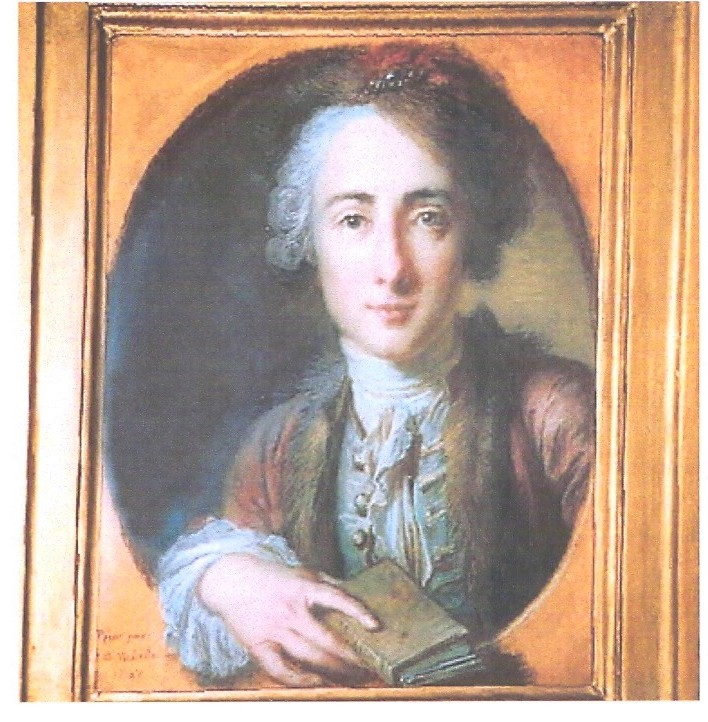
Marc-Antoine Louis Claret de la Tourrette

Marc Antoine Louis Claret de La Tourrette (French pronunciation: [maʁk ɑ̃twan lwi klaʁɛ də la tuʁɛt]; 11 August 1729, in Lyon – 1 October 1793, in Lyon) was a French botanist. He corresponded with Rousseau and his official botanical abbreviation is Latourr.

== Family ==
His father, Jacques-Annibal Claret de La Tourrette (1692–1776), belonged to Lyon's magistrature and was ennobled by Louis XV, and Marc's brother was the navigator Charles Pierre Claret de Fleurieu.

== Life ==
In 1770 he published his Voyage au mont Pilat dans la province du Lyonnais, contenant des observations sur l'histoire naturelle de cette montagne. In this book he described the natural history of the Pilat massif and gave a list of the plants found there.

In 1787, botanist Auguste Denis Fougeroux de Bondaroy published Tourrettia, which is a genus of flowering plants from South America, belonging to the family Bignoniaceae. It was named in Marc Antoine Louis Claret de La Tourrette's honor.

He died at Lyon.

== Works ==
- Voyage au mont Pilat dans la province du Lyonnais, contenant des observations sur l'histoire naturelle de cette montagne, & des lieux circonvoisins; suivi du catalogue raisonné des plantes qui y croissent. (Regnault, Avignon, 1770).
- Démonstrations élémentaires de botanique. (Chez Jean-Marie Bruyset, Lyon, 1773).

The standard author abbreviation Latourr. is used to indicate this person as the author when citing a botanical name.
