= Colea =

Scientific classification
- Kingdom: Plantae
- Clade: Tracheophytes
- Clade: Angiosperms
- Clade: Eudicots
- Clade: Asterids
- Order: Lamiales
- Family: Bignoniaceae
- Genus: Colea; Bojer ex Meisn.

Synonyms
- Ophiocolea H.Perrier

Genus of flowering plants

Colea is a genus of flowering plants belonging to the family Bignoniaceae.

Its native range is Western Indian Ocean, especially Madagascar.

Species:

- Colea alata H.Perrier
- Colea alba H.Perrier
- Colea ambrensis (Callm. & Phillipson) Callm., Phillipson & Buerki
- Colea asperrima H.Perrier
- Colea barbatula H.Perrier
- Colea bernieri Baill. ex H.Perrier
- Colea campenonii H.Perrier
- Colea colei (Bojer ex Hook.) M.L.Green
- Colea comorensis (H.Perrier) Callm., Phillipson & Buerki
- Colea concinna Baker
- Colea darainensis (Callm., Phillipson & Nusb.) Callm., Phillipson & Buerki
- Colea decaryi (H.Perrier) Callm., Phillipson & Buerki
- Colea delphinensis (H.Perrier) Callm., Phillipson & Buerki
- Colea floribunda Bojer
- Colea fusca H.Perrier
- Colea gentryi Zjhra
- Colea hirsuta Aug.DC.
- Colea labatii Callm. & Phillipson
- Colea lantziana Baill.
- Colea lutescens H.Perrier
- Colea muricata H.Perrier
- Colea myriaptera H.Perrier
- Colea nana H.Perrier
- Colea obtusifolia DC.
- Colea pauciflora (Callm., Phillipson & Nusb.) Callm., Phillipson & Buerki
- Colea purpurascens Seem.
- Colea ratovosonii (Callm. & Phillipson) Callm., Phillipson & Buerki
- Colea resupinata Zjhra
- Colea rosea Zjhra
- Colea rubra H.Perrier
- Colea seychellarum Seem.
- Colea sytsmae Zjhra
- Colea tetragona DC.
- Colea unifoliolata Callm. & Phillipson
- Colea velutina (H.Perrier) Callm., Phillipson & Buerki
