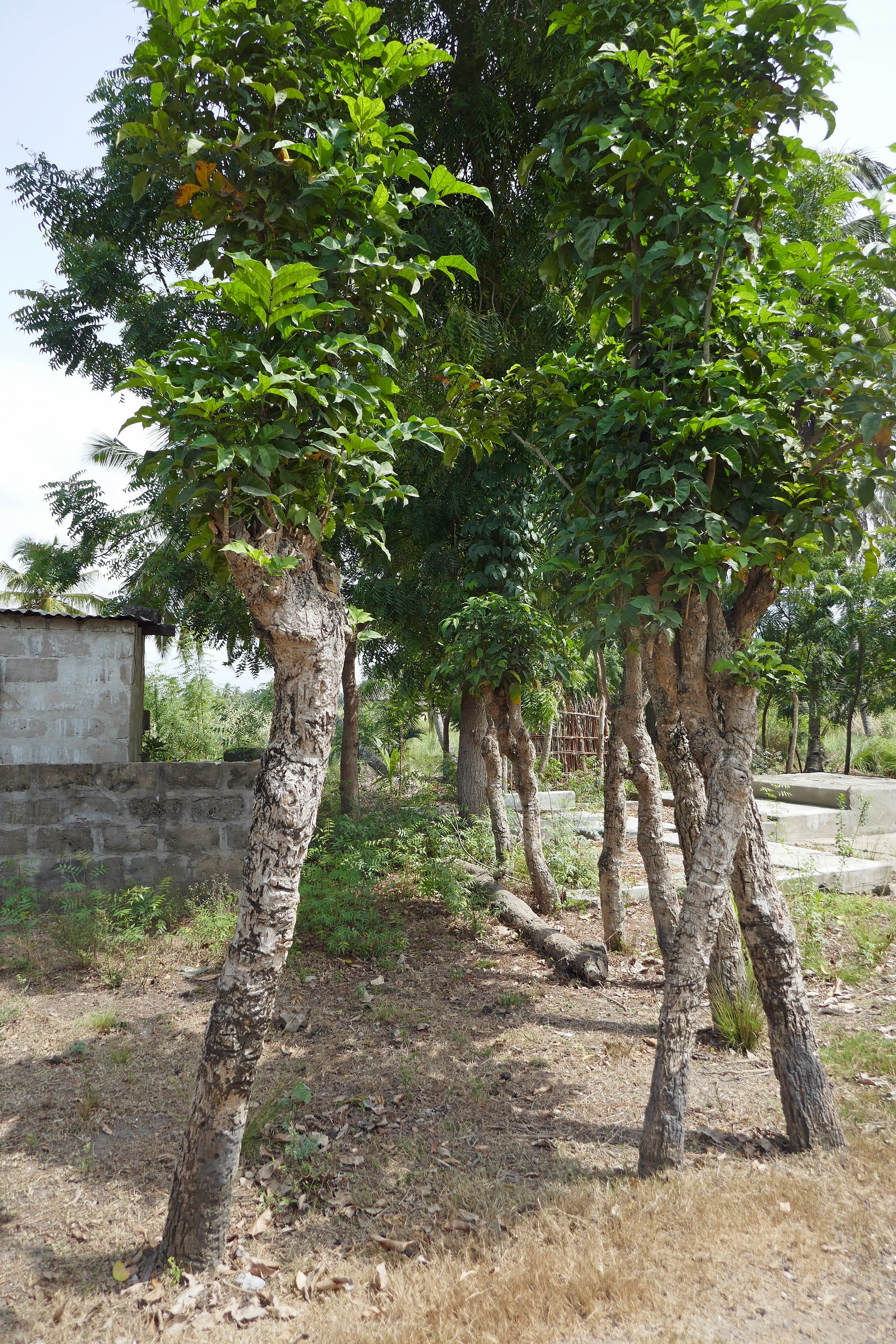
- Newbouldia laevis

Scientific classification
- Kingdom: Plantae
- Clade: Tracheophytes
- Clade: Angiosperms
- Clade: Eudicots
- Clade: Asterids
- Order: Lamiales
- Family: Bignoniaceae
- Clade: Crescentiina
- Clade: Paleotropical clade
- Genus: Newbouldia; Seem. ex Bureau
- Species: N. laevis

Binomial name
- Newbouldia laevis (P.Beauv.) Seem. ex Bureau

= Newbouldia =

Genus of flowering plants

Newbouldia is a genus of plants in the family Bignoniaceae native to Africa. It is a monotypic genus consisting of the species Newbouldia laevis (common name: boundary tree).

The tree has a wide distribution across West and Central Africa. It is often planted as a boundary marker. It also has various medicinal uses.

It is called ewe Akoko in Yoruba people of west Africa and Ogilisi by the Igbo people.

It is named after William Williamson Newbould.
