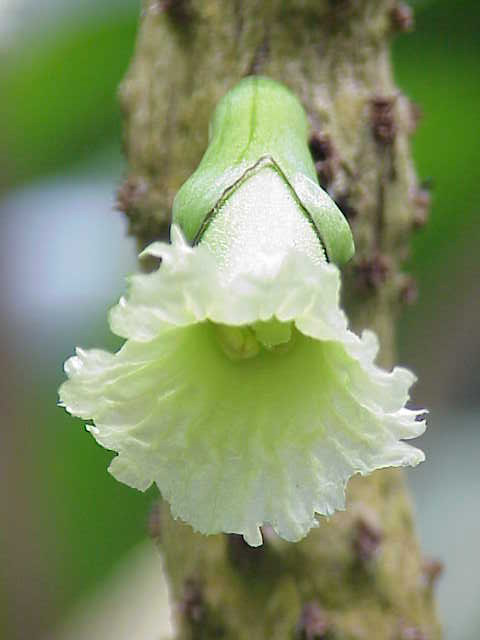
- Bigleaf black calabash (Amphitecna macrophylla)

Scientific classification
- Kingdom: Plantae
- Clade: Tracheophytes
- Clade: Angiosperms
- Clade: Eudicots
- Clade: Asterids
- Order: Lamiales
- Family: Bignoniaceae; Juss.

Type genus
- Bignonia L.

Monophyletic groups
- Jacarandeae; Tourrettieae; Tecomeae; Delostoma; Bignonieae; Oroxyleae; Crescentiina (Tabebuia alliance, Paleotropical clade); incertae sedis: Astianthus

Synonyms
- Crescentiaceae Dumortier

= Bignoniaceae =

Bignoniaceae Temporal range: Ypresian-Recent

Family of flowering plants

Bignoniaceae (/bɪɡˌnoʊniˈeɪsiiː/) is a family of flowering plants in the order Lamiales commonly known as the bignonias or trumpet vines. It is not known to which of the other families in the order it is most closely related.

Nearly all of the Bignoniaceae are woody plants, but a few are subwoody, either as vines or subshrubs. A few more are herbaceous plants of high-elevation montane habitats, in three exclusively herbaceous genera: Tourrettia, Argylia, and Incarvillea. The family includes many lianas, climbing by tendrils, by twining, or rarely, by aerial roots. The largest tribe in the family, called Bignonieae, consists mostly of lianas and is noted for its unique wood anatomy.

The family has a nearly cosmopolitan distribution, but is mostly tropical, with a few species native to the temperate zones. Its greatest diversity is in northern South America. The family has been covered in some major floristic projects, such as Flora of China, Flora Malesiana, and Flora Neotropica. It has not yet been covered in some others, such as Flora of Australia, and Flora of North America.

Bignoniaceae are most noted for ornamentals, such as Jacaranda, Tabebuia and Spathodea, grown for their conspicuous, tubular flowers. A great many species are known in cultivation. Various other uses have been made of members of this family. Several species were of great importance to the indigenous peoples of the American tropics. Fridericia elegans, Tanaecium bilabiata, and Tanaecium excitosum are poisonous to livestock and have caused severe losses.

According to different accounts, the number of species in the family is about 810 or about 860. The last monograph of the entire family was published in 2004. In that work, 104 genera were recognized. Since that time, molecular phylogenetic studies have greatly clarified relationships within the family, and the number of accepted genera is now between 80 and 85.

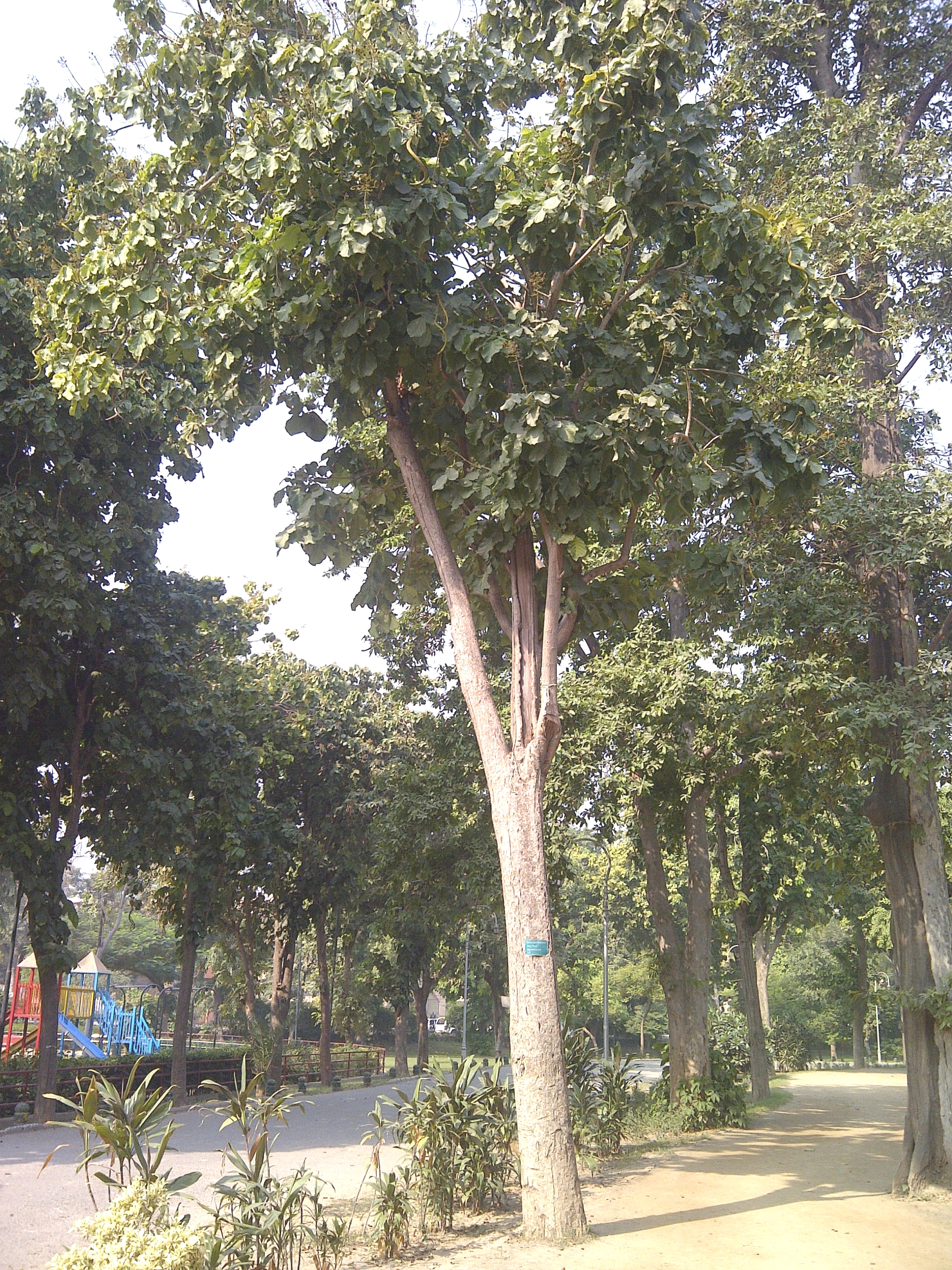
Bignoniaceae in Bagh-e-Jinnah, Lahore

== Description ==
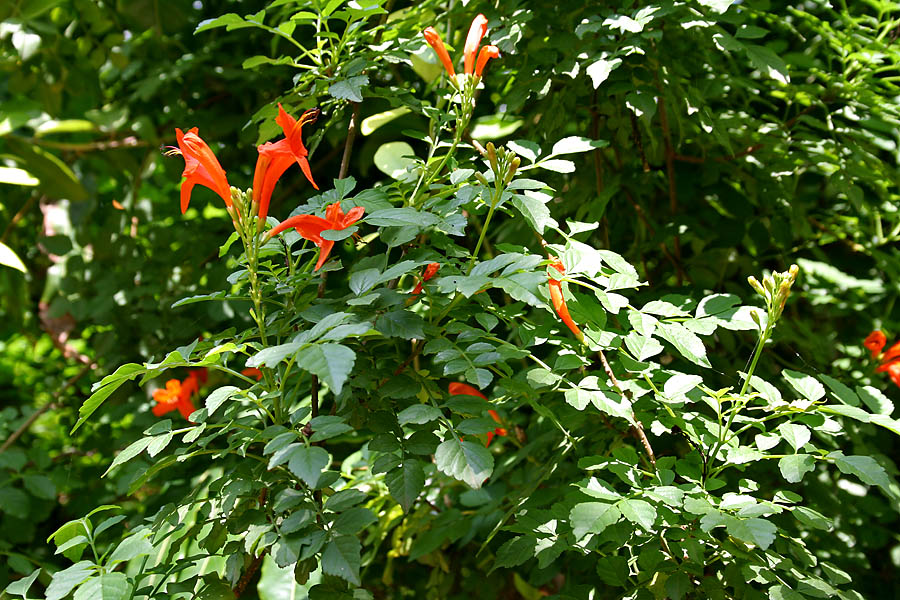
Tecomaria capensis

Members of this family are mostly trees or lianas, sometimes shrubs, and rarely subshrubs or herbs.

Lianas of the tribe Bignonieae have a unique vascular structure, in which phloem arms extend downward into the xylem because certain segments of the cambium cease the production of xylem at an early stage of development. The number of these arms is four or a multiple thereof, up to 32. When four, the phloem arms appear as a cross, hence, the common name "cross vine". The phloem in the arms has wider sieve tubes and less parenchyma than the ordinary phloem.

The leaves are petiolate. Leaf arrangement usually is opposite, or rarely alternate or verticillate (in whorls). Leaves are usually compound, bifoliate, trifoliate, pinnate, or palmate, or rarely simple. Stipules are absent, but persistent; enlarged axillary bud scales (pseudostipules) are often present. Domatia occur in some genera.

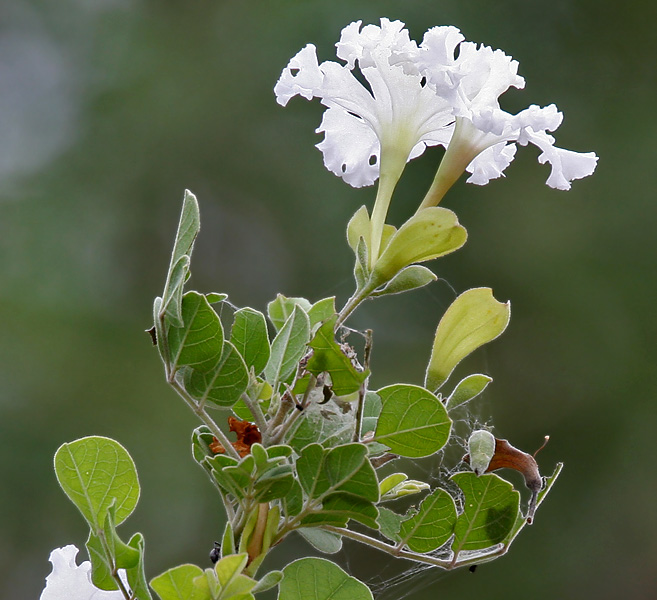
Dolichandrone falcata in Hyderabad, India

Flowers are solitary or in inflorescences in a raceme or a helicoid or dichasial cyme. Inflorescences bear persistent or deciduous bracts or bractlets. The flowers are hypogynous, zygomorphic, bisexual, and usually conspicuous. The calyx and corolla are distinct. The calyx is synsepalous, with five sepals. The corolla is sympetalous, with five petals, often bilabiate. Corolla lobes are imbricate in bud, or rarely valvate, and usually much shorter than the corolla tube. Stamens are inserted on the corolla tube, alternating with corolla lobes. The four stamens are didynamous, members of each pair often connivent, the adaxial stamen is usually staminodial or absent; rarely with five fertile stamens or with two fertile and three staminodial stamens. The stigma is bilobed, and usually sensitive; a style is present. The ovary is superior, usually surrounded by a nectary disk, composed of two carpels, bilocular and with a septum, except unilocular in Tourrettia and quadrilocular in Eccremocarpus. Placentation is axile, except parietal in Tourrettia. Ovules are numerous.

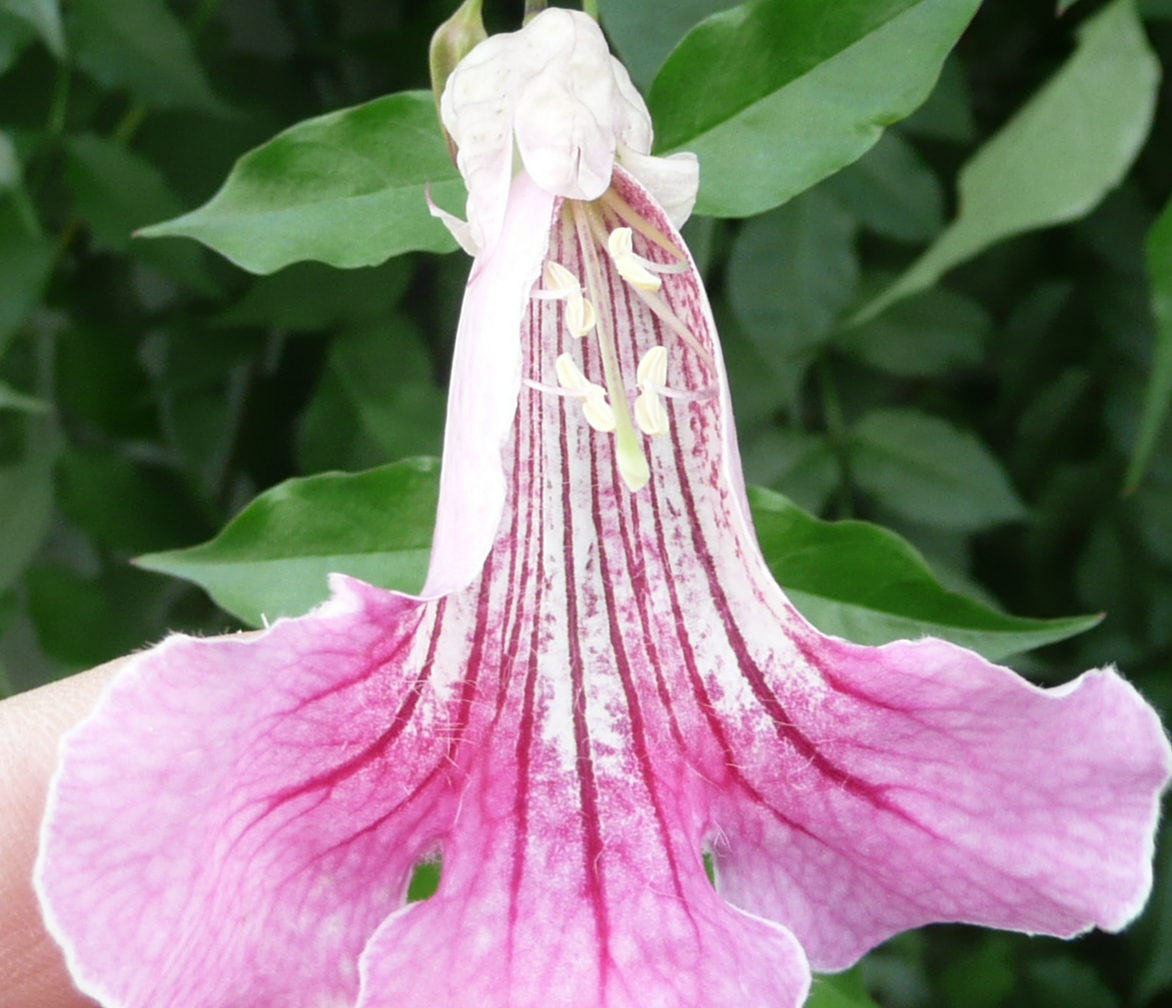
Bignoniaceae flower, upper lip removed. Notice the didynamous 4 stamens and the style-stigma, all in dorsal position.

The fruit is usually a bivalved capsule, often with a replum. Dehiscence is septicidal or loculicidal. The three exceptions are the genera Kigelia, Crescentia and their close relatives, and Colea and its close relatives. In these, the fruit is indehiscent, not a capsule, and the seeds are not winged. The fruit is a berry in these genera. Seeds are usually flat and winged. Aril is absent. Endosperm usually absent, and sometimes sparse.

Lapachol, a yellow, skin-irritating naphthoquinone, is often found in the wood. Other naphthoquinones, as well as anthraquinones, are also present in various parts of the plant. Jacaranone is a quinonoid from Jacaranda. True tannins are not present. Pigments are mostly flavones, anthocyanins, and carotenoids. Iridoids are usually present. Other compounds detected in Bignoniaceae include verbascosides, cornoside, quercetin, ursolic acid, saponins, and catalpic acid.

The chromosome number does not vary much in Bignoniaceae. The haploid (base chromosome number) is 20 for nearly every species sampled, but some species have very small chromosomes, making an accurate count difficult. B chromosomes are common in Bignoniaceae.

Pollination is either entomophilous (via insects), ornithophilous (via birds), or chiropterophilous (via bats).

== Taxonomy ==
The family Bignoniaceae was first validly published in the botanical literature (as Bignonieae) by Antoine Laurent de Jussieu in 1789 in his classic work, Genera Plantarum. The type genus for this family is Bignonia, which was validated by Linnaeus in Species Plantarum in 1753. The name originated with Joseph Pitton de Tournefort, who named it for his benefactor, Jean-Paul Bignon, in 1694, in his influential Eléments de botanique ou méthode pour connaître les plantes.

Important groundwork for future study of the family was laid down from 1789 to 1837, mostly by Jussieu, Kunth, Bojer and G.Don (George Don (1798–1856) not George Don the elder (1764–1814). Bentham and Hooker surveyed the family in their Genera Plantarum in 1876. Karl Moritz Schumann wrote a monograph on Bignoniaceae in 1894 for Engler and Prantl's Die Natürlichen Pflanzenfamilien. After Schumann's monograph, no taxonomic treatment of the entire family was published until 2004.

As the number of known species gradually increased, a great deal of confusion developed over the delimitation of genera. New genera were frequently erected for species that did not clearly belong to any of the previously described genera. This resulted in a proliferation of monotypic genera. Gentry reduced the number of genera in 1973, 1976, and 1979. Nevertheless, the revision of 2004 described 104 genera, 38 of them monotypic.

This problem was especially acute in the tribe Bignonieae. In that tribe, many species of uncertain affinity were assigned to a vaguely defined Arrabidaea, turning that genus into a "wastebasket" of about 100 species.

Since 2004, molecular phylogenetic studies have shown a substantial revision of the genera is necessary. Much work toward this goal can be viewed online, but little of it has yet been published in scientific papers.

A detailed taxonomic history of Bignoniaceae was published in 1980. A summary of this history was published in 1999.

=== Classification ===
In the APG IV system of classification for flowering plants, Bignoniaceae is one of the 24 families in the order Lamiales. (Lamiales has 25 families if Rehmanniaceae are accepted). Within the order, Bignoniaceae is in a group of eight families consisting of Thomandersiaceae, Pedaliaceae, Martyniaceae, Schlegeliaceae, Bignoniaceae, Verbenaceae, Acanthaceae, and Lentibulariaceae. This group is described as a polytomy, meaning no two of its members are known to be more closely related to each other than to any of the others. Statistical support for this group remains weak, indicating insufficient data have been applied, or the group is an artifact of some phylogenetic method.

The composition of Bignoniaceae has been relatively stable and has not varied at all in the 21st century. In the 20th century, the only issues of circumscription were whether Paulowniaceae and Schlegeliaceae should be merged into Bignoniaceae, or accepted as separate families. The Paulowniaceae consist of one to four genera: Paulownia, Shiuyinghua, Wightia, and Brandisia. Whatever their circumscription, Paulowniaceae are now known to be close to Phrymaceae and Orobanchaceae, rather than to Bignoniaceae. The family Schlegeliaceae has been included in Bignoniaceae, as tribe Schlegelieae, as recently as 1980. It is now accepted as a distinct family, but its relationships with several other families remain unresolved.

In molecular phylogenetic analyses, Bignoniaceae has surprisingly weak bootstrap support, given its morphological coherence. The tribe Jacarandeae (Digomphia and Jacaranda) is sister to the rest of the family, which is known as the Core Bignoniaceae. The Core Bignoniaceae is strongly supported in all molecular phylogenetic analyses, but has no known morphological synapomorphy.

No subfamilies have been proposed for Bignoniaceae in recent taxonomy, but in 2004, Fischer et al. divided the family into seven tribes: Tourrettieae, Eccremocarpeae, Tecomeae (sensu lato), Bignonieae, Oroxyleae, Crescentieae, and Coleeae. Since that time, Tourrettieae and Eccremocarpeae have been merged under the name Tourrettieae. Tecomeae sensu lato has been shown to be polyphyletic, consisting of the following groups: Astianthus, Jacarandeae, Argylia, Delostoma, Perianthomega, Catalpeae, Tecomeae sensu stricto, and all of Crescentiina except those genera placed in Crescentieae or Coleeae. All of these groups are monophyletic except Crescentiina pro parte. The whole Crescentiina is monophyletic. Crescentiina is one of a type of name with no definite taxonomic rank. Crescentiina is composed of two strongly supported clades, informally named the Tabebuia alliance and the Paleotropical clade. The tribe Crescentieae is embedded in the Tabebuia alliance and might be expanded to include Spirotecoma. Coleeae sensu Fischer et al. (2004) is polyphyletic because of the inclusion of Kigelia, and it is nested within the Paleotropical clade. Perianthomega has been transferred from Tecomeae sensu stricto to Bignonieae, where it is sister to the remainder of the tribe. Thus, Bignoniaceae can be divided into 10 monophyletic groups.

=== Phylogeny ===
The phylogenetic tree shown below is based on the results of four phylogenetic studies. For all clades, posterior probability is at least 0.95 and bootstrap support is at least 70%, except where indicated otherwise.

- Bignoniaceae
  - Jacarandeae
    - Jacaranda
  - Core Bignoniaceae
    - Tourrettieae
      - Tourrettia
      - Eccremocarpus
    - - Argylia
      - Tecomeae
        - Campsis
        - Tecoma
        - - Incarvillea
          - Podranea
          - - Lamiodendron
            - Deplanchea
          - - Campsidium
            - - Tecomanthe
              - Pandorea
      - 63
        - Delostoma
        - Bignonieae
          - Perianthomega
          - - - Neojobertia
              - Adenocalymma
            - - Stizophyllum
              - Manaosella
              - Pachyptera
              - Callichlamys
              - - Tanaecium
                - Lundia
                - - - Xylophragma
                    - Fridericia
                  - - Tynanthus
                    - Cuspidaria
              - Dolichandra
              - - Martinella
                - Pleonotoma
              - - Bignonia
                - - - Amphilophium (syn. Distictella)
                  - - Mansoa
                    - - Pyrostegia
                      - Anemopaegma
        - Oroxyleae
          - Oroxylum
          - Hieris
          - Millingtonia
          - Nyctocalos
        - Catalpeae
          - Chilopsis
          - Catalpa
        - Crescentiina
          - Tabebuia alliance
            - Sparattosperma
            - - - Ekmanianthe
                - Tabebuia
              - - Cybistax
                - Godmania
                - Zeyheria
              - Roseodendron
              - - Handroanthus
                - - Spirotecoma
                  - Parmentiera
                  - - Crescentia
                    - Amphitecna
          - Paleotropical clade
            - - Rhigozum
              - - Catophractes
                - Spathodea
            - - Tecomella
              - Radermachera
            - - - Kigelia
                - Stereospermum
              - - Newbouldia
                - Heterophragma
                - Fernandoa
              - - Dolichandrone
                - Markhamia
              - - Rhodocolea
                - - Phylloctenium
                  - Phyllarthron
                - - Colea

=== Genera ===
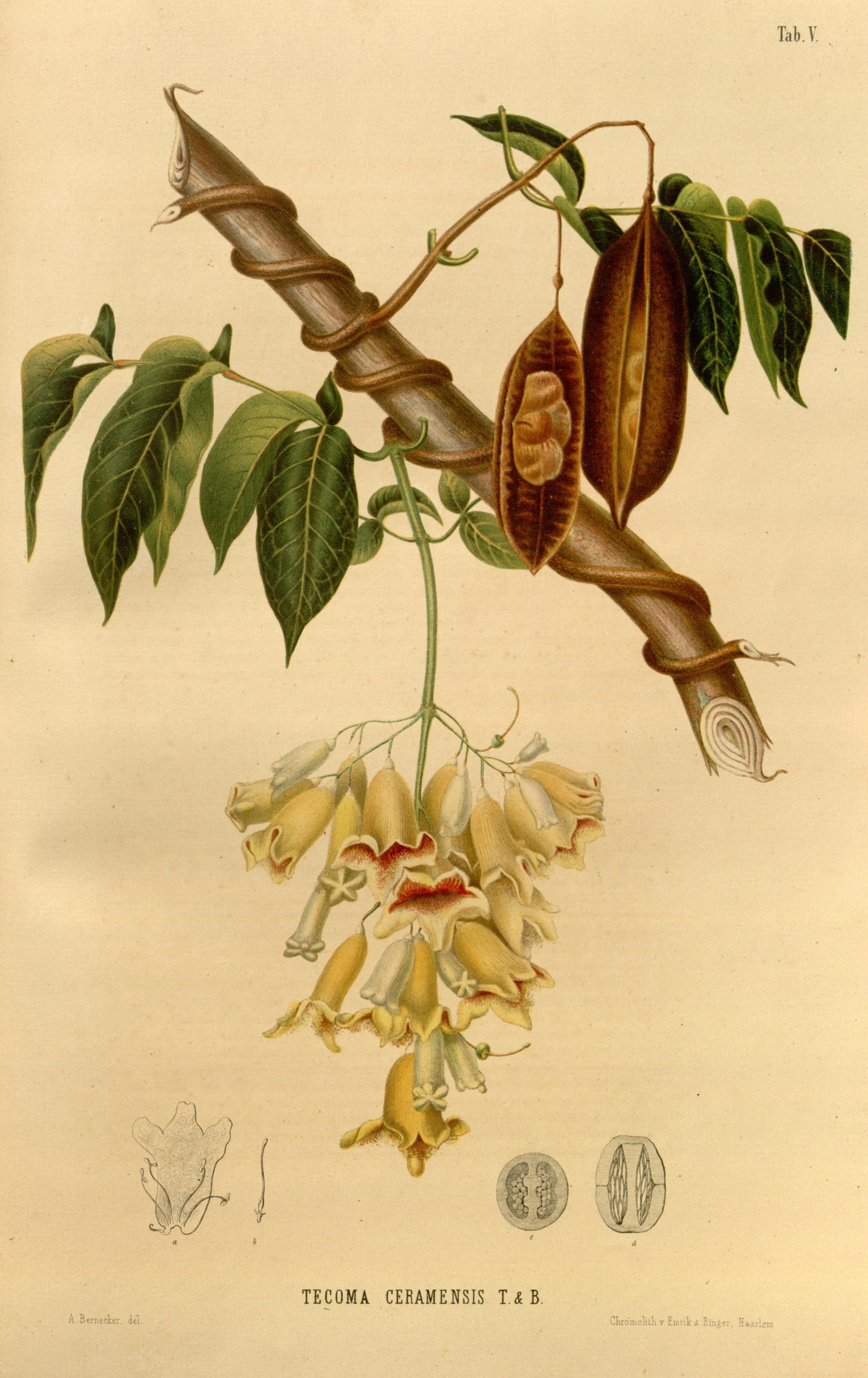
Illustration of a species in the genera Pandorea.

In the last taxonomic revision of Bignoniaceae, 104 genera were described in The Families and Genera of Vascular Plants. Twenty-five of these genera, all in the tribe Bignonieae, were later synonymized under other genera, based on a cladistic analysis of DNA sequences, published in 2006. Roseodendron and Handroanthus were resurrected from Tabebuia in 2007. Mayodendron and Pachyptera have been resurrected.

In 2009, a phylogenetic study divided Bignoniaceae into 10 monophyletic groups, as shown in the genus list below. Six of these groups have been recognized as tribes at one time or another, and are represented by their tribal names. Two of the groups are monogeneric and are designated by their constituent genera, Argylia and Delostoma. The other two groups are given informal names, pending a formal revision of the infrafamilial classification.

Astianthus has never been sampled for DNA and its systematic position within the family remains obscure. Likewise, the placement of Romeroa in the Tabebuia alliance and the placement of Sphingiphila in Bignonieae are in doubt.

Tecomaria is not included in the list below, and its recognition is controversial. It is monotypic (Tecomaria capensis), and had been long accepted, but was returned to Tecoma in 1980. A molecular phylogenetic study resolved it as sister to another South African genus, Podranea, but with only weak bootstrap support. Tecomaria has not yet been resurrected or transferred to another genus.

The tribe Bignonieae has been the subject of considerable revision since 2006. Fischer et al. placed 46 genera in this tribe. Afterward, Perianthomega was transferred to it from Tecomeae sensu lato and Pachyptera was resurrected from Mansoa. Twenty-five of the genera of Fischer have been subsumed into other genera as follows: Gardnerodoxa into Neojobertia; Memora into Adenocalymma; Leucocalantha into Pachyptera; Pseudocatalpa, Paragonia, Periarrabidaea, Spathicalyx, and Ceratophytum into Tanaecium; Arrabidaea and Piriadacus into Fridericia; Clytostoma, Cydista, Macranthisiphon, Mussatia, Phryganocydia, Potamoganos, Roentgenia and Saritaea into Bignonia; also Distictis, Glaziovia, Haplolophium, and Pithecoctenium into Amphilophium. Thus, 23 genera are now recognized in Bignonieae.

Incertae sedis

- Astianthus

Tribe Jacarandeae

- Jacaranda (synonym Digomphia)

Tribe Tourrettieae

- Eccremocarpus
- Tourrettia

Genus Argylia
Tribe Tecomeae

- Campsidium
- Campsis
- Deplanchea
- Dinklageodoxa
- Incarvillea
- Lamiodendron
- Neosepicaea
- Pandorea
- Podranea
- Tecoma
- Tecomanthe

Genus Delostoma

=== Tribe Bignonieae ===
- Adenocalymma
- Amphilophium (synonym Distictella)
- Anemopaegma
- Bignonia
- Callichlamys
- Cuspidaria
- Dolichandra
- Fridericia
- Lundia
- Manaosella
- Mansoa
- Martinella
- Neojobertia
- Pachyptera
- Perianthomega
- Pleonotoma
- Pyrostegia
- Stizophyllum
- Tanaecium (synonym Sphingiphila)
- Tynanthus
- Xylophragma

Tribe Oroxyleae

- Hieris
- Millingtonia
- Nyctocalos
- Oroxylum

Tribe Catalpeae

- Chilopsis
- Catalpa

=== Crescentiina group ===
==== Tabebuia alliance ====
- Amphitecna
- Crescentia
- Cybistax
- Ekmanianthe
- Godmania
- Handroanthus
- Paratecoma
- Parmentiera
- Romeroa
- Roseodendron
- Sparattosperma
- Spirotecoma
- Tabebuia
- Zeyheria

==== Paleotropical clade ====
- Catophractes
- Colea (synonym Ophiocolea)
- Dolichandrone
- Fernandoa (synonym Haplophragma)
- Heterophragma
- Kigelia
- Markhamia
- Mayodendron
- Newbouldia
- Pajanelia
- Pauldopia
- Perichlaena
- Phyllarthron
- Phylloctenium
- Radermachera
- Rhigozum
- Rhodocolea
- Tecomella
- Santisukia
- Spathodea
- Stereospermum

=== Obsolete genera ===
- Arrabidaea
- Ceratophytum
- Clytostoma
- Cydista
- Distictis
- Gardnerodoxa
- Glaziovia
- Haplolophium
- Leucocalantha
- Macfadyena
- Macranthisiphon
- Melloa
- Memora
- Mussatia
- Parabignonia
- Paragonia
- Periarrabidaea
- Phryganocydia
- Piriadacus
- Pithecoctenium
- Potamoganos
- Pseudocatalpa
- Roentgenia
- Saritaea
- Spathicalyx

== Uses ==
Many species of Bignoniaceae have some use, either commercially or ethnobotanically, but the most important, by far, are those planted as ornamentals, especially the flowering trees. Jacaranda, Campsis, Pyrostegia, Tabebuia, Catalpa, Roseodendron, Handroanthus and Crescentia all have species of horticultural significance, at least in warm climates. Several others, including Tecoma, Podranea, Pandorea, Bignonia and Mansoa are frequently grown as ornamentals, at least in certain areas of the tropics. A great many species are known in cultivation, if only rarely.

Jacaranda mimosifolia is common as an avenue tree. The winged petiole and trifoliate leaf of Crescentia alata resembles a crucifixion cross, so is sometimes planted in the Philippines as a religious symbol.

Handroanthus and the unrelated Guaiacum (Zygophyllaceae) have the hardest, heaviest, and most durable wood of the American tropics. Important timber trees in Handroanthus include H. heptaphyllus, H. serratifolius, H. guayacan, H. chrysanthus, and H. billbergii. Tabebuia rosea (including Tabebuia pentaphylla) is harvested for lumber throughout the New World tropics. Tabebuia heterophylla, and Tabebuia angustata are important sources of lumber for some of the Caribbean islands. Several species of Catalpa are also important timber trees.

Paratecoma was once the most important timber tree of the Rio de Janeiro area, but relentless exploitation has brought it to the verge of extinction. Several of the rare species of Bignoniaceae produce excellent wood, but are often not recognized by lumberjacks.

Several uses of plants in Bignoniaceae are known locally. Parmentiera aculeata is grown for its edible fruit in Central America and southern Mexico. The powdered seeds and sometimes the fruit pulp of Crescentia cujete and Crescentia alata are used in Nicaragua to make a refresco called semilla de jicaro. Onion-scented species of Mansoa and clove-scented species of Tynanthus are used as condiments.

In northern Colombia, shavings of the stems of Dolichandra quadrivalvis are added to bait which is left overnight near the burrows of crabs. The crabs are paralyzed for a few hours after eating the bait and are picked up by crabbers in the morning. The crabs recover before they reach market, and no harm from eating them has been reported.

Tanaecium nocturnum is the source of a hallucinogenic drug. Its crushed leaves and stems are used to enervate bees while gathering honey.

Fridericia chica is the source of a red pigment used in the Amazon Basin for body paint and for dye in basketry. Cybistax antisyphilitica is the source of a blue dye commonly used in Peru. The bark of Sparattosperma leucantha is used in Bolivia to produce a brown dye for staining cotton thread.

Medical claims are innumerable and usually spurious. Gentry describes an especially ludicrous example.

Misidentification of plants, even by botanists, continues to be a big problem for ethnobotany, and it is especially severe for Bignoniaceae. Voucher specimens are often sterile and fragmentary, making them nearly impossible to identify. False medical claims are often based on mistaken identification.

The bark of several species of Handroanthus is sold in South American markets. Similar-looking bark is often fraudulently passed off as Handroanthus. It is used in various ways to relieve certain symptoms of certain cancers. No evidence shows it prevents the disease or slows its progression, as is often claimed.

Adenocalymma flavida has been used to relieve the aching of joints and muscles. A root extract from Martinella is useful in the treatment of conjunctivitis and possibly other conditions of the eye.

== Sources ==
- Alwyn H. Gentry. 1992. "Bignoniaceae: Part II (Tecomeae)". Flora Neotropica Monograph 25(2):1-150. (See External links below).
