= David Don =

Scottish botanist (1799–1841)

- Born: 21 December 1799; Forfar, Angus, Scotland
- Died: 15 December 1841 (aged 41)
- Known for: Description of major conifers
- Spouse: Mary Evans
- Parent(s): Caroline Clementina Stuart and George Don
- Relatives: George Don, brother
- Scientific career
- Fields: Botany
- Workplaces: King's College London; Linnean Society, London
- Author abbrev. (botany): D.Don

David Don (21 December 1799 – 15 December 1841) was a Scottish botanist.

== Biography ==
David Don was born on 21 December 1799 at Doo Hillock, Forfar, Angus, Scotland to Caroline Clementina Stuart, and her husband George Don of Forfar. His older brother was George Don, also a botanist. His father was a curator at the Royal Botanic Garden, Leith Walk, Edinburgh. Don was Professor of Botany at King's College London from 1836 to 1841, and librarian at the Linnean Society of London from 1822 to 1841.

He described several of the major conifers discovered in the period, including first descriptions of coast redwood (Taxodium sempervirens D. Don; now Sequoia sempervirens (D. Don) Endl.), Bristlecone Fir (Pinus bracteata D. Don, now Abies bracteata (D. Don) A. Poit.), Grand Fir (Pinus grandis Douglas ex D. Don; now Abies grandis (Douglas ex D. Don) Lindl.) and Coulter Pine (Pinus coulteri D. Don), and was the first to treat Sugi (Cupressus japonica Thunb.; now Cryptomeria japonica (Thunb.) D. Don) in a new genus.

He also named the orchid genus Pleione in 1825.

Don was librarian to the botanist Aylmer Bourke Lambert and compiled for him, Prodromus florae nepalensis ... London, J. Gale, 1825, based on collections made by the botanists Francis Hamilton and Nathaniel Wallich of the Calcutta Botanic Garden.

On 15 April 1837 in Soho he married Mary Evans (1788/9–1864). He died on 8 December 1841 from cancer, and is buried at Kensal Green.

As a teacher he was much beloved by his pupils; time was never made an object when he had the advantage of his class in view. The same urbanity of manner and liberality in imparting all he knew distinguished him in his position at the Linnaean Society.

In 1938, the London County Council marked Don at 32 Soho Square with a rectangular stone plaque, commemorating him as well as botanists Joseph Banks and Robert Brown and meetings of the Linnean Society.

== List of selected publications ==
- Don, David (1836). Lindley, John (ed.). "Clavija ornata". Edwards's Botanical Register. 21: Pl. 1864. Theophrastaceae

== See also ==
- Category:Taxa named by David Don

== Bibliography ==
- Stephen, Leslie, ed. (1888). "Don, David" . Dictionary of National Biography. Vol. 15. London: Smith, Elder & Co.
