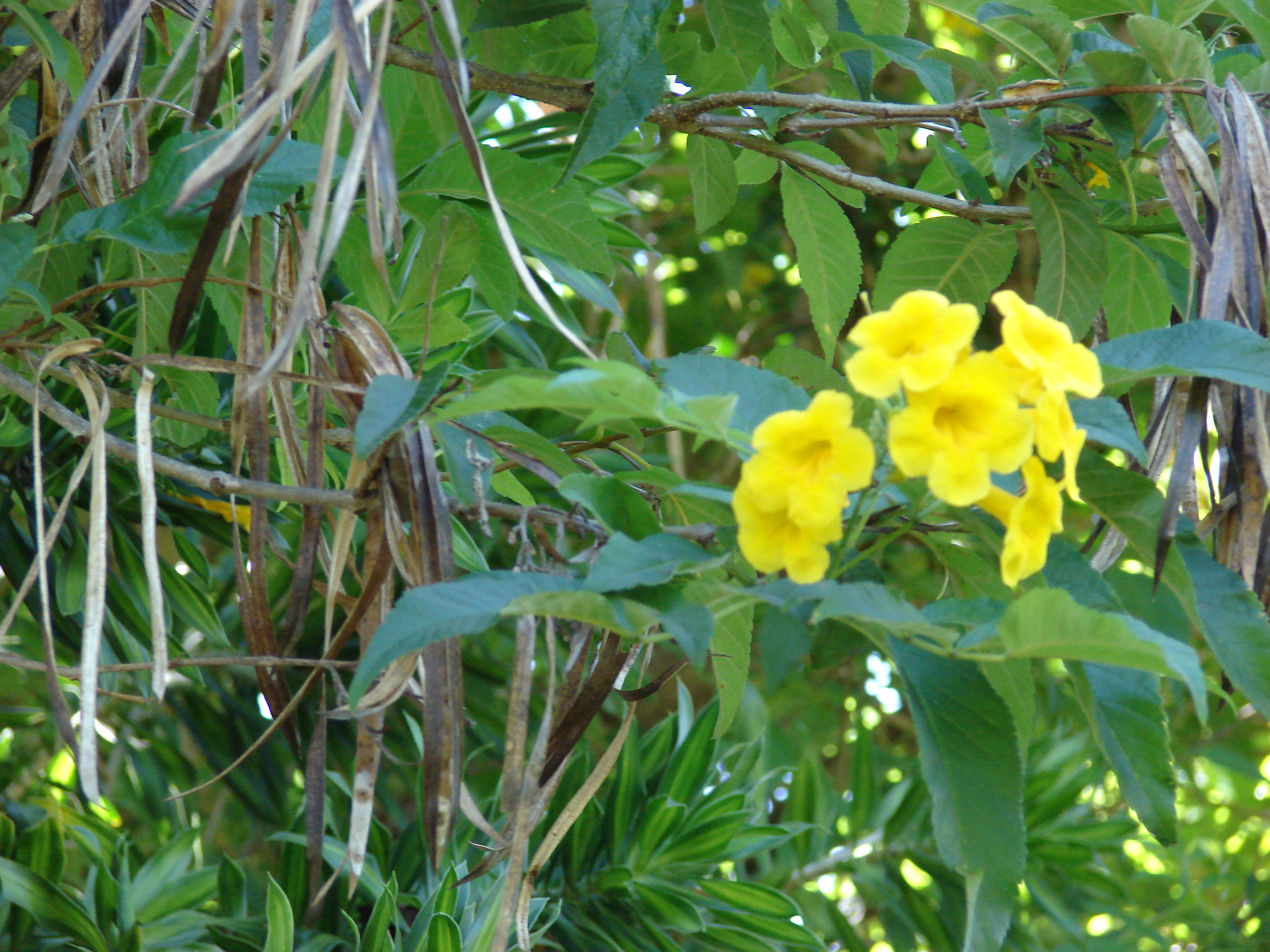
- Tecoma stans

Scientific classification
- Kingdom: Plantae
- Clade: Tracheophytes
- Clade: Angiosperms
- Clade: Eudicots
- Clade: Asterids
- Order: Lamiales
- Family: Bignoniaceae
- Tribe: Tecomeae
- Genus: Tecoma; Juss. (1789)

Species
- 7; see text

Synonyms
- Ducoudraea Bureau (1864); Gelseminum Kuntze (1891), nom. illeg.; Kokoschkinia Turcz. (1849); Stenolobium D.Don (1823)

= Tecoma =

Genus of shrubs and trees

Tecoma is a genus of seven species of shrubs or small trees in the trumpet vine family, Bignoniaceae. The generic name is derived from the Nahuatl word tecomaxochitl, which was applied by the indigenous peoples of Mexico to plants with tubular flowers. Trumpetbush is a common name for plants in this genus.

They are native to the Americas, ranging from the extreme southern United States through Central America and the Antilles south through Andean South America to northern Argentina.

== Species ==
Image	Name	Subspecies	Distribution
	Tecoma beckii J.R.I.Wood		Bolivia
	Tecoma castanifolia (D.Don) Melch. – Chestnutleaf trumpetbush		Ecuador, Peru
	Tecoma fulva (Cavanilles) D.Don	Tecoma fulva subsp. fulva; Tecoma fulva subsp. altoandina J. R. I. Wood (Bolivia); Tecoma fulva subsp. arequipensis (Sprague) J.R.I.Wood; Tecoma fulva subsp. garrocha (Hieron.) J.R.I.Wood; Tecoma fulva subsp. guarume (DC.) J.R.I.Wood; Tecoma fulva subsp. tanaeciiflora (Kraenzl.) J.R.I.Wood	Bolivia
	Tecoma rosifolia Humboldt, Bonpland & Kunth		Peru, Bolivia
	Tecoma stans (L.) Juss. ex Kunth – Yellow trumpetbush	Tecoma stans var. stans; Tecoma stans var. sambucifolia; Tecoma stans var. velutina DC.	Americas
	Tecoma tenuiflora (DC.) Fabris		Bolivia and Argentina
	Tecoma weberbaueriana (Kränzlin) Melchior		Peru, Ecuador

=== Hybrids and cultivars ===
- Tecoma × smithii W. Watson

=== Formerly placed here ===
- Campsidium valdivianum (Phil.) Skottsb. (as T. valdiviana Phil.)
- Campsis × tagliabuana (Vis.) Rehder (as T. tagliabuana Vis.)
- Handroanthus albus (as T. alba Cham.)
- Handroanthus impetiginosus (as T. impetiginosa Mart. ex DC.)
- Handroanthus chrysotrichus (syn. Tabebuia chrysotricha, as T. chrysotrichus Mart. ex DC.)
- Pandorea jasminoides (Lindl.) K.Schum. (as T. jasminoides Lindl.)
- Pandorea pandorana (Andrews) Steenis (as T. australis R.Br. or T. pandorana (Andrews) Skeels)
- Paratecoma peroba (Record & Mell) Kuhlm. (as T. peroba Record & Mell)
- Podranea brycei (N.E.Br.) Sprague (as T. brycei N.E.Br.)
- Podranea ricasoliana (Tanfani) Sprague (as T. mackenii W.Watson or T. ricasoliana Tanfani)
- Tabebuia aurea (Silva Manso) Benth. & Hook.f. ex S.Moore (as T. argentea Bureau & K.Schum. or T. caraiba Mart.)
- Tabebuia bahamensis (Northr.) Britton (as T. bahamensis Northr.)
- Tabebuia berteroi (DC.) Britton (as T. berteroi DC.)
- Tabebuia chrysantha subsp. meridionalis A.H.Gentry (as T. spectabilis Planch. & Linden)
- Tabebuia guayacan (Seem.) Hemsl. (as T. guayacan Seem.)
- Tabebuia heptaphylla (Vell.) Toledo (as T. ipe Mart. ex K.Schum.)
- Tabebuia heterophylla (DC.) Britton (as T. leucoxylon (L.) Mart. ex DC. or T. pentaphylla Juss. ex DC.)
- Tabebuia ochracea subsp. heterotricha (DC.) A.H.Gentry) (as T. heterotricha DC.)
- Tabebuia ochracea subsp. ochracea (as T. ochracea Cham.)
- Tabebuia rosea (Bertol.) DC. (as T. rosea Bertol.)
- Tabebuia serratifolia (Vahl) G.Nicholson (as T. serratifolia (Vahl) G.Don)
- Tecomanthe dendrophila (Blume) K.Schum. (as T. dendrophila Blume)
- Tecomaria capensis (Thunb.) Spach (as T. capensis (Thunb.) Lindl.)
- Tecomaria nyassae (Oliv.) Baill. (as T. nyassae Oliv.)
- Tecomella undulata (Sm.) Seem. (as T. undulata (Sm.) G.Don)
