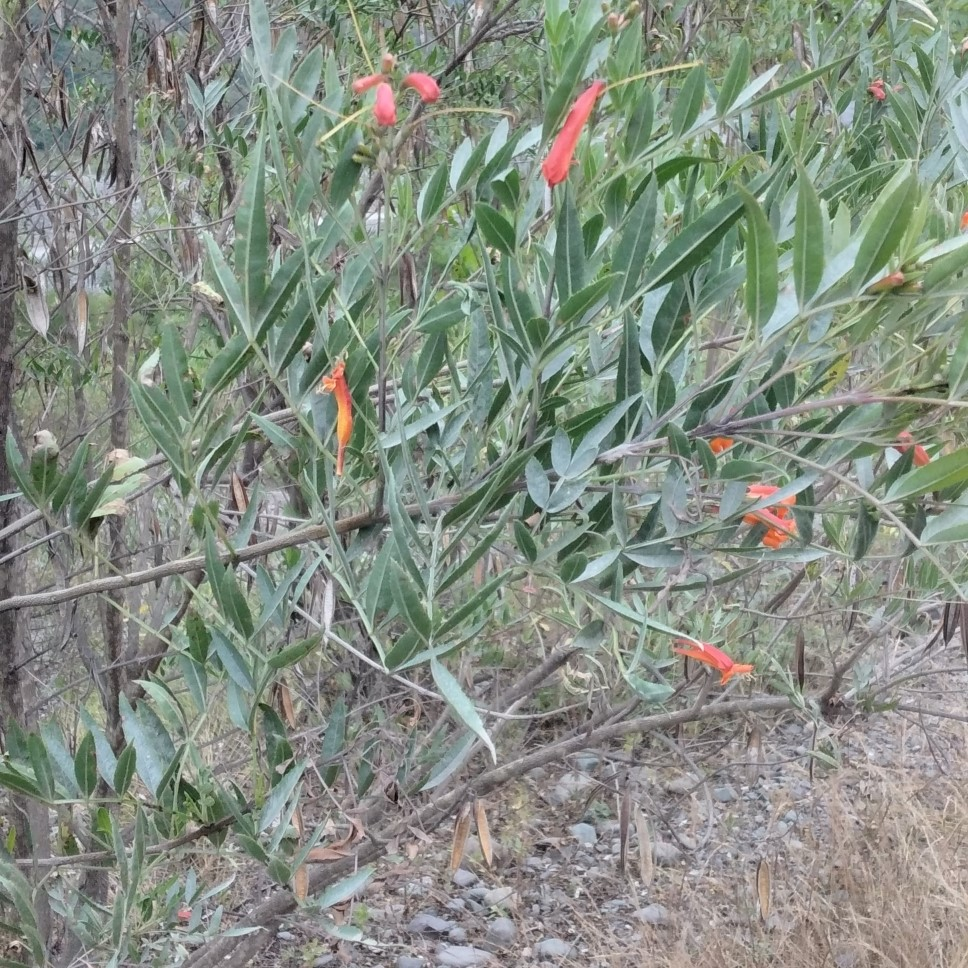

Scientific classification
- Kingdom: Plantae
- Clade: Tracheophytes
- Clade: Angiosperms
- Clade: Eudicots
- Clade: Asterids
- Order: Lamiales
- Family: Bignoniaceae
- Genus: Tecoma
- Species: T. tenuiflora

Binomial name
- Tecoma tenuiflora (DC.) Fabris

Synonyms
- Bignonia tenuiflora DC.; Gelseminum amoenum Kuntze; Stenolobium amoenum (Kuntze) K.Schum.

= Tecoma tenuiflora =

Species of flowering plant

Tecoma tenuiflora is a species of flowering plant native to Bolivia and Argentina. It is thought to be closely related to T. rosifolia, and hybridizes with T. stans and T. beckii.
