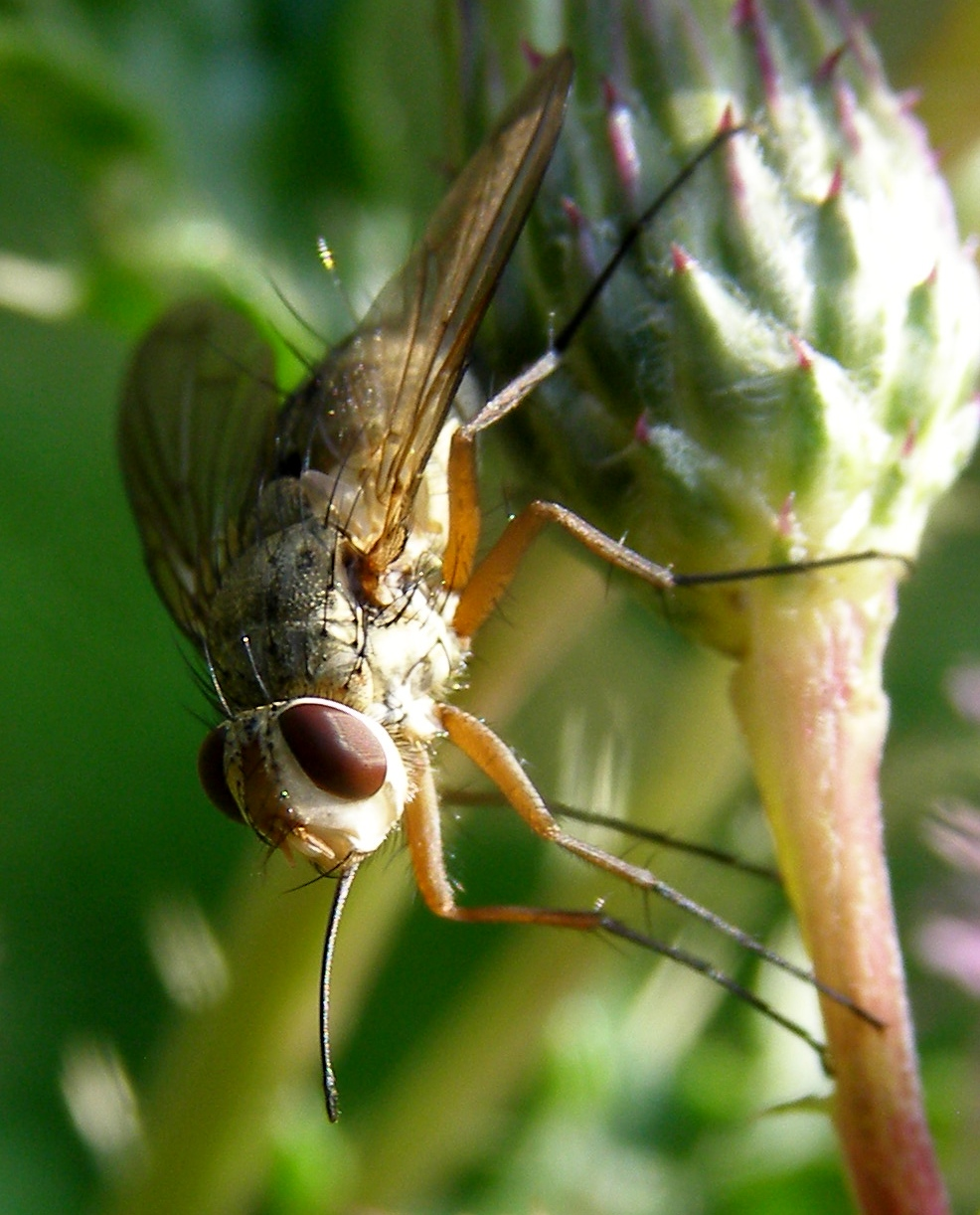
- Prosena siberita

Scientific classification
- Kingdom: Animalia
- Phylum: Arthropoda
- Class: Insecta
- Order: Diptera
- Family: Tachinidae
- Subfamily: Dexiinae
- Tribe: Dexiini
- Genus: Prosena
- Species: P. siberita

Binomial name
- Prosena siberita (Fabricius,1775)

Synonyms
- Calirrhoe malayana Townsend, 1926; Prosena brevirostris Emden, 1947; Prosena epicurea Rondani, 1861; Prosena longirostris Egger, 1860; Prosena luculliana Rondani, 1861; Prosena sybarita Rondani, 1861; Stomoxys flavipennis Wiedemann, 1819; Stomoxys grisea Fabricius, 1794; Stomoxys longipes Gmelin, 1790; Stomoxys siberita Fabricius, 1775

= Prosena siberita =

Species of fly

Prosena siberita is a species of fly in the family Tachinidae.

== Distribution ==
This species is present in most of Europe, Central Asia, Japan, Mongolia, China, Russia, Transcaucasia, India, Indonesia, Malaysia, Myanmar, Nepal, Philippines, Ryukyu Islands, Sri Lanka, Taiwan, Australia and New Caledonia. It has been introduced and established in United States. The earliest introduction occurred in 1925, when numerous specimens were released in New Jersey for the purpose of establishing a local population to combat the spread of the Japanese beetle.

== Description ==
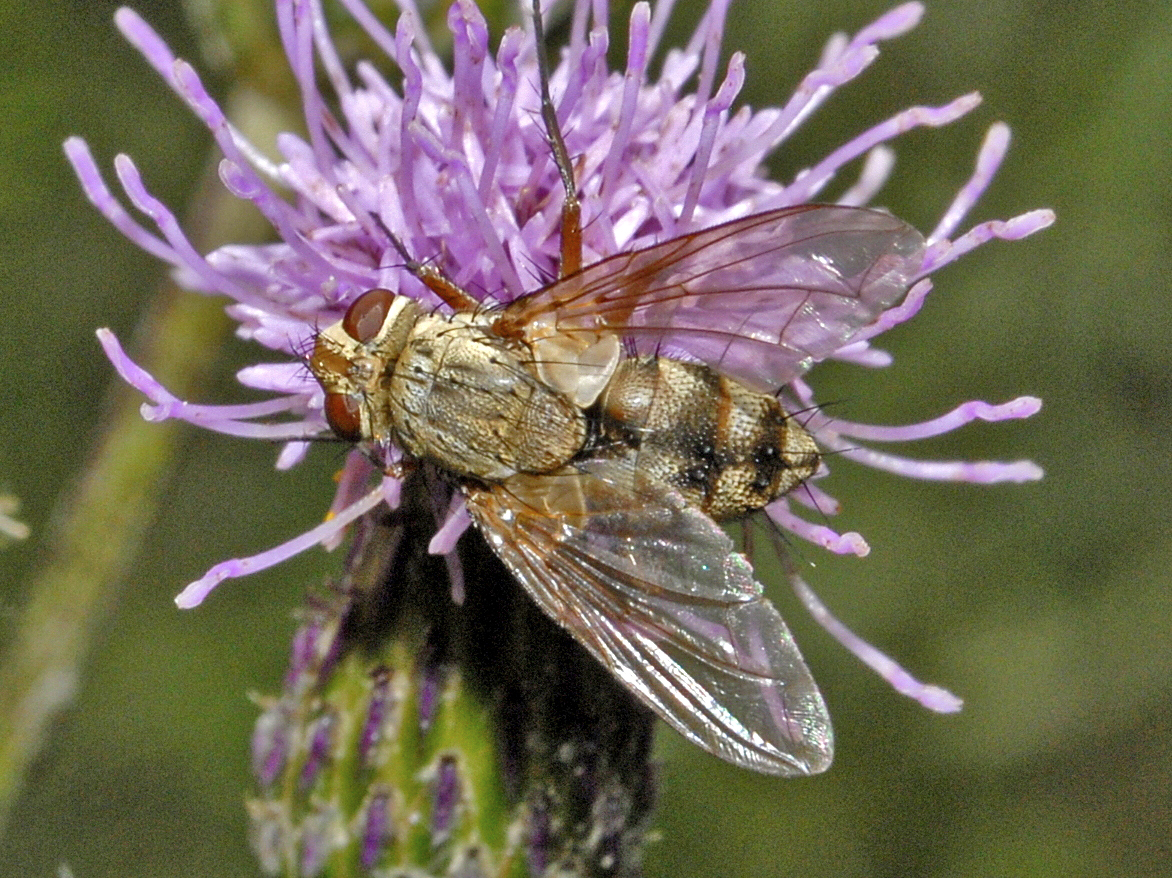
Dorsal view

Prosena siberita can reach a body length of 7.5–10.5 millimetres (0.30–0.41 in). These flies have a grey dusted, fuscous or testaceour body. In males the abdomen is largely testaceous, while in females it is fuscous, densely grey dusted. Thorax shows some yellowish hairs. They have a very long and slender proboscis that they keep hinged under the body. The length of the proboscis is longer than the height of the head. Palpi are highly reduced. Eyes are reddish-brown and bare. Femora are reddish. Wings are hyaline, yellowish-brown at the base.

== Biology ==
P. siberita. Video clip

Prosena siberita is a univoltine species. Adults are harmless nectar feeders on flowers of various plants (Clematis gouriana, Gnaphalium sp., Tecoma castanifolia, Seseli libanotis, Patrinia scabiosifolia, etc.). Their larvae parasitize the larvae of various Sericini, Melolonthini and Anomalini scarab beetles (Popillia japonica, Adoretus, Anomala, Leucopholis species).

== Bibliography ==
- James E. O'Hara, Hiroshi Shima, & Chuntian Zhang. "Annotated Catalogue of the Tachinidae (Insecta: Diptera) of China." Zootaxa 2190 (2009): 1–236.
- Sabrosky and Arnaud, in Stone et al., 1965, Catalog of the Diptera of America north of Mexico, p. 987.
