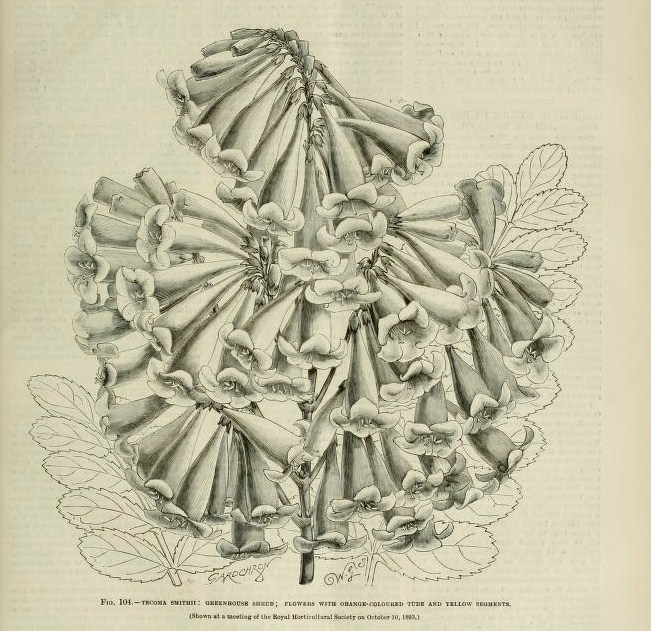

Scientific classification
- Kingdom: Plantae
- Clade: Tracheophytes
- Clade: Angiosperms
- Clade: Eudicots
- Clade: Asterids
- Order: Lamiales
- Family: Bignoniaceae
- Genus: Tecoma
- Species: T. × smithii

Binomial name
- Tecoma × smithii W.Watson

= Tecoma × smithii =

Species of flowering plant

Tecoma × smithii, "Orange Bells", is a hybrid flowering plant in the genus Tecoma. It was first described by W. Watson in London, 1893. It is a shrub growing to 2.4–3.6 m (8–12 ft) in height.
