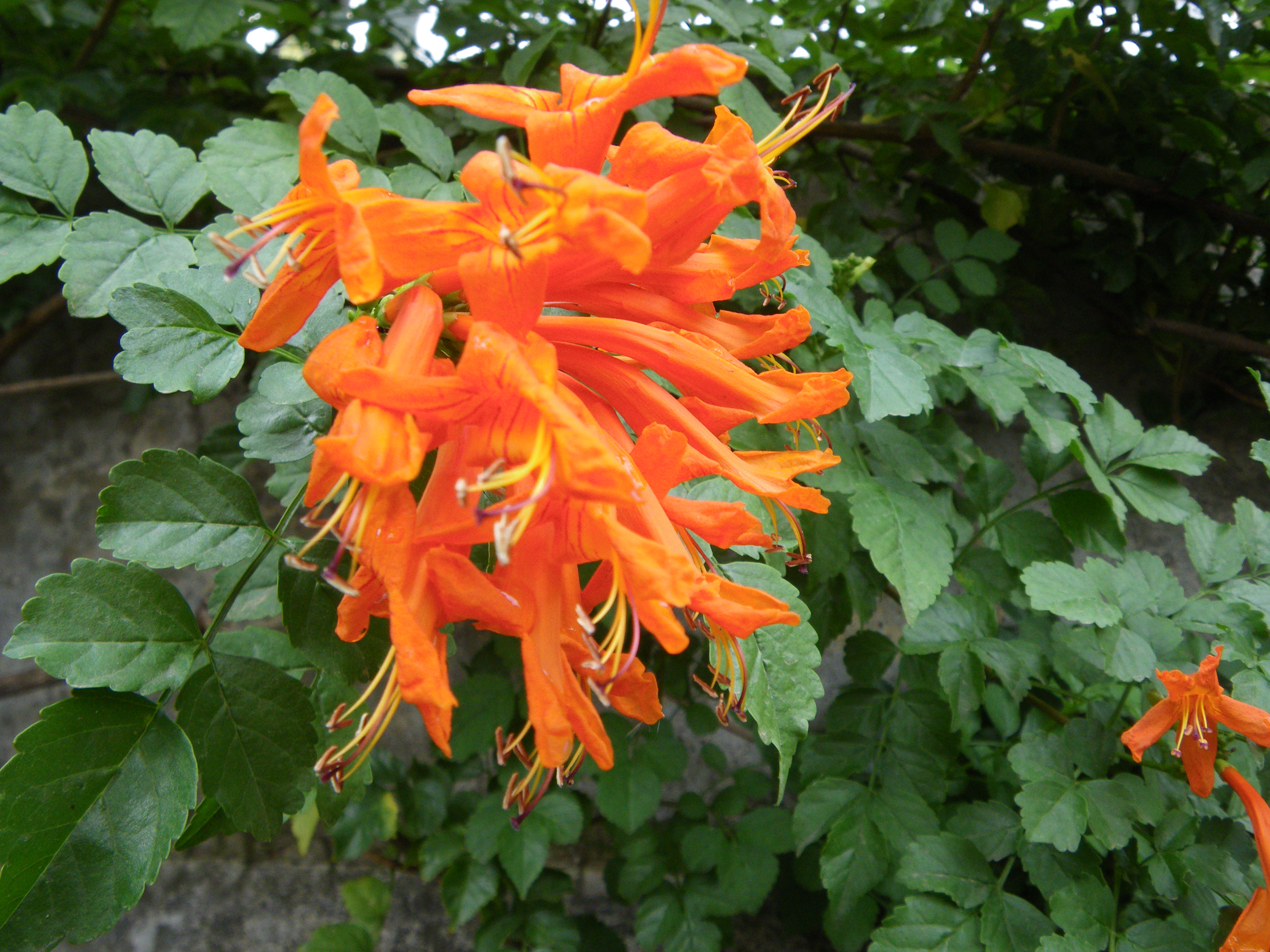
- Tecomaria capensis

Scientific classification
- Kingdom: Plantae
- Clade: Tracheophytes
- Clade: Angiosperms
- Clade: Eudicots
- Clade: Asterids
- Order: Lamiales
- Family: Bignoniaceae
- Genus: Tecomaria; Spach (1840)

Species
- Tecomaria capensis (Thunb.) Spach; Tecomaria nyassae (Oliv.) Baill.

= Tecomaria =

Genus of plants

Tecomaria is a genus of flowering plants in the family Bignoniaceae. It includes two species of shrubs or trees native to sub-Saharan Africa, ranging from the Democratic Republic of the Congo and Tanzania to South Africa.

== Taxonomy ==
In the early 1980s, the genus's name was changed to Tecoma because botanists considered that the differences in the flowers (between Tecomaria and Tecoma) were not striking enough to keep them apart and they should be treated as one – Therefore Tecomaria capensis became Tecoma capensis. Though recent molecular studies indicated that Tecomaria is actually most closely related to Podranea rather than Tecoma, which means that it should not be grouped together with Tecoma, hence restoring the genus Tecomaria. This is a situation where the DNA evidence overturns conclusions made on genetic relationships that are founded only through morphology (how the plants look).

== Species ==
- Tecomaria capensis (Thunb.) Spach – Angola, DR Congo, Tanzania, Malawi, Mozambique, Eswatini, and South Africa
- Tecomaria nyassae (Oliv.) Baill. – Angola, DR Congo, Tanzania, Mozambique, Malawi, and Zambia
