= Tecoma rosifolia =

Scientific classification
- Kingdom: Plantae
- Clade: Tracheophytes
- Clade: Angiosperms
- Clade: Eudicots
- Clade: Asterids
- Order: Lamiales
- Family: Bignoniaceae
- Genus: Tecoma
- Species: T. rosifolia

Binomial name
- Tecoma rosifolia Kunth

Synonyms
- Gelseminum azaleiflorum (Kunth) Kuntze; Gelseminum rosifolium (Kunth) Kuntze; Stenolobium huancabambae Kraenzl.; Tecoma azaleiflora Kunth; Tecomaria roseifolia (Kunth) Seem.

Species of flowering plant

Tecoma rosifolia is a species of flowering plant native to Peru. It is thought to be closely related to T. tenuiflora, and hybridizes with T. stans.
