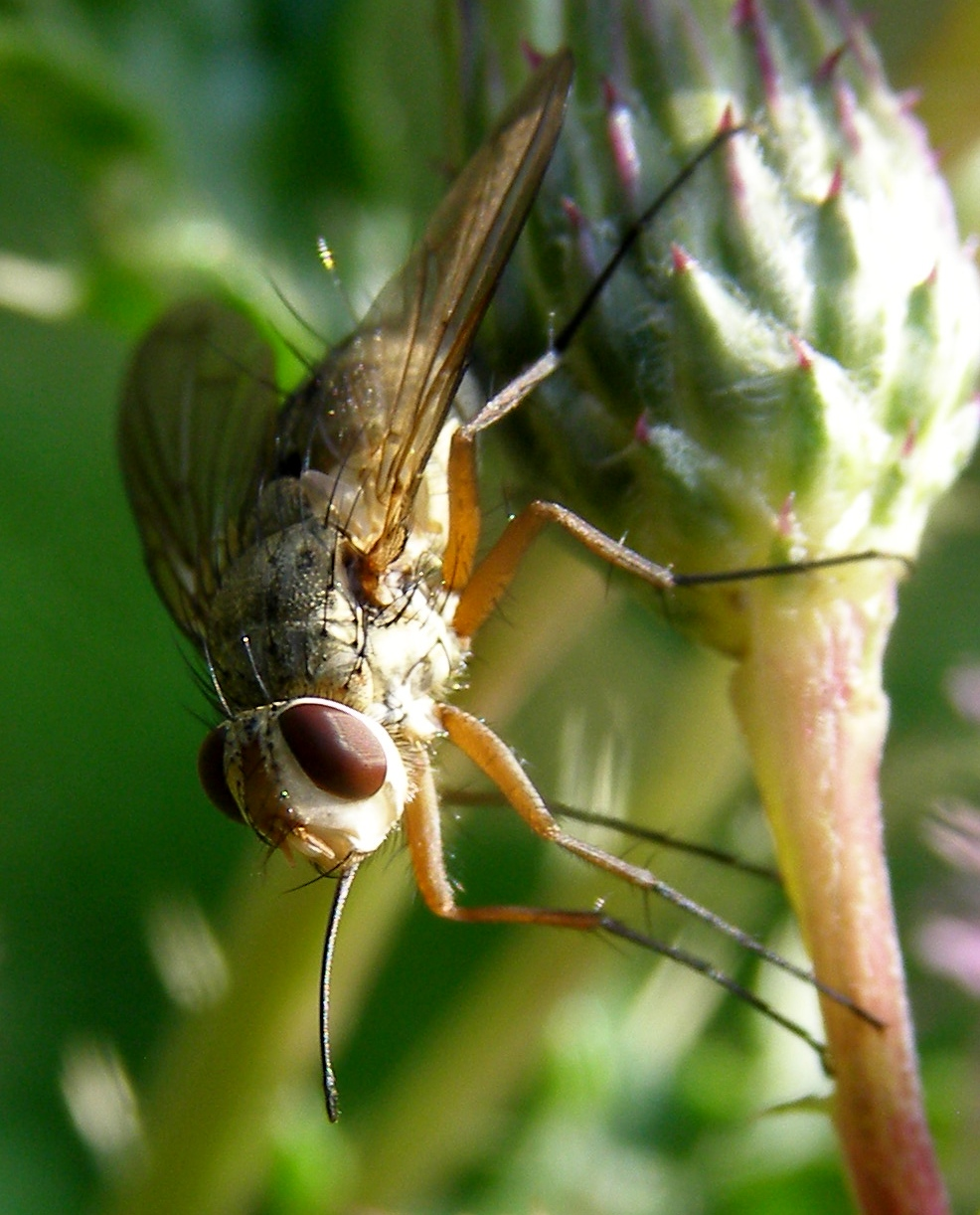
- Prosena siberita

Scientific classification
- Kingdom: Animalia
- Phylum: Arthropoda
- Class: Insecta
- Order: Diptera
- Family: Tachinidae
- Subfamily: Dexiinae
- Tribe: Dexiini
- Genus: Prosena; Lepeletier & Serville, 1828

Type species
- Stomoxys siberita Fabricius, 1775

Synonyms
- Calirrhoe Meigen & Hendel, 1908

= Prosena =

Genus of flies

Prosena is a genus of flies in the family Tachinidae.

== Species ==
- Prosena arcuata Malloch, 1932
- Prosena argentata Walker, 1858
- Prosena bella Curran, 1927
- Prosena bisetosa Malloch, 1932
- Prosena conica Guerin, 1831
- Prosena dimidiata Curran, 1938
- Prosena dispar Macquart, 1851
- Prosena doddi Curran, 1927
- Prosena dorsalis Macquart, 1847
- Prosena facialis Curran, 1929
- Prosena fulvipes (Townsend, 1927)
- Prosena jactans (Walker, 1858)
- Prosena lurida Walker, 1861
- Prosena macropus Thomson, 1869
- Prosena marginalis Curran, 1938
- Prosena nigripes Curran, 1927
- Prosena pectoralis (Walker, 1858)
- Prosena rufiventris Macquart, 1847
- Prosena scutellaris Curran, 1929
- Prosena secedens Walker, 1864
- Prosena siberita (Fabricius, 1775)
- Prosena surda Curran, 1938
- Prosena tenuipes (Walker, 1853)
- Prosena tenuis Malloch, 1930
- Prosena varia Curran, 1929
- Prosena variegata Curran, 1929
- Prosena vittata Guerin-Meneville, 1838
- Prosena zonalis Curran, 1929
