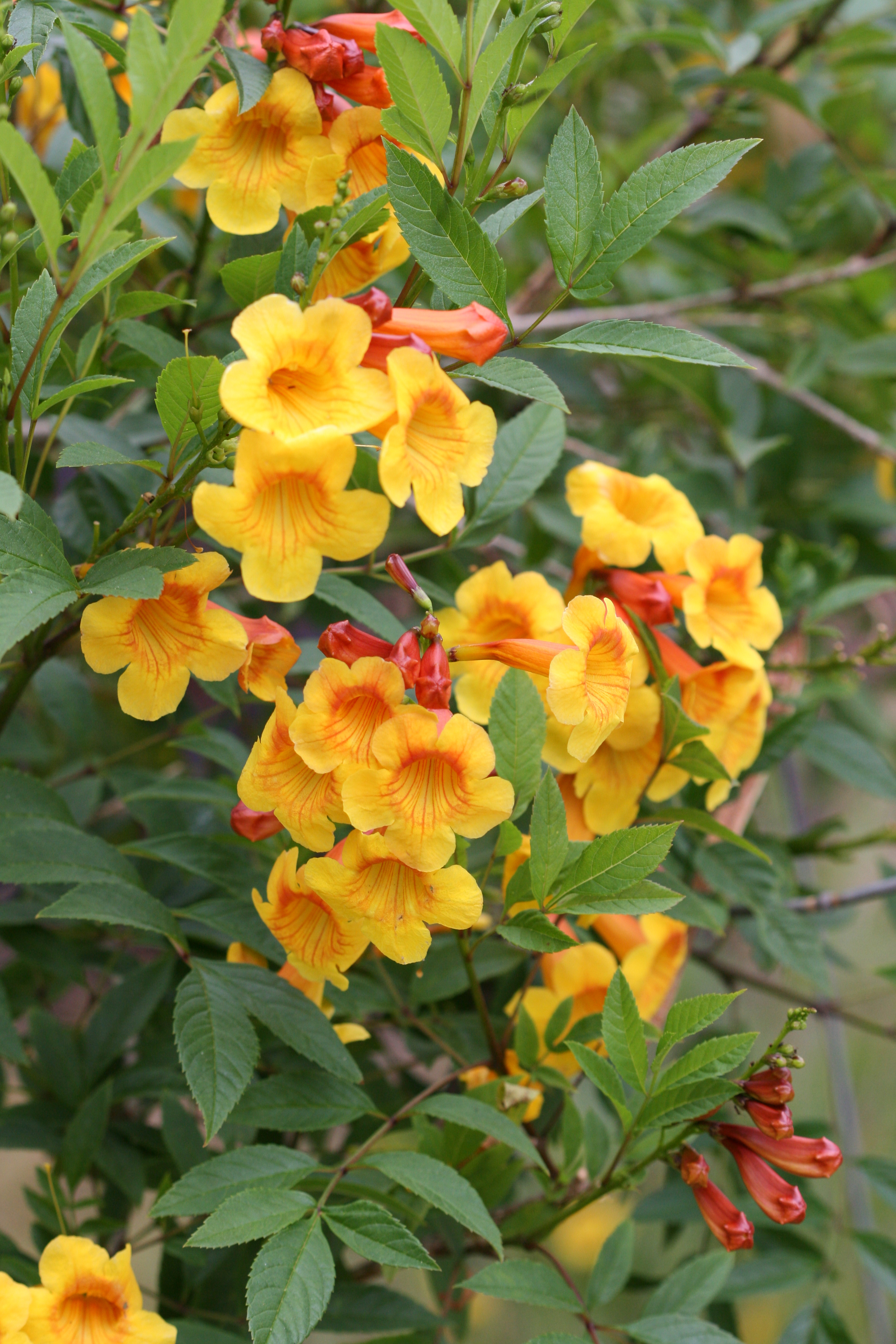
- Tecoma fulva subsp. guarume cultivar 'Flaming Belles'

Scientific classification
- Kingdom: Plantae
- Clade: Tracheophytes
- Clade: Angiosperms
- Clade: Eudicots
- Clade: Asterids
- Order: Lamiales
- Family: Bignoniaceae
- Genus: Tecoma
- Species: T. fulva

Binomial name
- Tecoma fulva (Cav.) G.Don

Synonyms
- Bignonia fulva Cav.; Bignonia meyeniana Schauer; Gelseminum fulvum (Cav.) Kuntze; Stenolobium fulvum (Cav.) Sprague; Tecomaria fulva (Cav.) Seem.

= Tecoma fulva =

Species of flowering plant

Tecoma fulva is a species of flowering plant native to South America. In the past, several species have been named, which are more recently considered to be subspecies.

- Tecoma fulva subsp. fulva
- Tecoma fulva subsp. altoandina J. R. I. Wood
- Tecoma fulva subsp. arequipensis (Sprague) J.R.I.Wood
- Tecoma fulva subsp. garrocha (Hieron.) J.R.I.Wood
- Tecoma fulva subsp. guarume (DC.) J.R.I.Wood
- Tecoma fulva subsp. tanaeciiflora (Kraenzl.) J.R.I.Wood
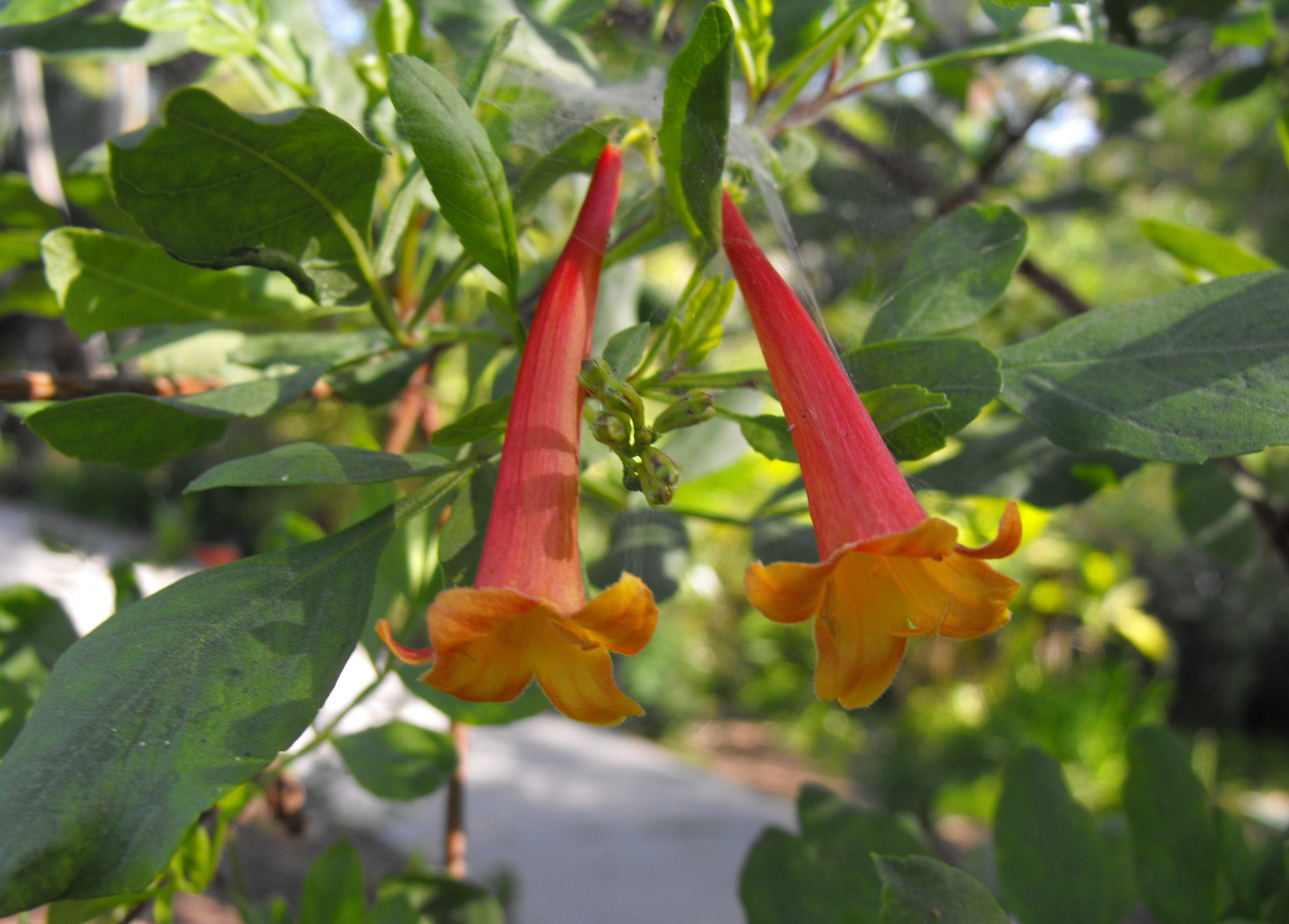
subspecies arequipensis
