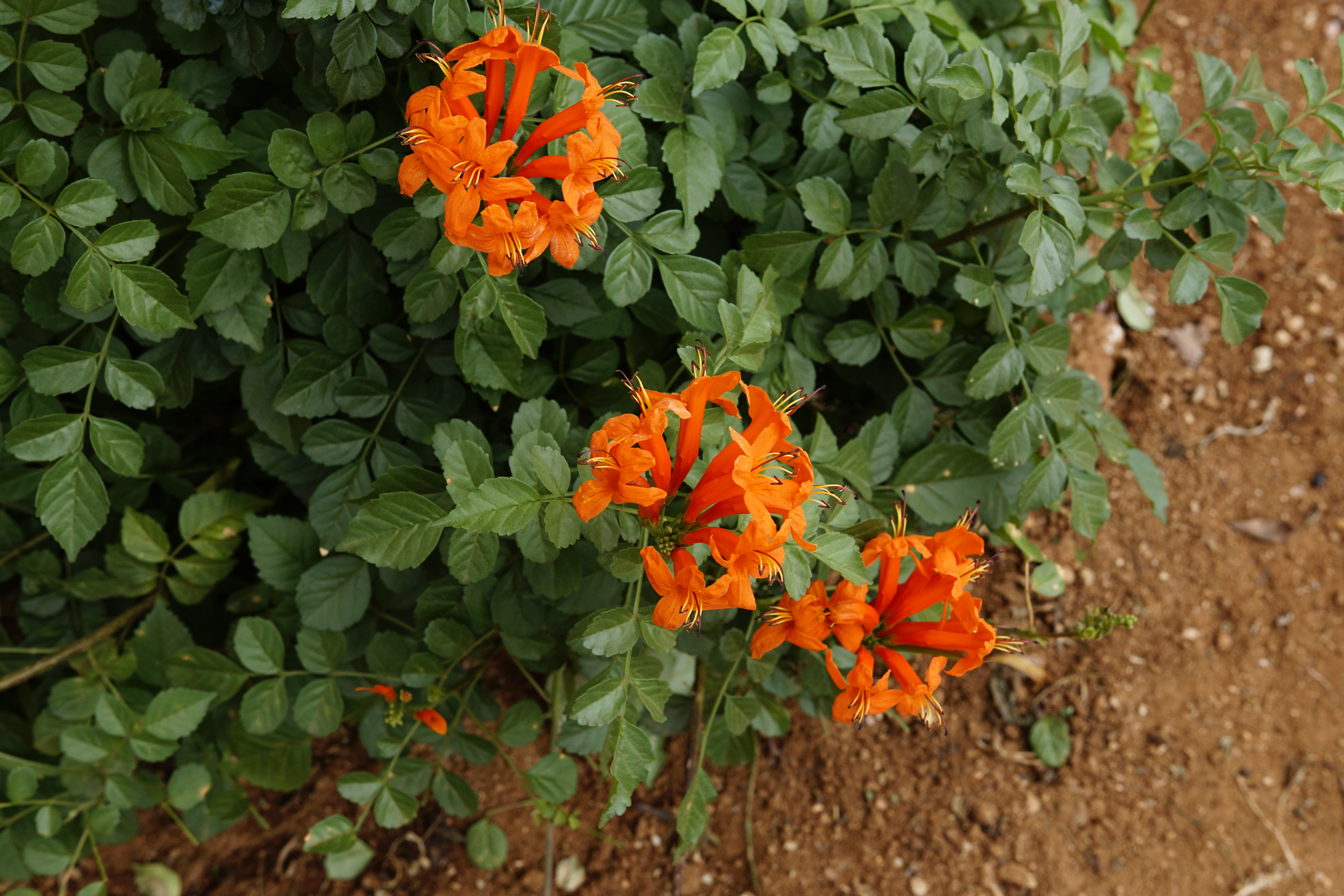

Conservation status
- Least Concern (IUCN 3.1)

- Least Concern (SANBI Red List)

Scientific classification
- Kingdom: Plantae
- Clade: Tracheophytes
- Clade: Angiosperms
- Clade: Eudicots
- Clade: Asterids
- Order: Lamiales
- Family: Bignoniaceae
- Genus: Tecomaria
- Species: T. capensis

Binomial name
- Tecomaria capensis (Thunb.) Spach (1840)

Synonyms
- Bignonia capensis Thunb. (1794); Ducoudraea capensis Bureau (1864); Gelseminum capense (Thunb.) Kuntze (1891); Tecoma capensis (Thunb.) Lindl. (1828); Tecoma petersii Klotzsch (1861); Tecomaria krebsii Klotzsch (1861); Tecomaria petersii Klotzsch (1861)

= Tecomaria capensis =

Species of flowering plant

Tecomaria capensis, the Cape honeysuckle, is a species of flowering plant in the family Bignoniaceae, native to southern Africa. Despite its common name, it is not closely related to the true honeysuckle.

== Description ==
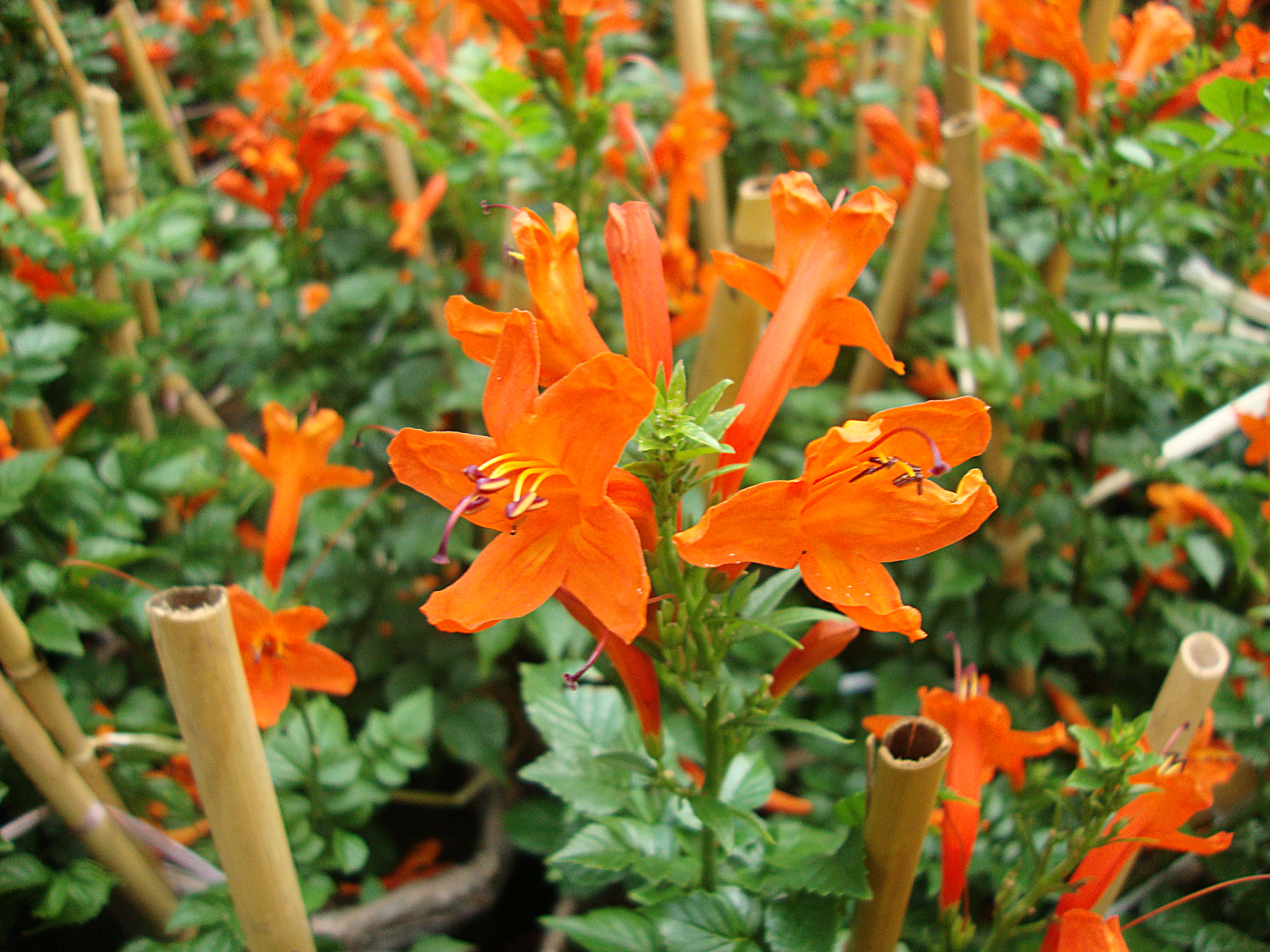
Flowers

An erect, scrambling shrub, it grows to 2–3 m (7–10 ft) in height and a similar width. Normally evergreen, it may lose its leaves in colder climates. In certain habitats it may scramble, meaning that it shoots out long growth tips which lean on the stems and branches of other plants, as well as boulders, trellises, fences and walls; this can lead to the plant appearing untidy.

The leaves are up to 15 cm (6 in) long. They are opposite, slightly serrated, green to dark-green, and pinnate with 5 to 9 oblong leaflets.

=== Flowers ===
The flowers are tubular, narrow, about 7.5 cm (3 in) long, and are produced erratically at different times throughout the year, though they typically bloom from autumn to spring. They are grouped in 10–15 cm (4–6 in) long terminal clusters. The flower colour ranges from orange to orange-red to apricot.

== Distribution ==
The species occurs naturally in parts of southern and central Africa, including South Africa, Eswatini, Mozambique, Malawi, Tanzania, Democratic Republic of the Congo, and Angola.

It is cultivated in other areas of the world, such as in South-east Asia, the South of France, Hawaii, Florida, and California. It can be considered invasive in remote islands such as the Azores (as seen at the island of São Miguel, near Ponta Garça).

== Cultivation ==
Tecomaria capensis has been in cultivation for many years and is often used for hedging, as it is a scrambling shrub. It can be propagated from cuttings or by removing rooted suckers during the active growth phase.

It can be planted in semi-shade to full sun. Tolerating temperatures down to 5 °C (41 °F), it can be grown in mild temperate areas with the protection of a warm wall. Otherwise it can be grown in a container and taken indoors through the winter months. Any type of compost enriched soil works well.To keep this shrub clean and tidy, it must be pruned back in late winter to promote new growth and flowers. The application of a balanced fertilizer after pruning will enhance the growth and flowering. During the summer months it requires a lot of water, for best results.

This plant has gained the Royal Horticultural Society's Award of Garden Merit.

== Ecology ==
Tecomaria capensis is an excellent plant to use in a wildlife garden in Southern Africa, since it is popular with sunbirds and certain insects due to its nectar. As a scrambler, it can be quite dense (if pruned) and as such can be utilised as a nesting site by a few bird species.

The larvae of the death's head hawkmoth (Acherontia atropos) and the fulvous hawkmoth (Coelonia mauritii) eat the leaves of this plant.

== Gallery ==
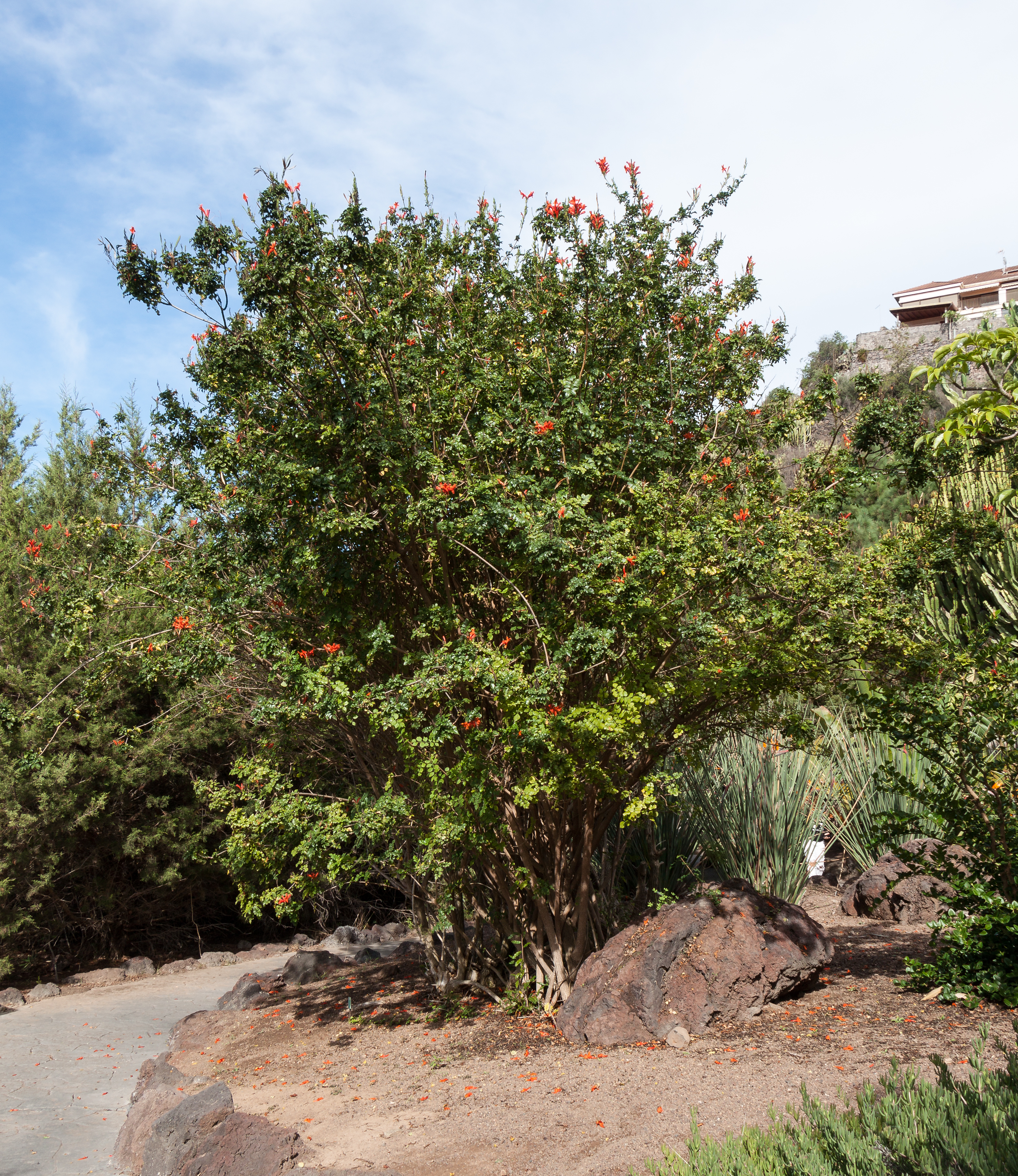
Habitus

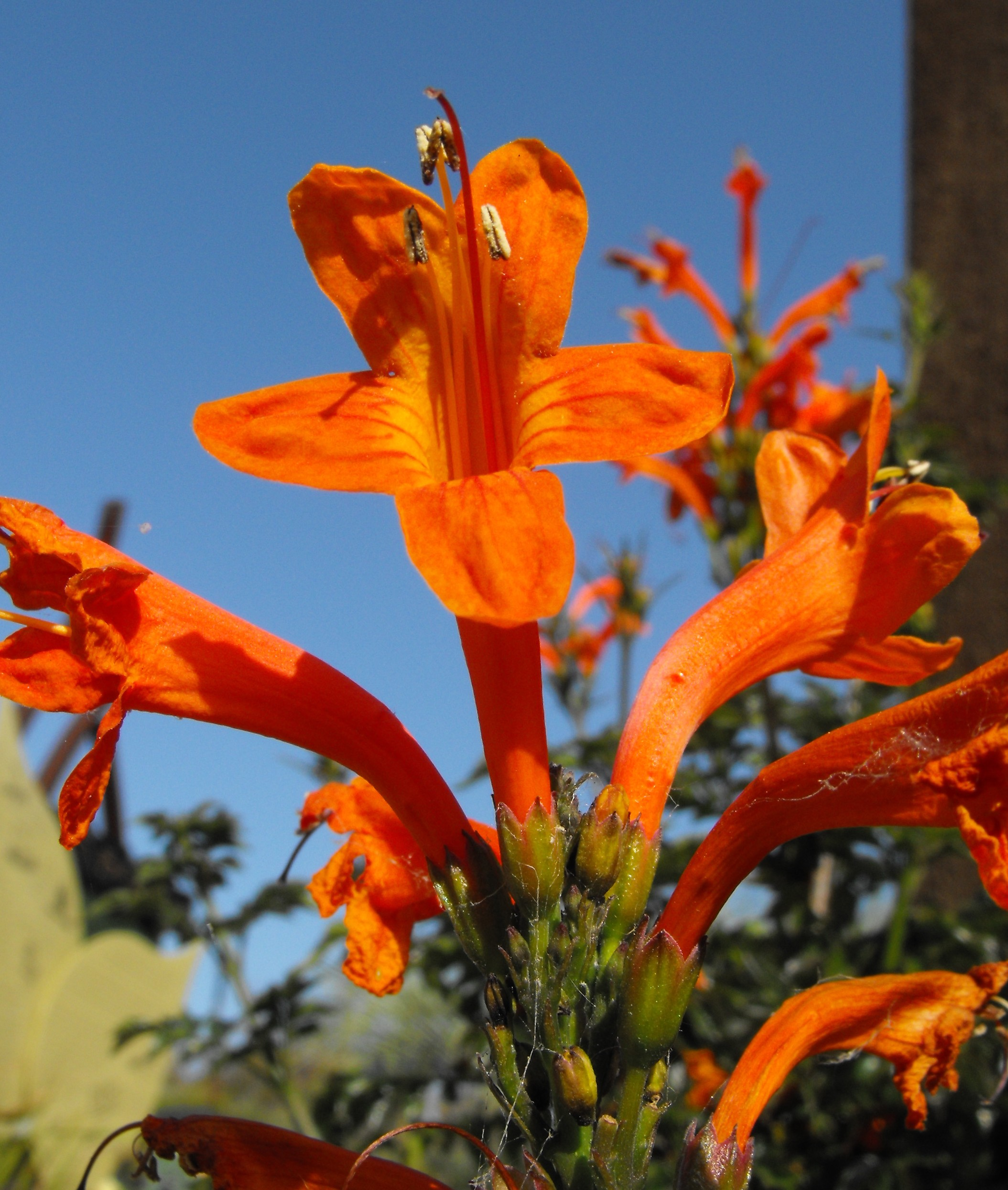
Close-up of flower

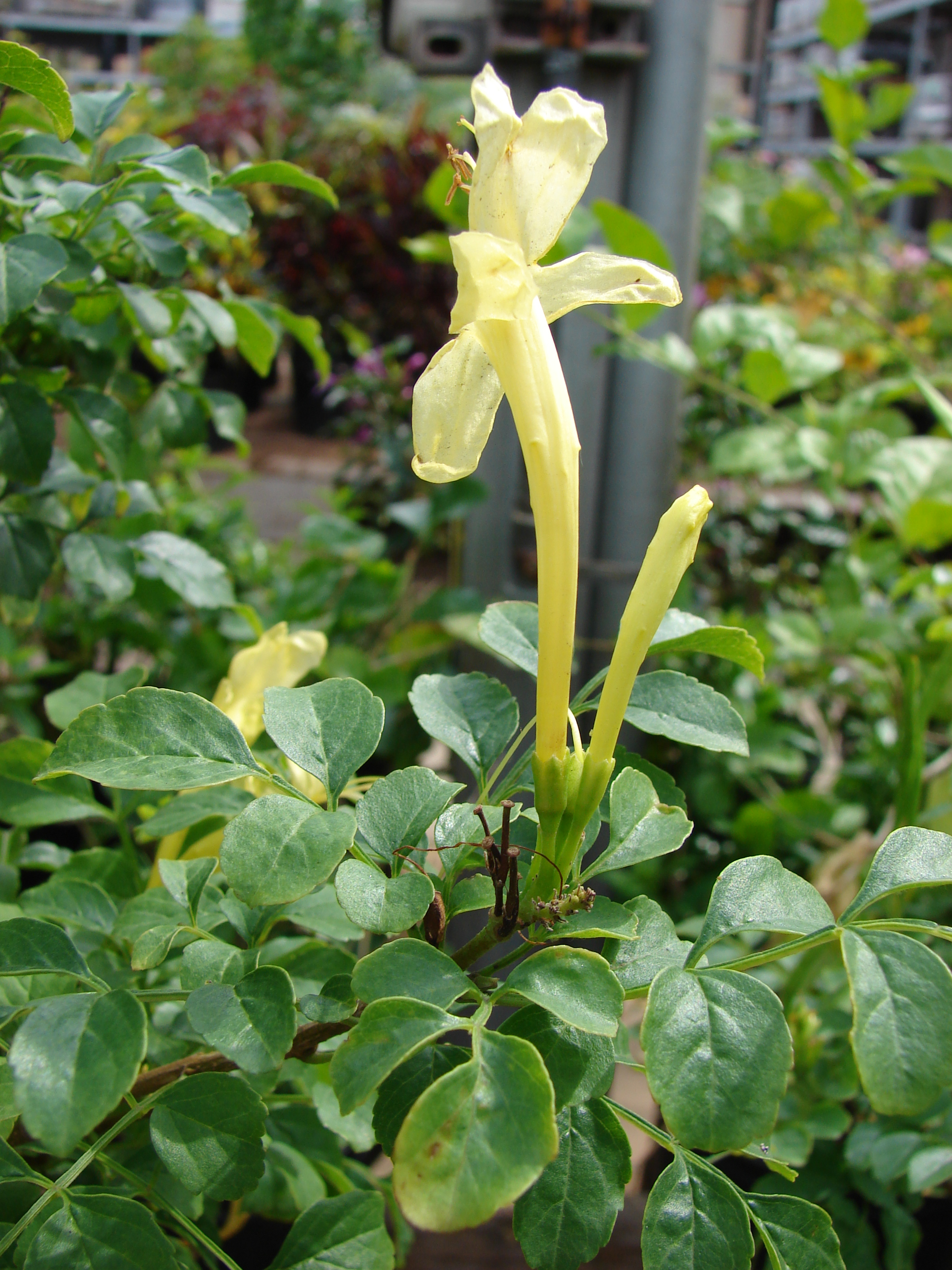
Yellow variety

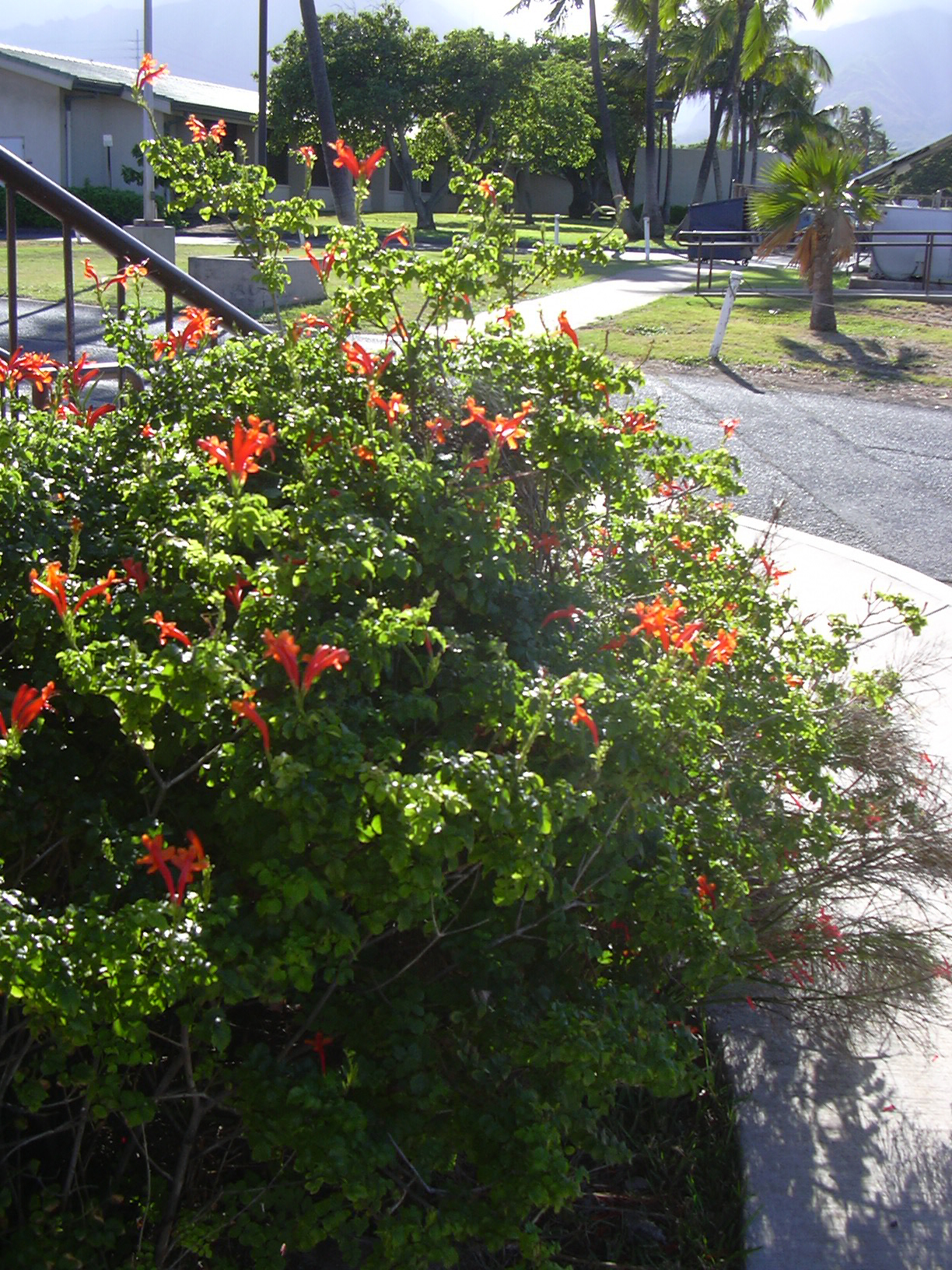
Shrub

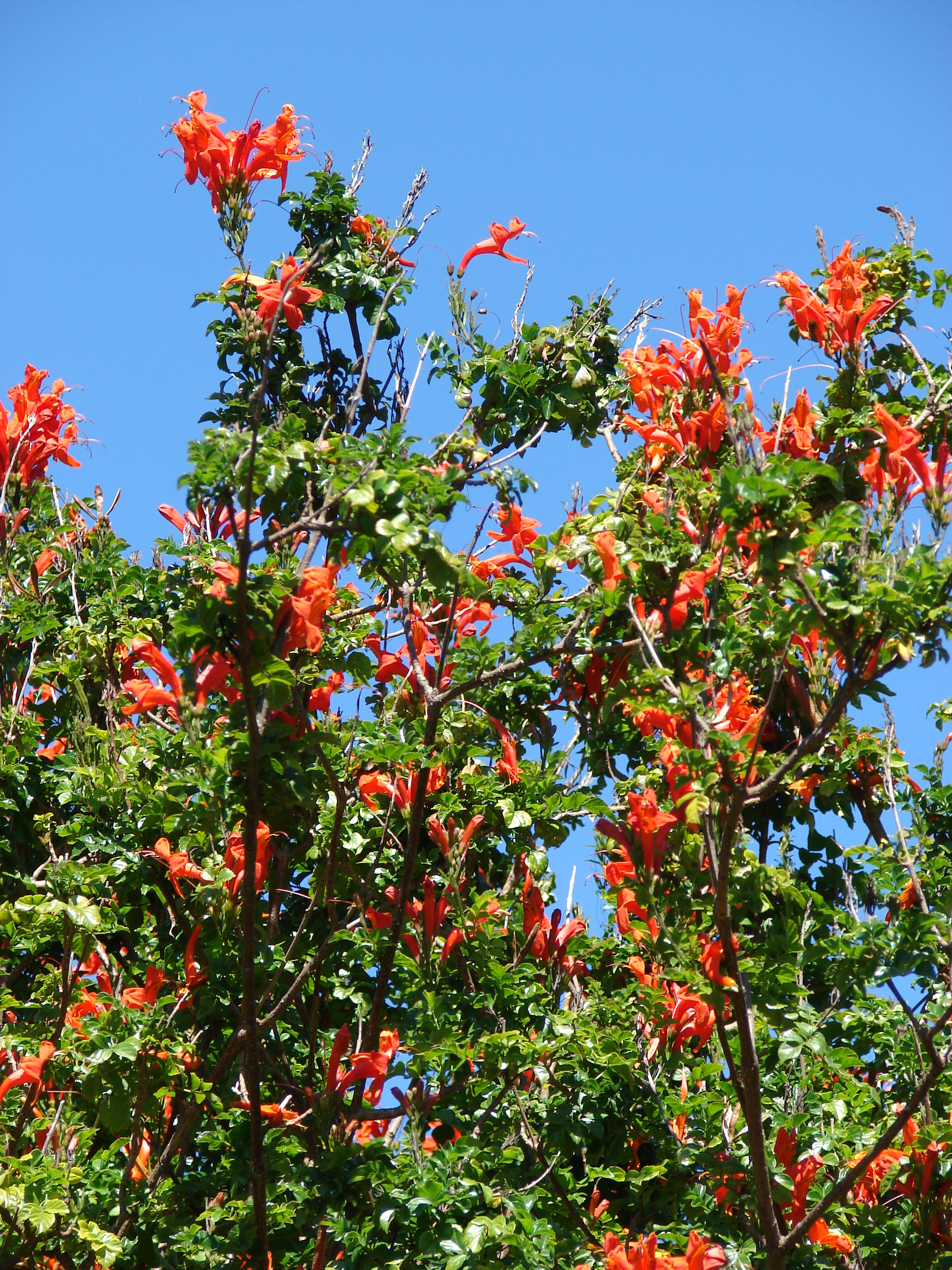
Maui, Enchanting Floral Gardens of Kula

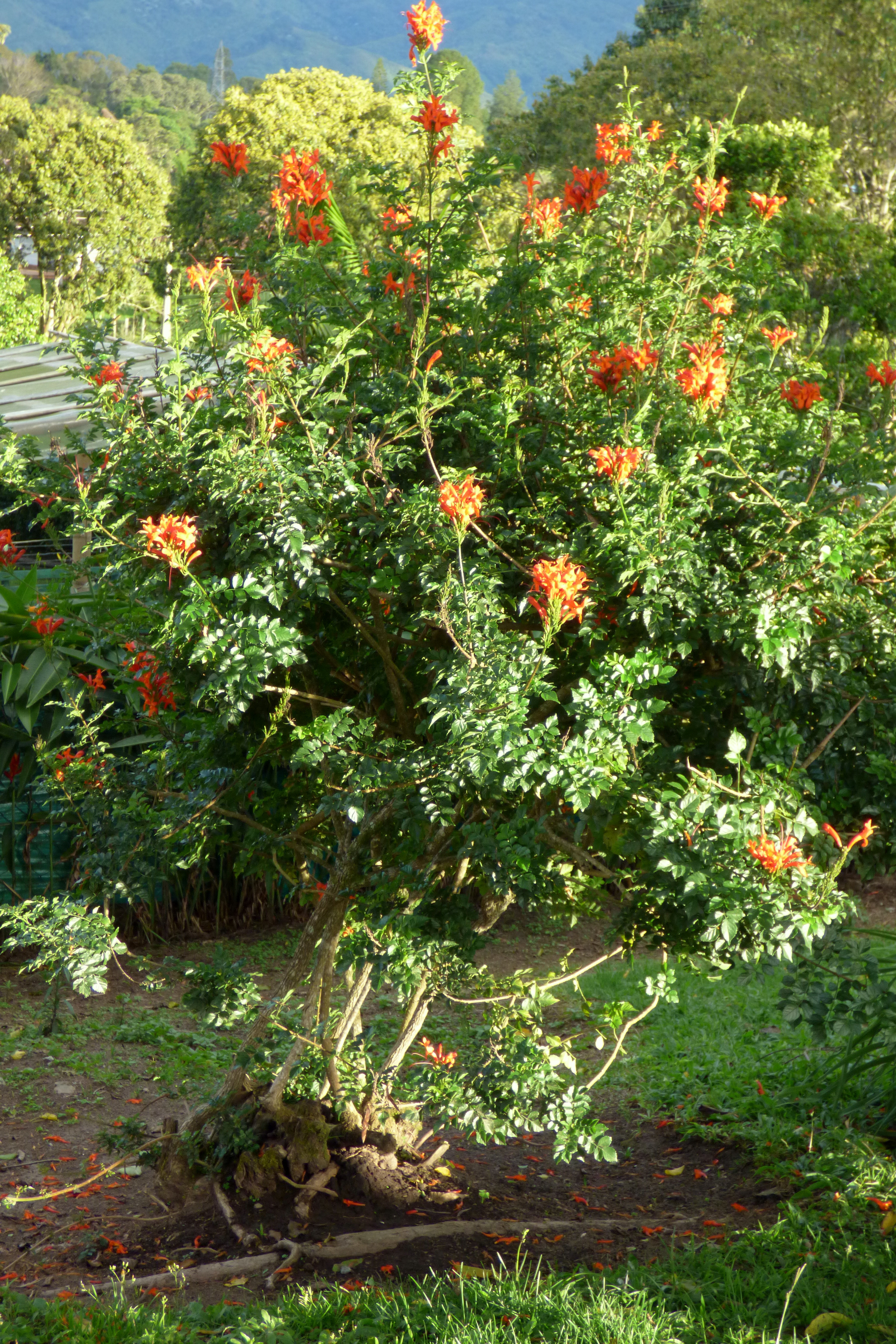
Large shrub

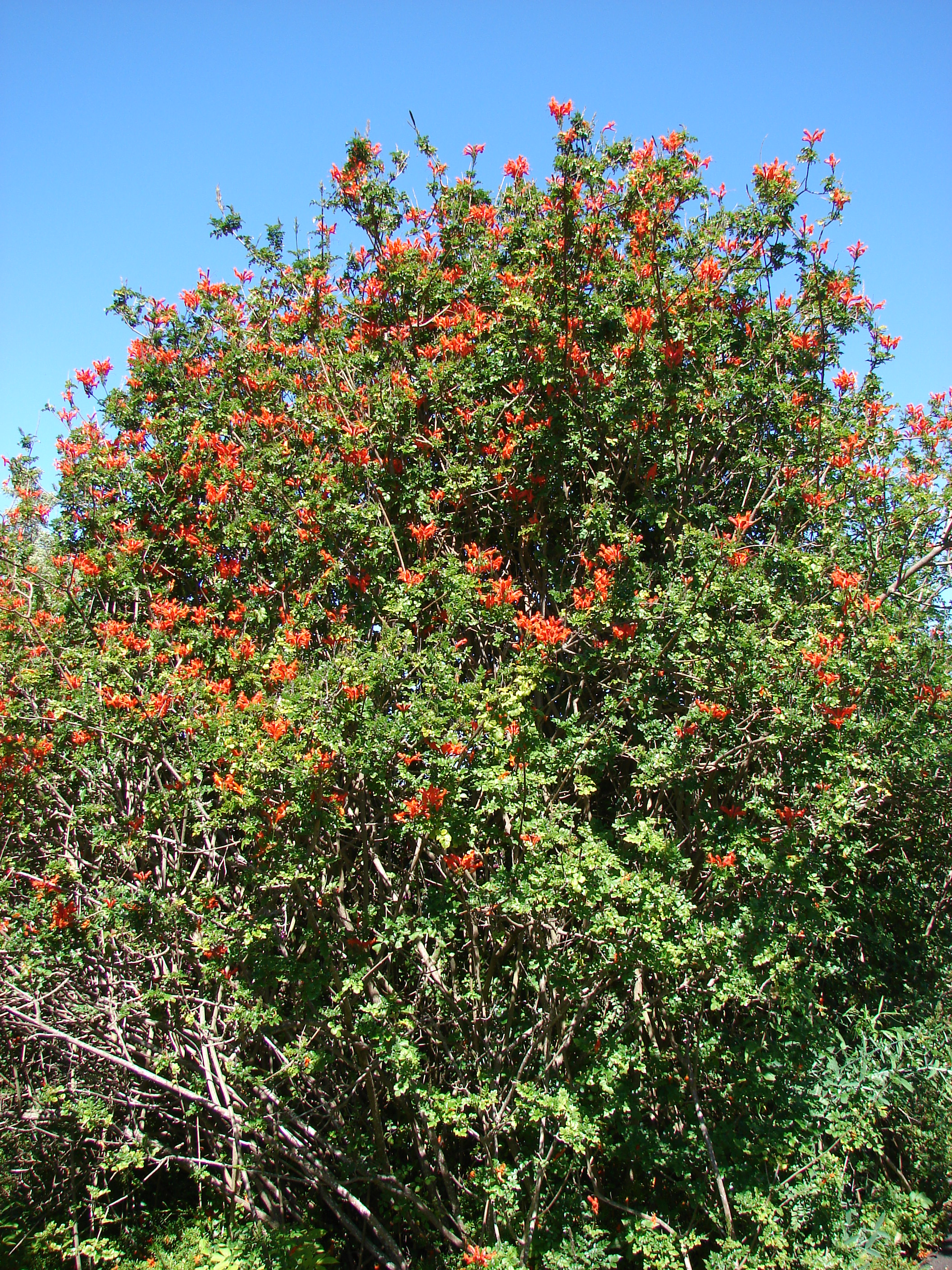
Small tree
