= Tecomaria nyassae =

Scientific classification
- Kingdom: Plantae
- Clade: Tracheophytes
- Clade: Angiosperms
- Clade: Eudicots
- Clade: Asterids
- Order: Lamiales
- Family: Bignoniaceae
- Genus: Tecomaria
- Species: T. nyassae

Binomial name
- Tecomaria nyassae (Oliv.) Baill.

Synonyms
- Tecoma nyassae Oliv. (1881); Tecomaria capensis subsp. nyassae (Oliv.) Brummitt (1974); Tecoma nyikensis Baker (1898); Tecoma shirensis Baker (1894); Tecoma whytei C.H.Wright (1897); Tecomaria rupium Bullock (1931); Tecomaria schirensis Engl. & K.Schum. (1895)

Species of flowering plant

Tecomaria nyassae is a species of flowering plant in the family Bignoniaceae. The species is native to parts of southern and central Africa. The name refers to the area around Lake Nyassa also known as Lake Malawi.

== Distribution ==
The species occurs naturally in parts of southern and central Africa, including Northeastern Angola, Democratic Republic of the Congo, Malawi, Mozambique, Tanzania, and Zambia.
