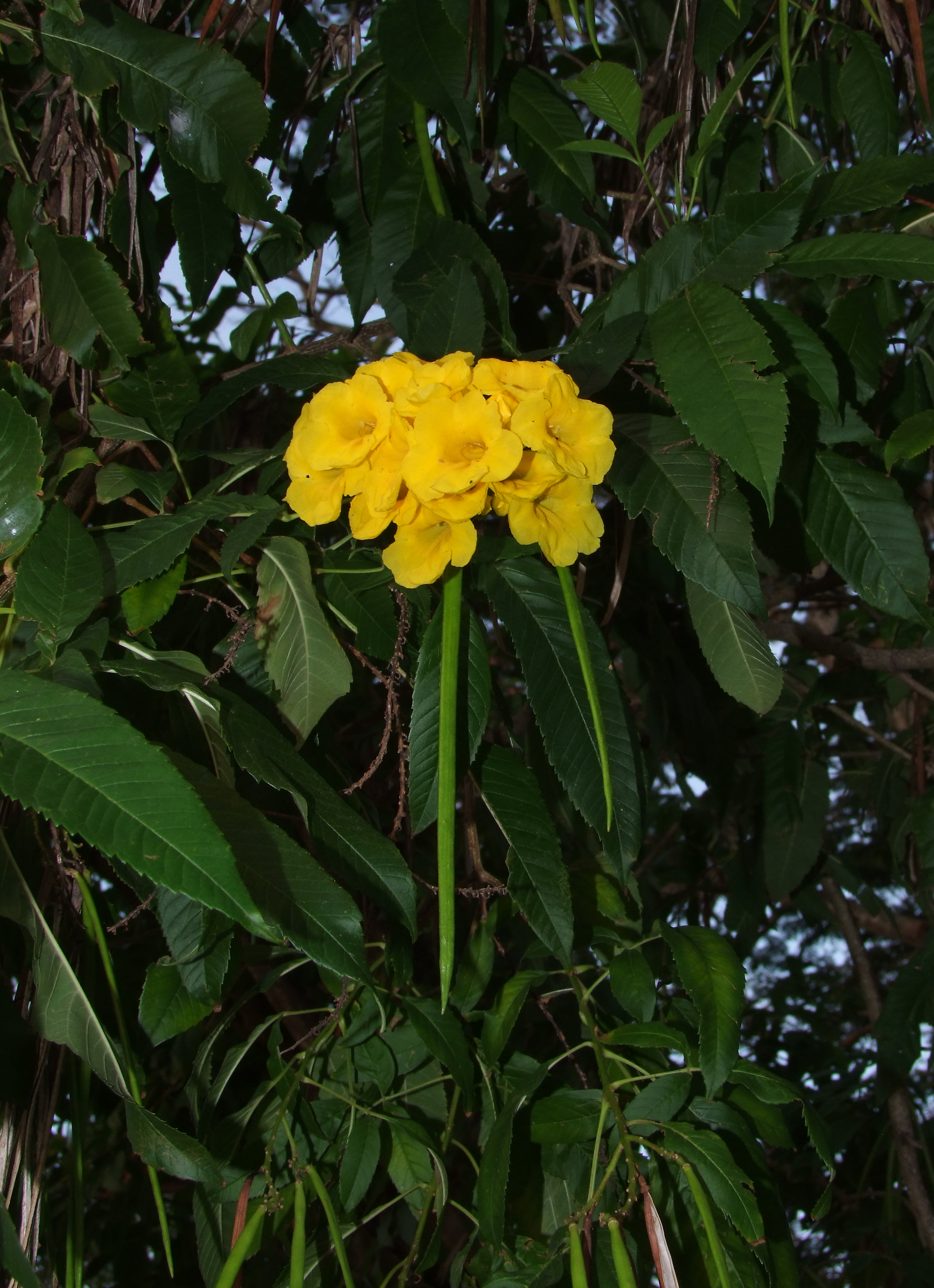

Scientific classification
- Kingdom: Plantae
- Clade: Tracheophytes
- Clade: Angiosperms
- Clade: Eudicots
- Clade: Asterids
- Order: Lamiales
- Family: Bignoniaceae
- Genus: Tecoma
- Species: T. castanifolia

Binomial name
- Tecoma castanifolia (D.Don) Melch.

Synonyms
- Bignonia castaneifolia (D.Don) DC.; Bignonia serrata Pav. ex G.Don; Delostoma stenolobium Steud.; Gelseminum gaudichaudii (DC.) Kuntze; Kokoschkinia paniculata Turcz.; Stenolobium castanifolium D.Don; Tecoma gaudichaudii DC.

= Tecoma castanifolia =

Species of flowering plant

Tecoma castanifolia is a species of flowering plant native to Ecuador and Peru. Unlike some other Tecoma species, the leaves are simple.
