= Tecoma beckii =

Scientific classification
- Kingdom: Plantae
- Clade: Tracheophytes
- Clade: Angiosperms
- Clade: Eudicots
- Clade: Asterids
- Order: Lamiales
- Family: Bignoniaceae
- Genus: Tecoma
- Species: T. beckii

Binomial name
- Tecoma beckii J.R.I.Wood

Species of flowering plant

Tecoma beckii is a species of flowering plants native to Bolivia. Unlike some other Tecoma species, the leaves are simple.
