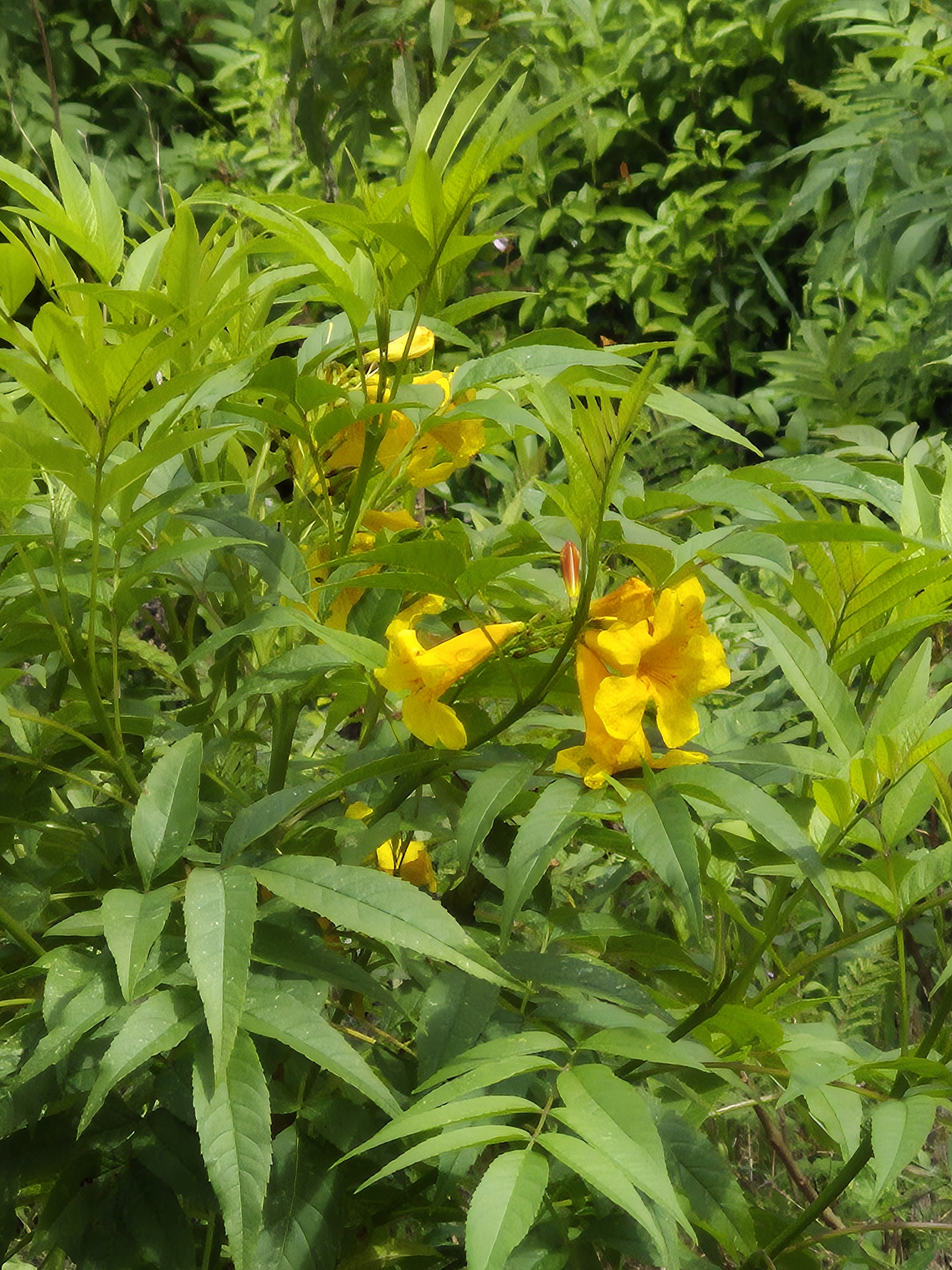
- Flowers and leaves

Conservation status
- Least Concern (IUCN 3.1)

Scientific classification
- Kingdom: Plantae
- Clade: Embryophytes
- Clade: Tracheophytes
- Clade: Spermatophytes
- Clade: Angiosperms
- Clade: Eudicots
- Clade: Asterids
- Order: Lamiales
- Family: Bignoniaceae
- Genus: Tecoma
- Species: T. stans

Binomial name
- Tecoma stans (L.) Juss. ex Kunth

Synonyms
- Bignonia frutescens Mill. Synonym; Bignonia incisa DC. [Invalid] Synonym; Bignonia sorbifolia Salisb. Synonym; Bignonia stans L. Synonym; Bignonia tecoma Wehmer Synonym; Bignonia tecomoides DC. Synonym; Gelseminum stans (L.) Kuntze Synonym; Stenolobium incisum Rose & Standl. Synonym; Stenolobium quinquejugum Loes. Synonym; Stenolobium stans (L.) Seem. Synonym; Stenolobium stans var. apiifolium (DC.) Seem. Synonym; Stenolobium stans var. multijugum R.E.Fr. Synonym; Stenolobium stans var. pinnatum Seem. Synonym; Stenolobium tronadora Loes. Synonym; Tecoma incisa (Rose & Standl.) I.M.Johnst. Synonym; Tecoma molle Kunth Synonym; Tecoma stans var. angustatum Rehder Synonym; Tecoma stans var. apiifolia DC. Synonym; Tecoma stans var. stans Synonym; Tecoma tronadora (Loes.) I.M.Johnst. Synonym; Tecoma velutina Lindl. Synonym

= Tecoma stans =

Species of tree

Tecoma stans is a species of flowering perennial shrub in the trumpet vine family, Bignoniaceae, that is native to the Americas. Common names include yellow trumpetbush, yellow bells, yellow elder, ginger Thomas. Tecoma stans is the official flower of the United States Virgin Islands and the floral emblem of The Bahamas.

== Description ==
Tecoma stans is a semi-evergreen shrub or small tree, growing up to 10 m (30 ft) tall. It features opposite odd-pinnate green leaves, with 3 to 13 serrate, 8- to 10-cm-long leaflets. The leaflets, glabrous on both sides, have a lanceolate blade 2–10 cm long and 1–4 cm wide, with a long acuminate apex and a wedge-shaped base.

The large, showy, golden yellow, trumpet-shaped flowers are in clusters at the ends of branches. The corolla of the flower is bell- to funnel-shaped, five-lobed (weakly two-lipped), often reddish-veined in the throat and is 3.5 to 8.5 cm long. Flowering takes place from spring to fall, but more profusely from spring to summer.

The fruits, narrow capsules, arise from two carpels and are up to 25 cm long. A fruit contains many yellow seeds with membranopus wings; when the fruit opens upon ripening, these seed are spread by the wind (anemochory). The flowers attract bees, butterflies, and hummingbirds. Apart from sexually by seed, Tecoma stans can also be reproduced asexually by stem cuttings.

== Habitat ==
Tecoma stans is native to the Americas. It extends from the southern United States through Mexico, Central America, and the Antilles to northern Venezuela, and through the Andes mountain range to northern Argentina. It was introduced in southern Africa, India, and Hawaii. It is evergreen in moist and warmer regions, but is deciduous in more temperate regions that have a pronounced dry season.

Yellow trumpetbush is a ruderal species, readily colonizing disturbed, rocky, sandy, and cleared land and occasionally becoming an invasive weed. It thrives in a wide variety of ecosystems, from high altitude temperate forests and tropical deciduous and evergreen forests, to xerophilous scrub and the intertropical littoral. It quickly colonizes disturbed, rocky, sandy, and cleared fields. The species prefers dry and sunny regions of the coast.

== Cultivation ==
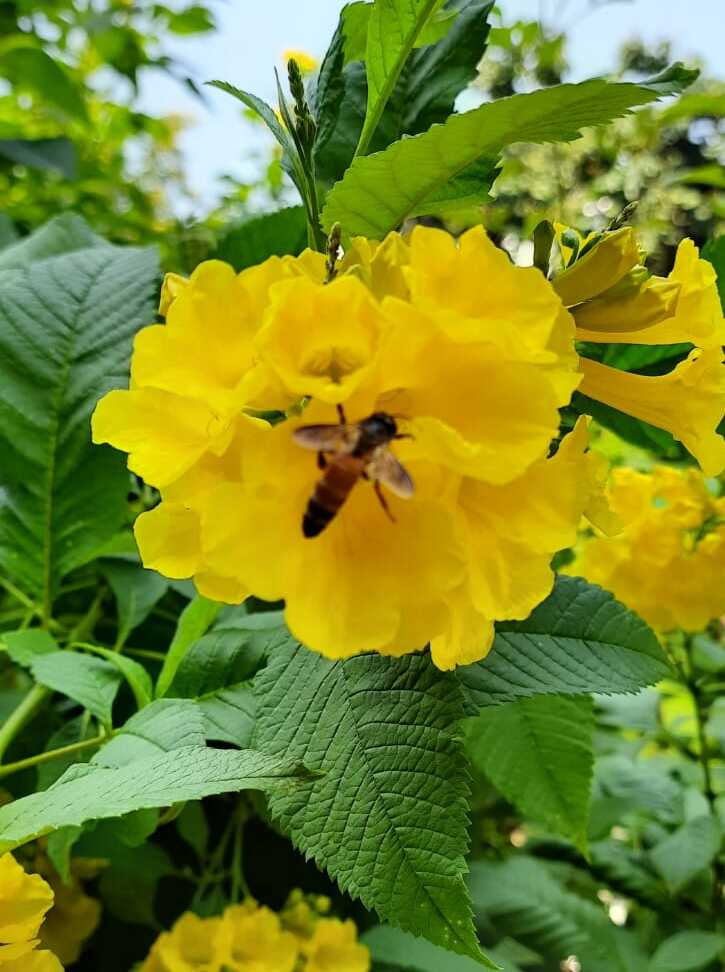
Pollination of the plant by a honey bee

Tecoma stans is drought-tolerant and grows well in warm climates. It is cultivated as an ornamental. They are grown in many parts of the world for their beautiful flowering, to adorn streets and gardens. It can be easily propagated by stem cuttings. Native to the southwestern United States and adjacent Mexico, Tecoma stans var. angustata is shorter and more tolerant of drought and cold than many of the tropical varieties commonly sold in nurseries.

=== Uses ===
The wood of Tecoma stans is used in rustic architecture like bahareque, for the construction of furniture and canoes, or as firewood or charcoal. It is a medicinal plant used against diabetes and against diseases of the digestive system, among other uses. The plant is desirable fodder when it grows in fields grazed by livestock.

It is a very potent anti-venom against cobra venom, used by Pakistani old medicine. It is proved to be better than antiserum, the paste of this plant's leaves are applied topically on the cobra bite. Its bio-chemicals bind with the cobra venom enzymes thus effectively inhibiting the venom.

==== Honey production ====
Tecoma stans is unique in that although it is nontoxic itself, the honey from its flowers is poisonous nonetheless.

== Invasiveness ==
Tecoma stans has invasive potential and occasionally becomes a weed. The species is considered invasive in Africa (especially South Africa), South America, Asia, Australia and the Pacific Islands. It now presents a significant danger for biodiversity. It competes with local species and can form thick, almost monospecific thickets. Seedlings establish speedily with a prominent tap root. The tree can replant from cut roots, thereby causing rapid re-infestation unless the remaining roots are burnt off.

== Gallery ==
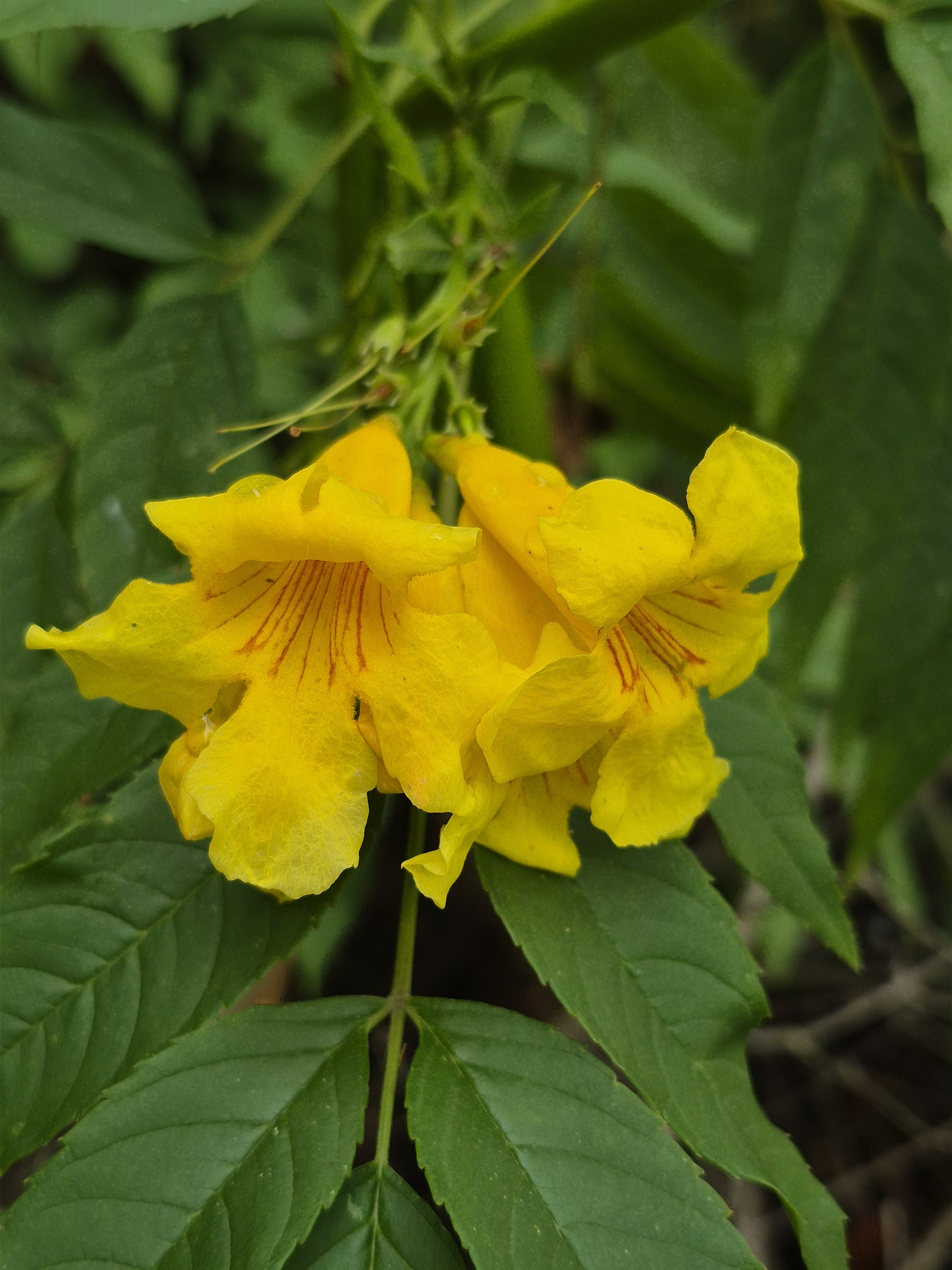
Flowers

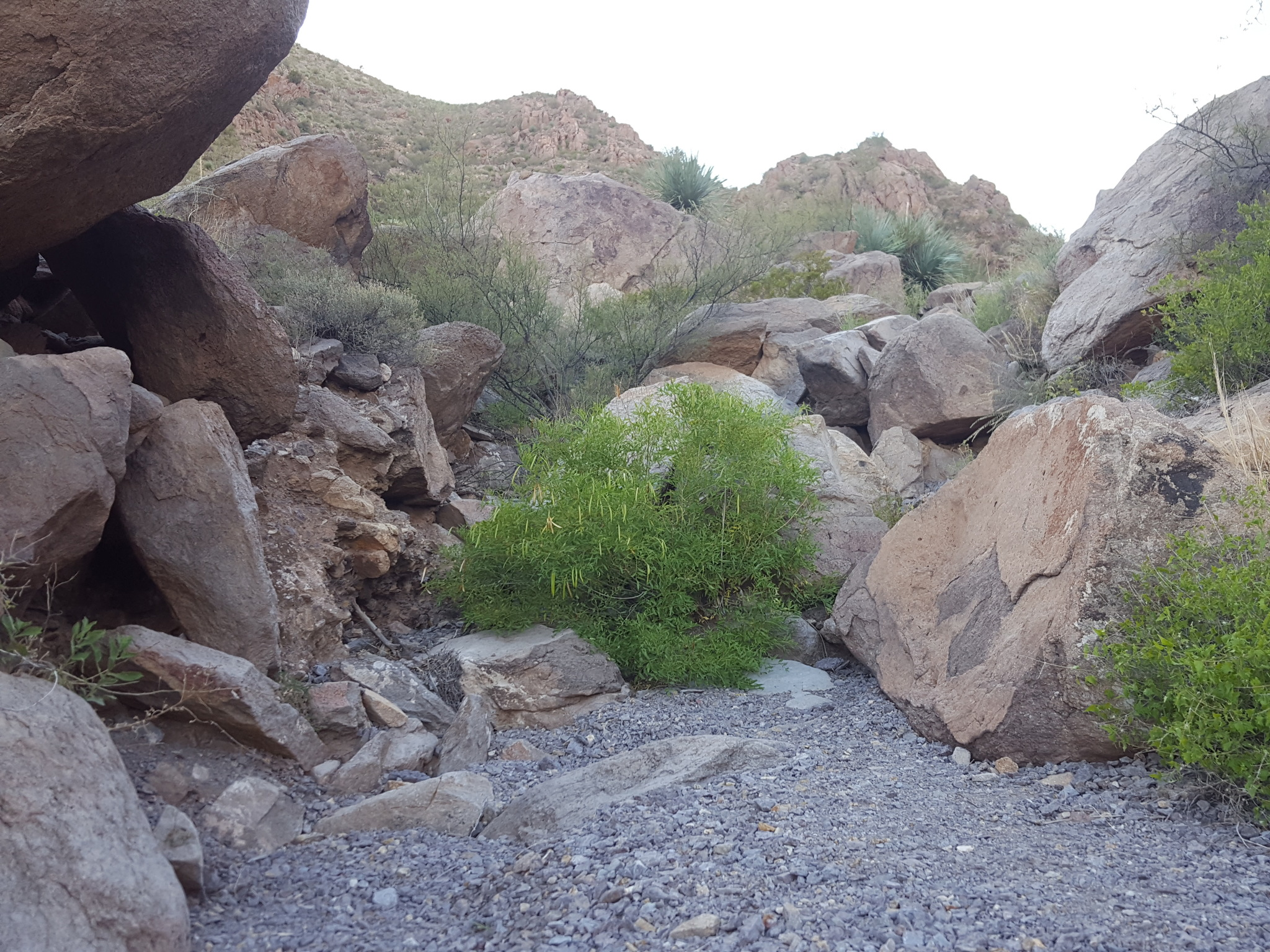
In native habitat

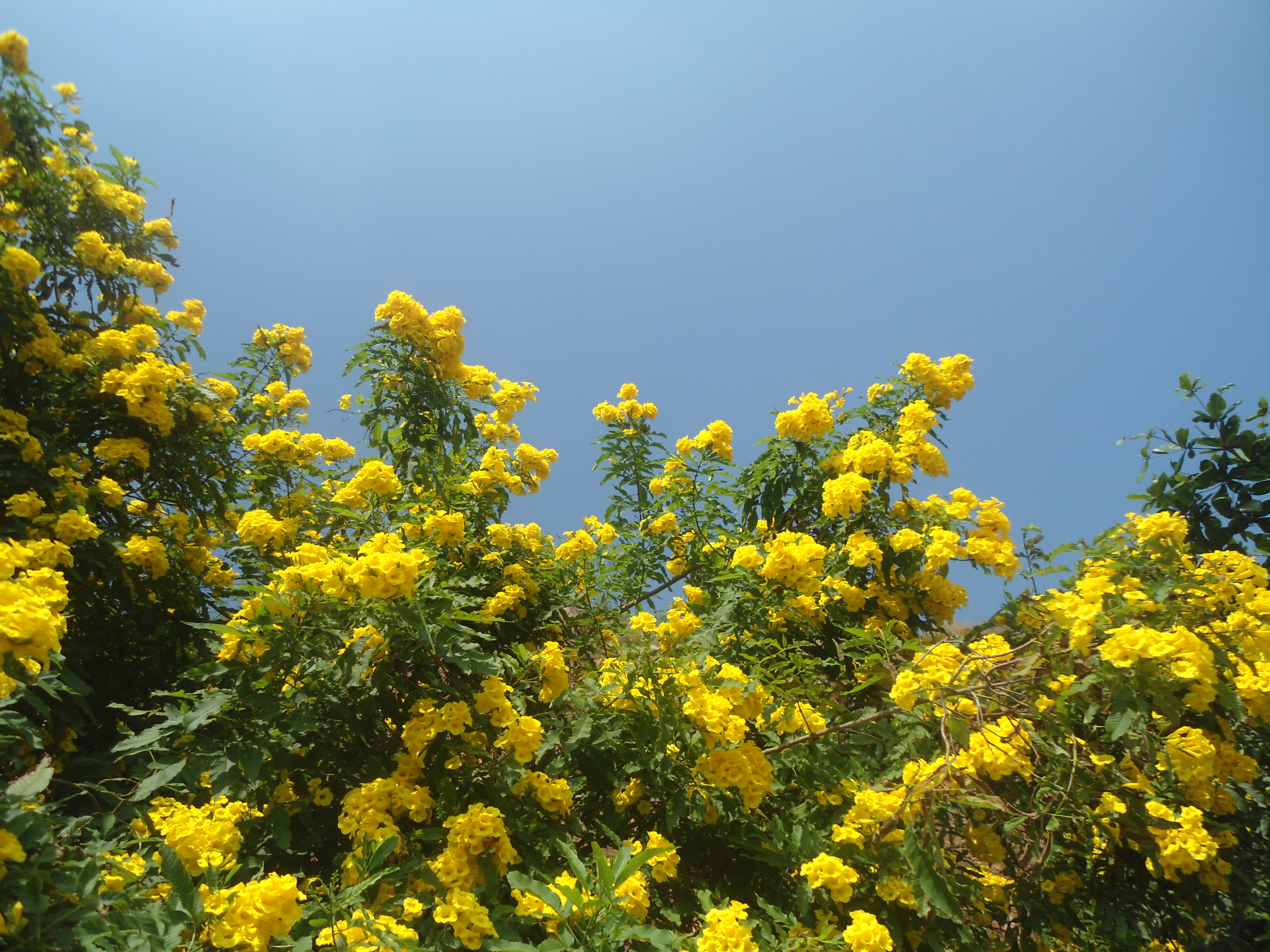
Scrubby bush

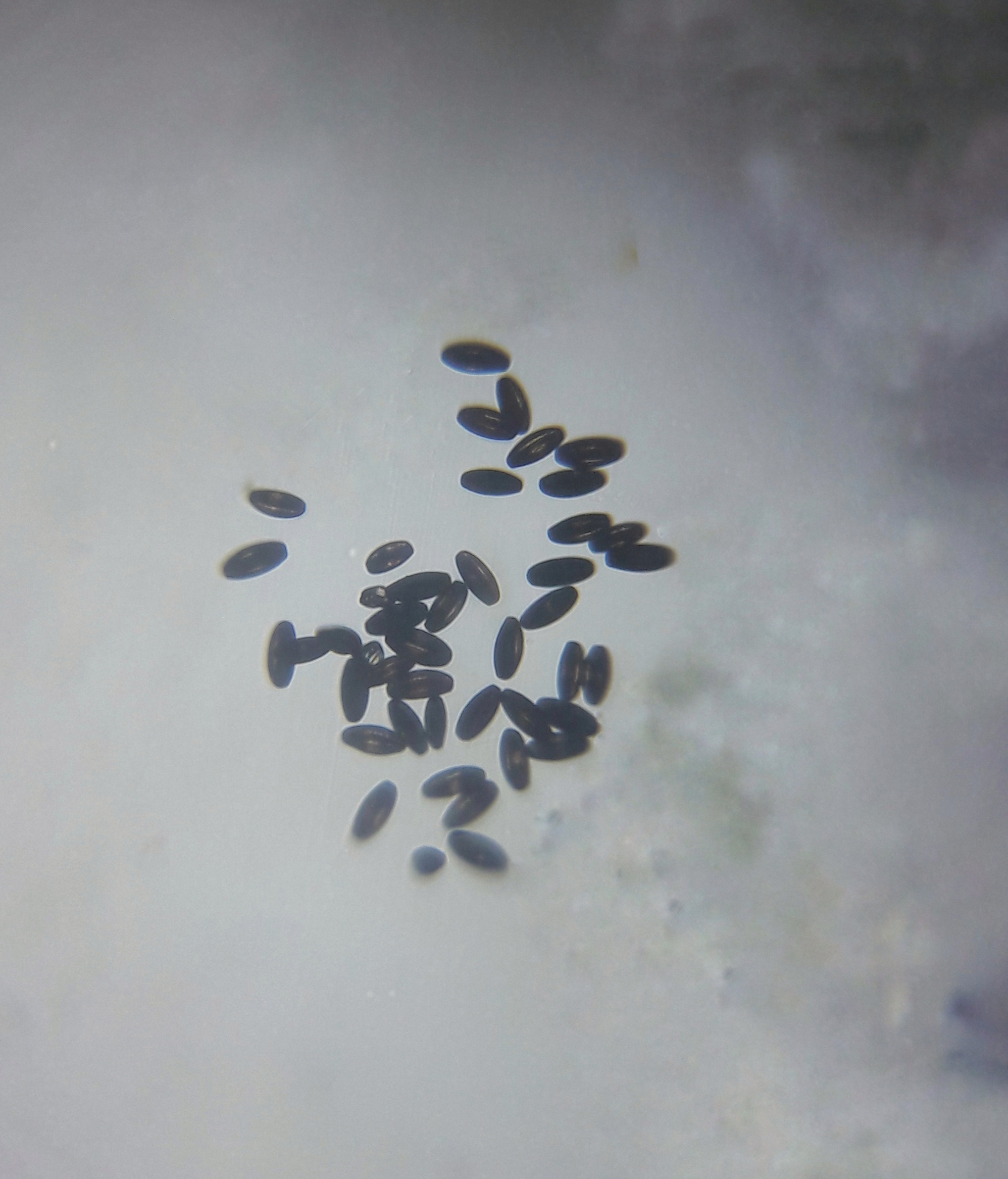
Pollen grain of yellow elder

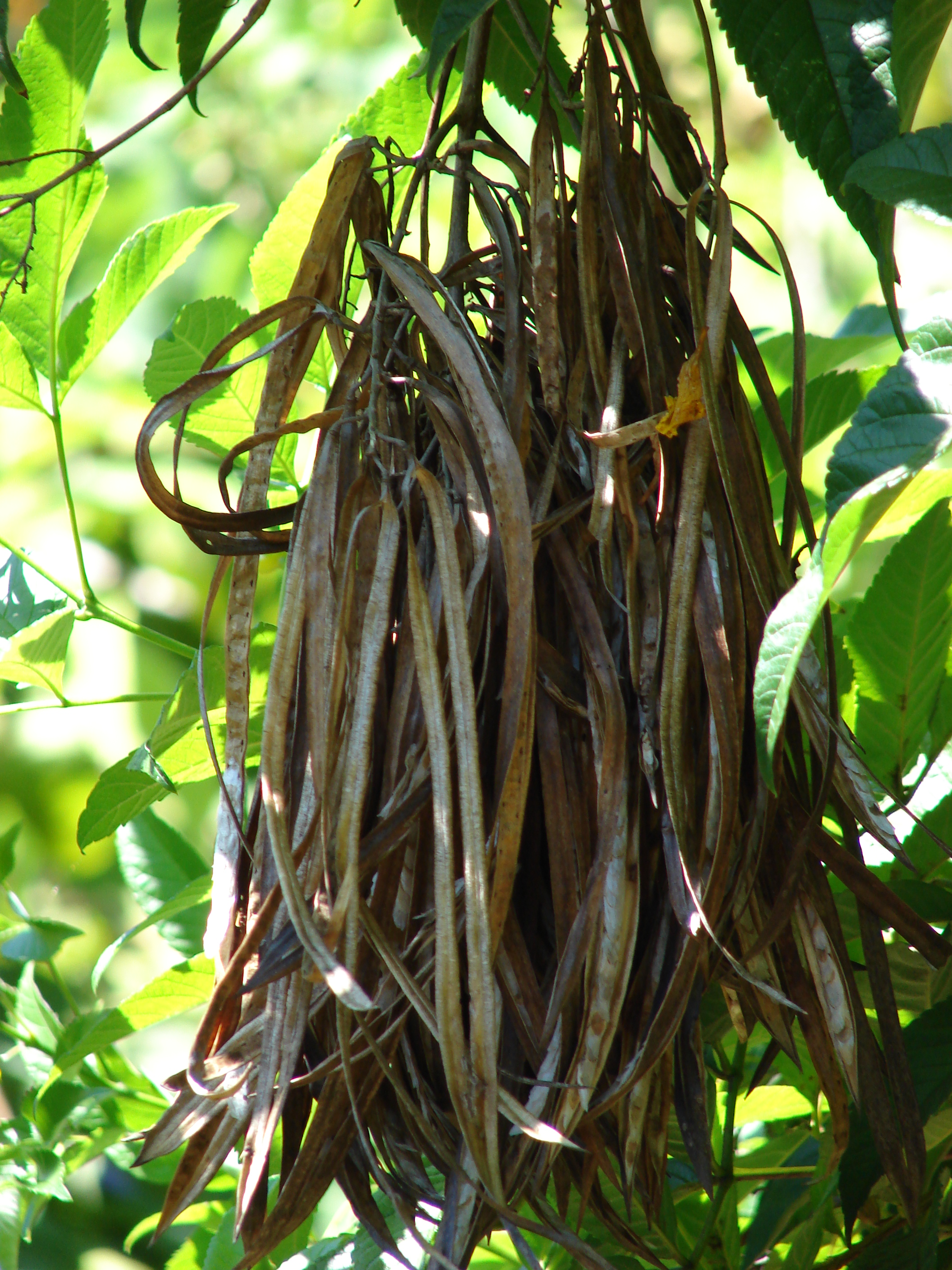
Fruit

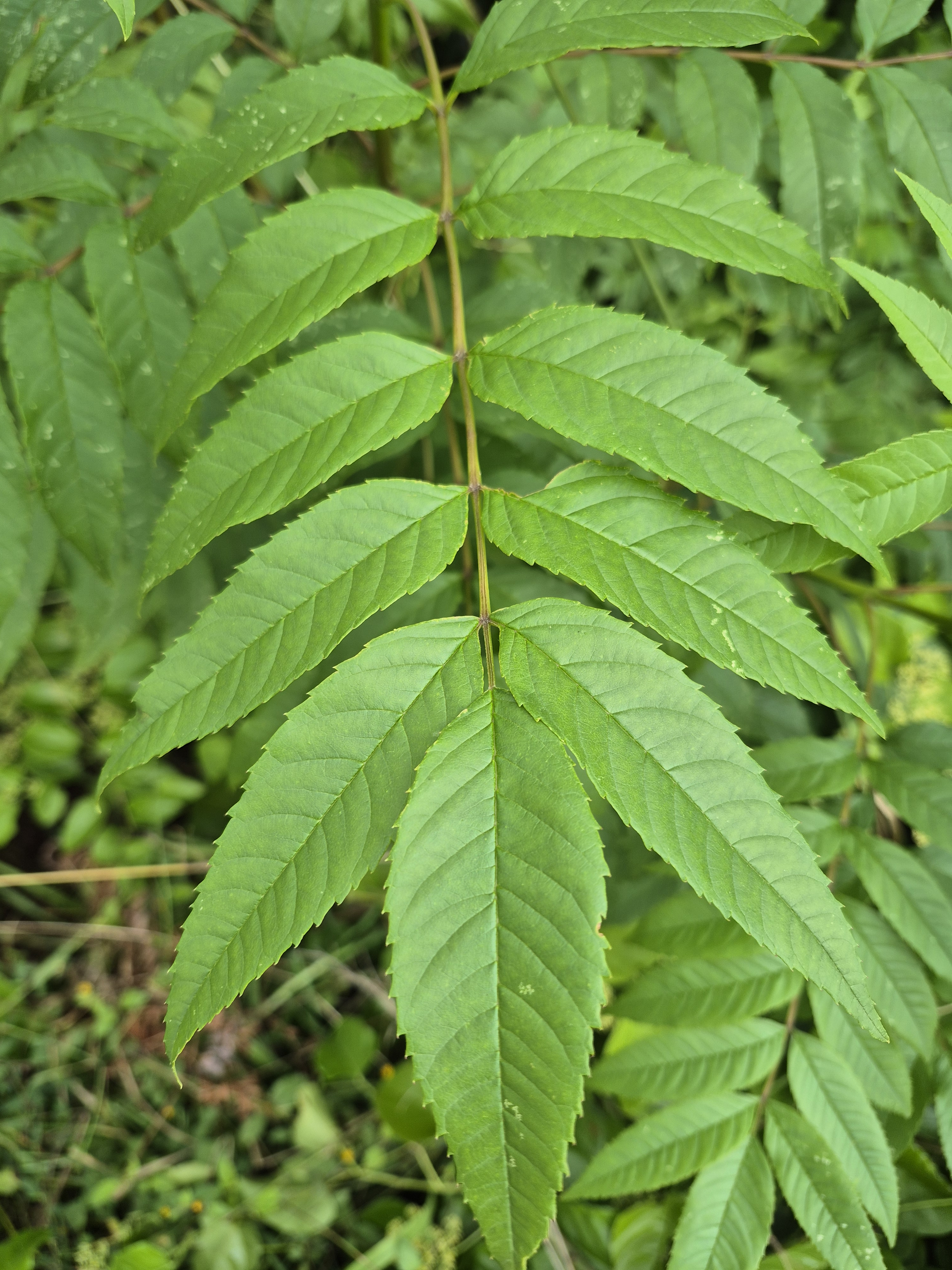
Leaves

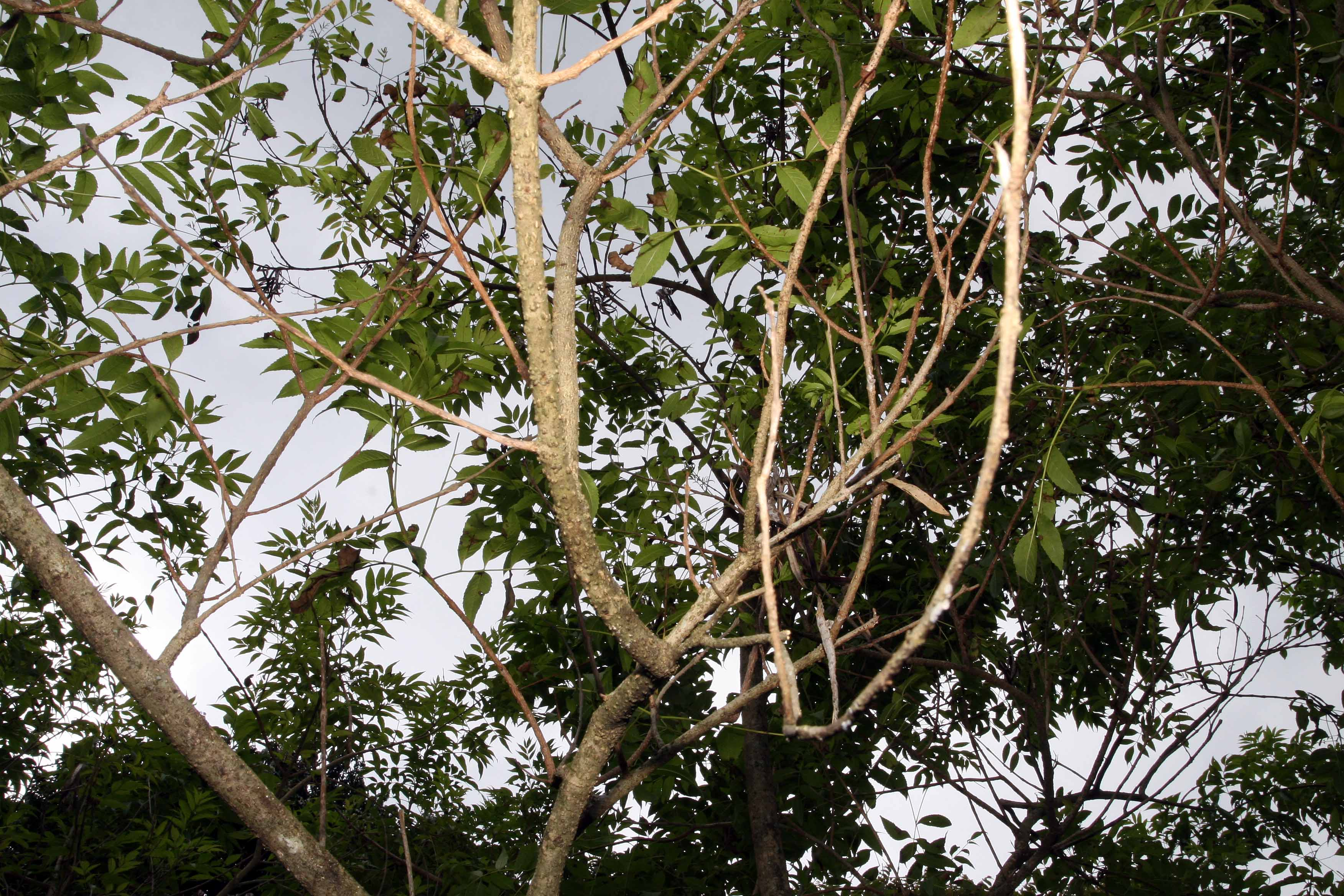
Branching tree

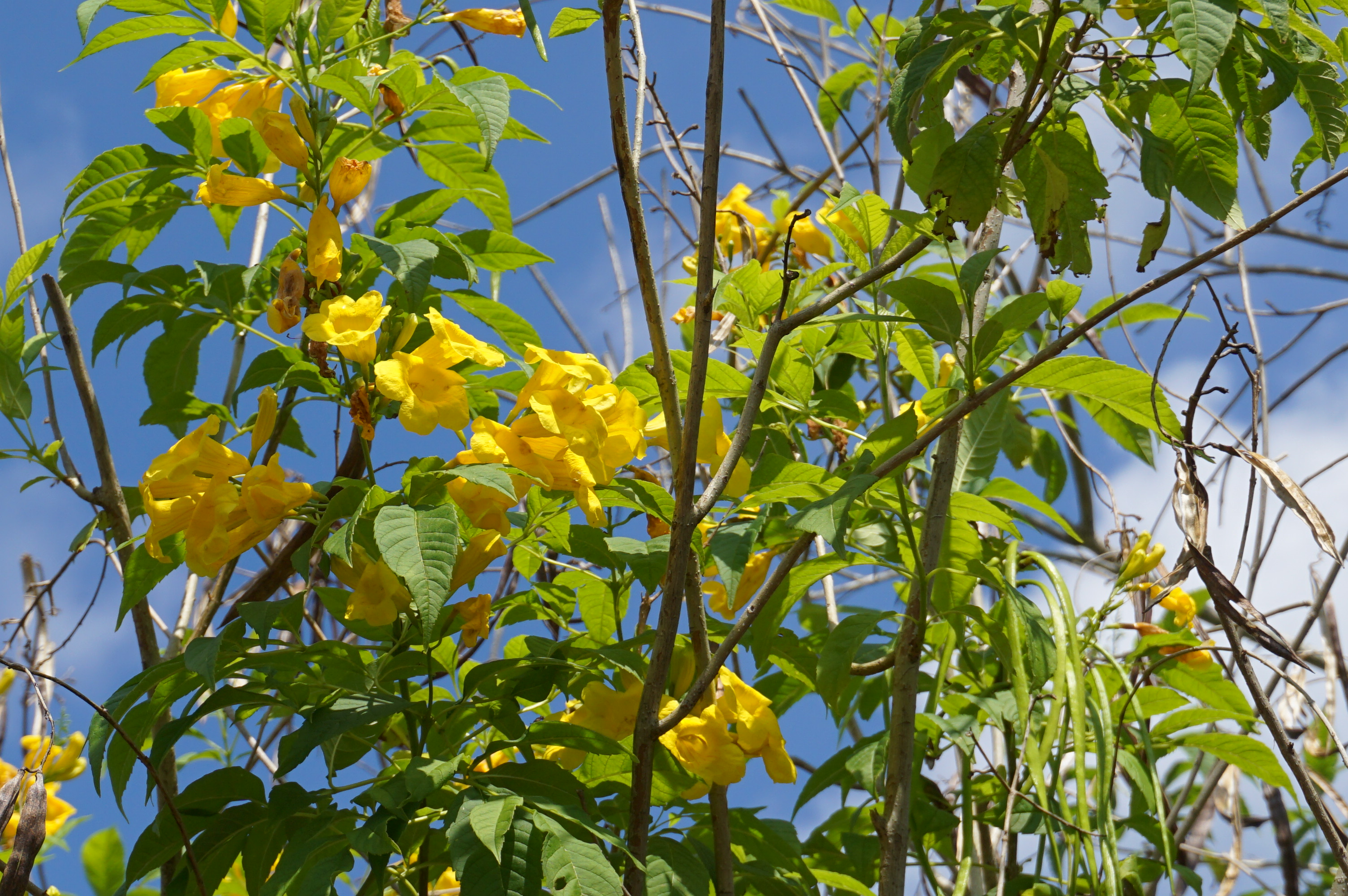
Large shrub

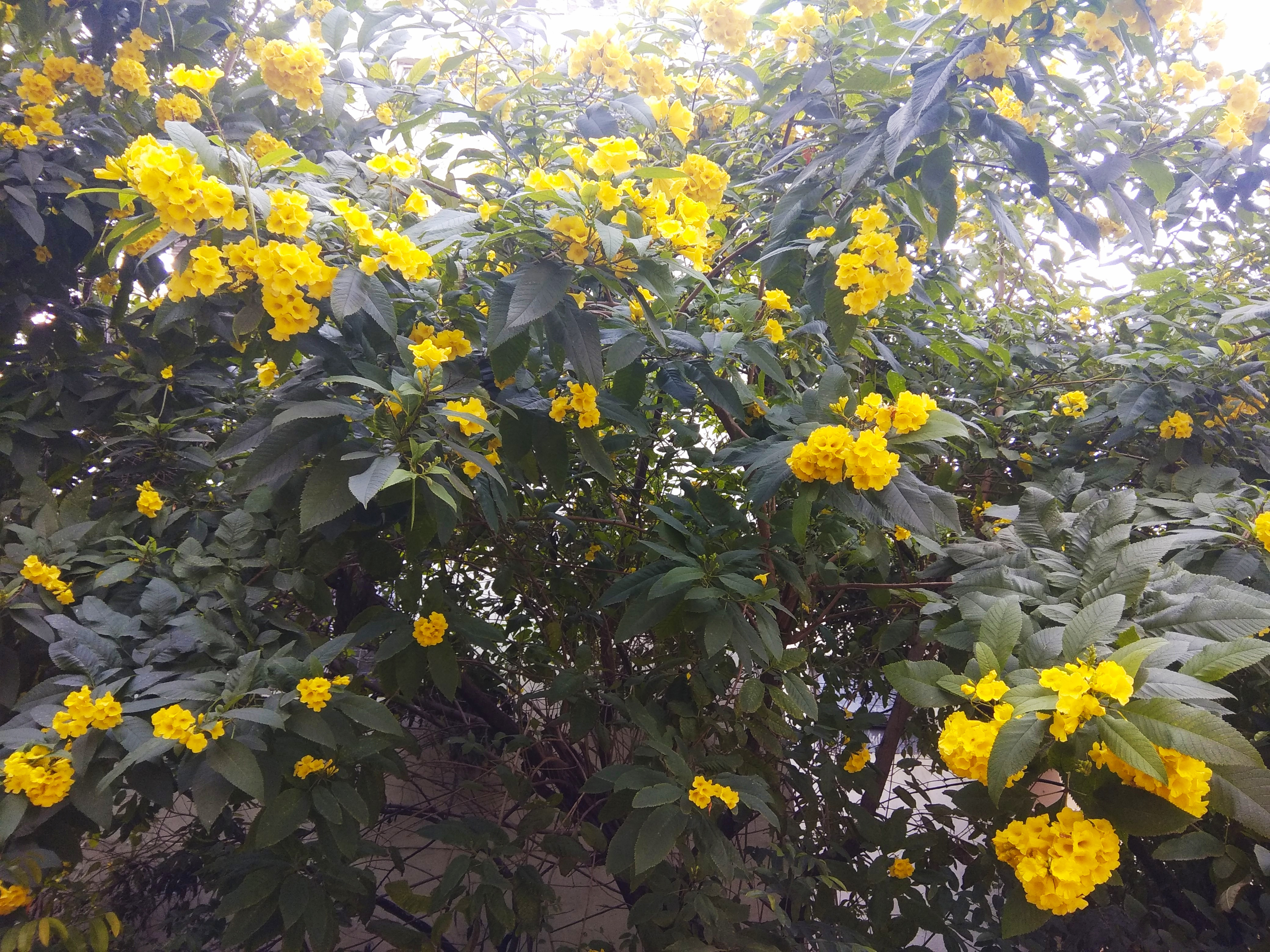
Large tree flowering

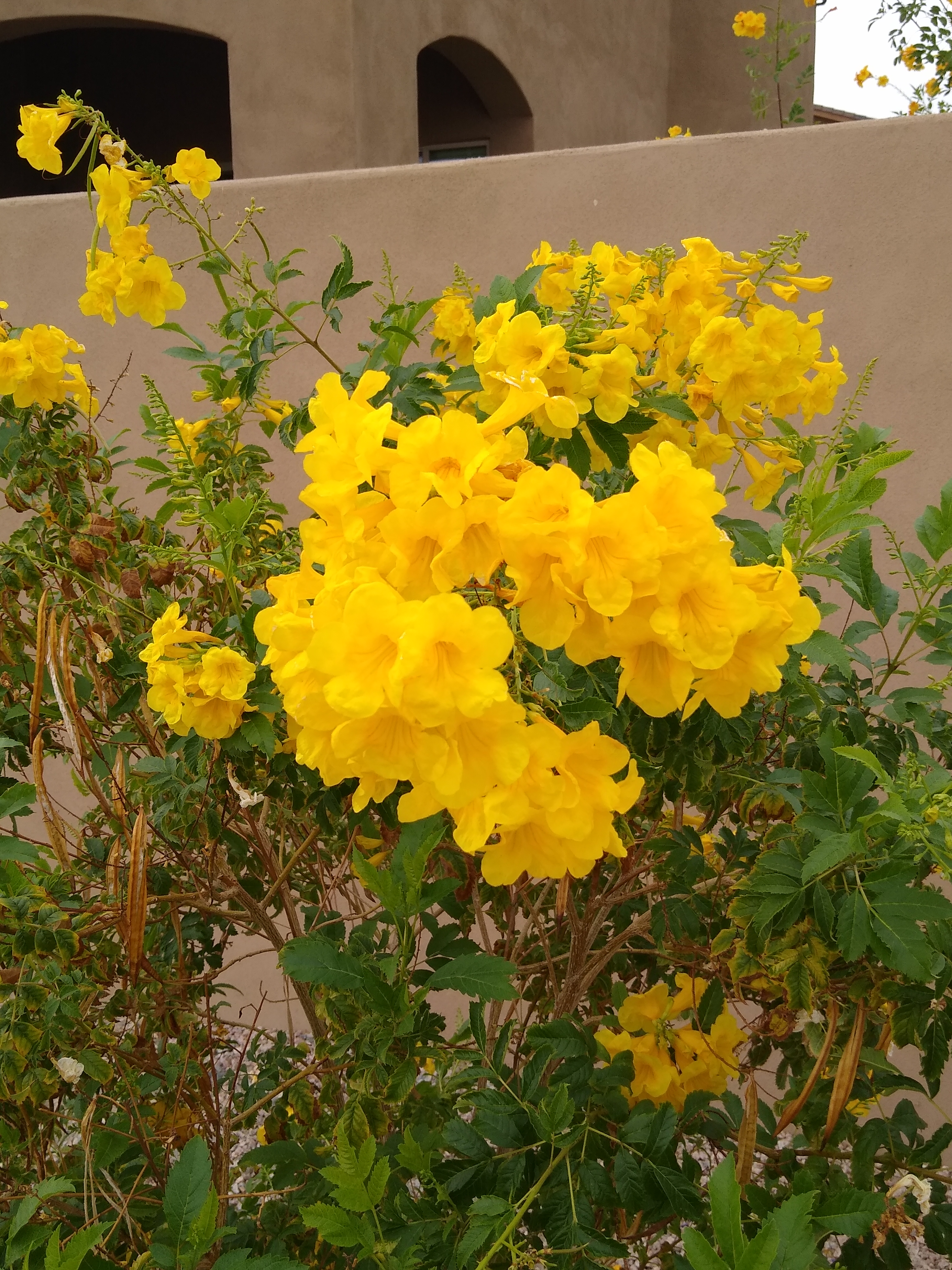
As a garden plant

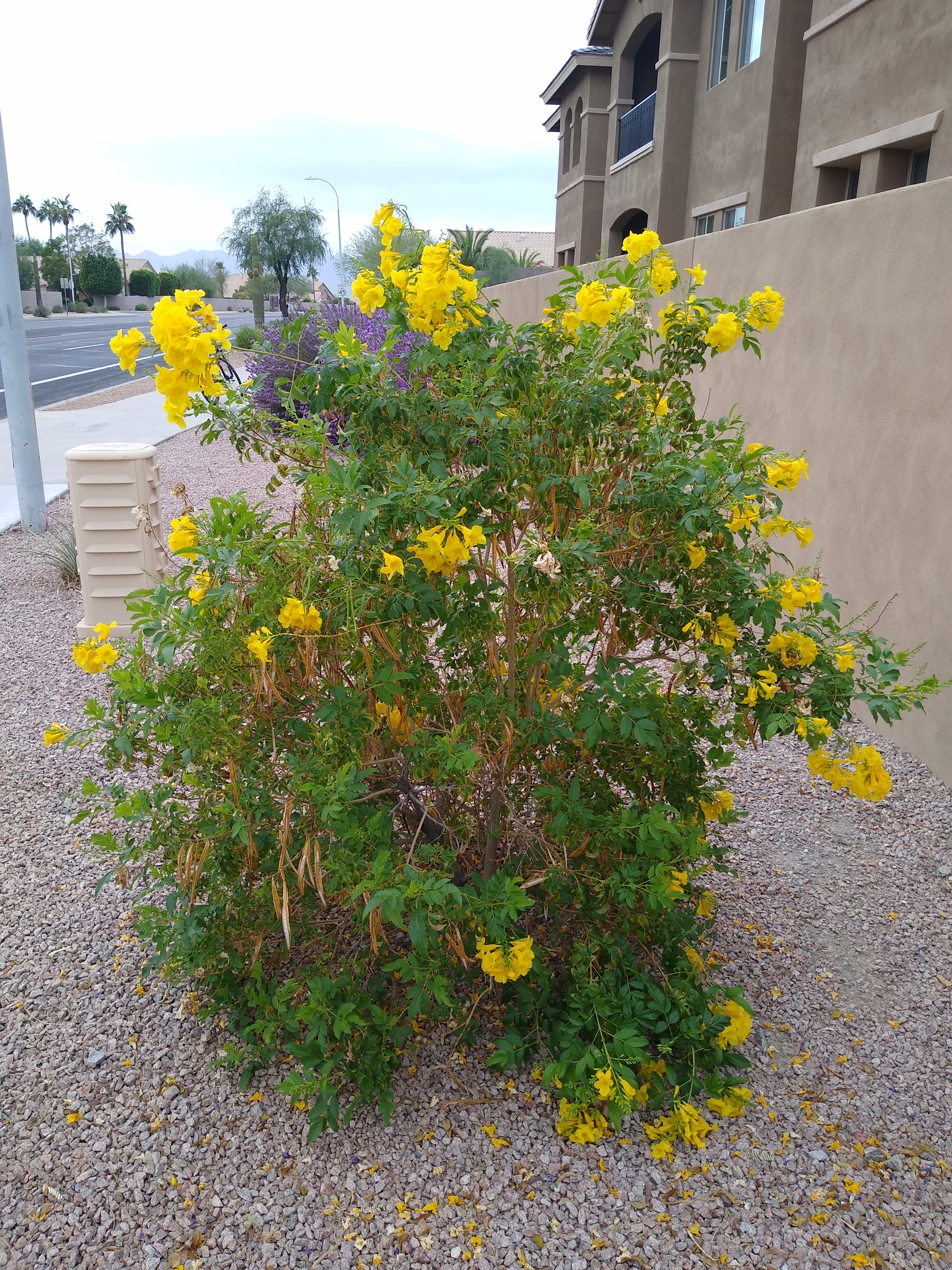
Front yard plant

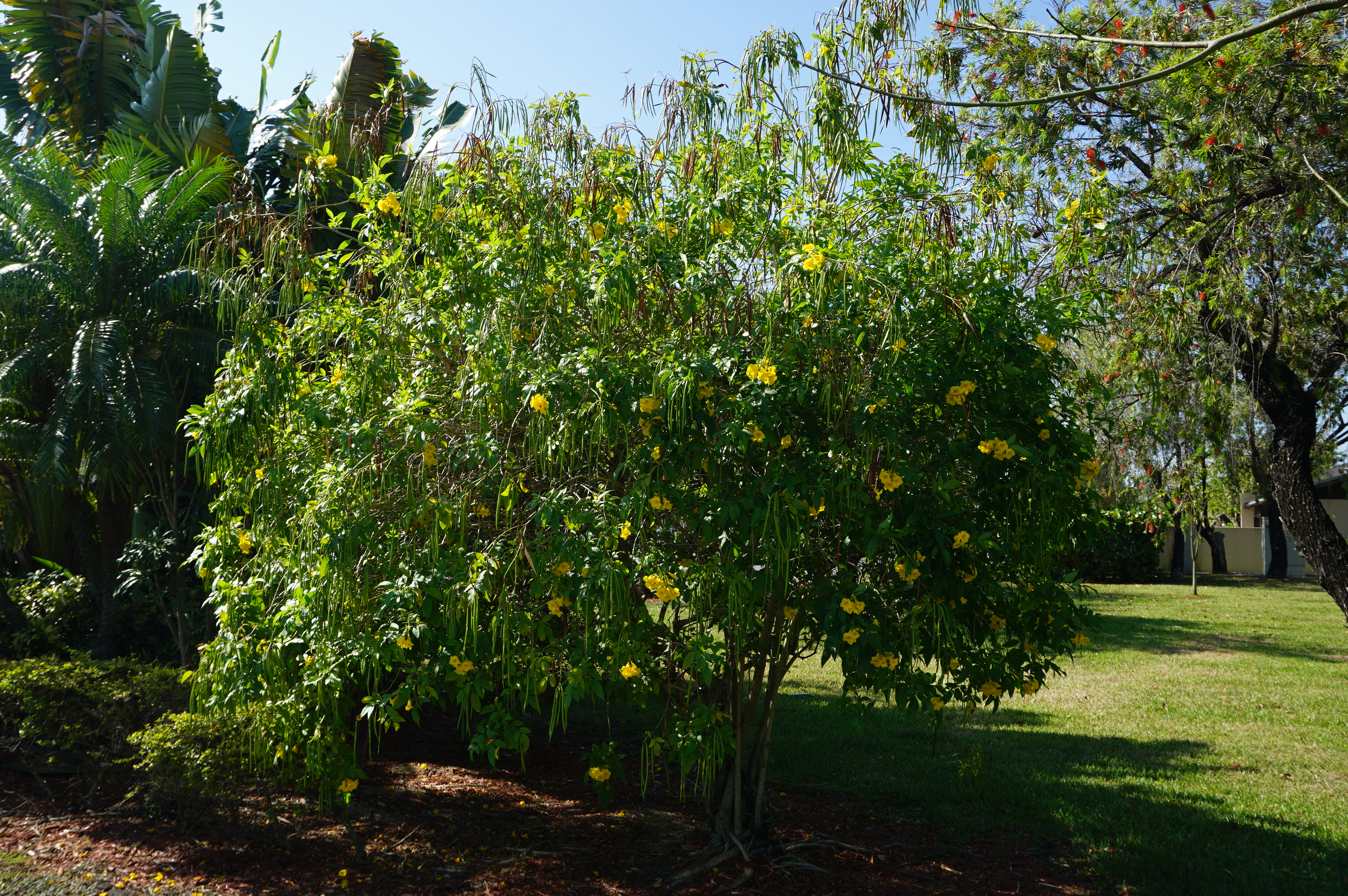
Tree with fruit

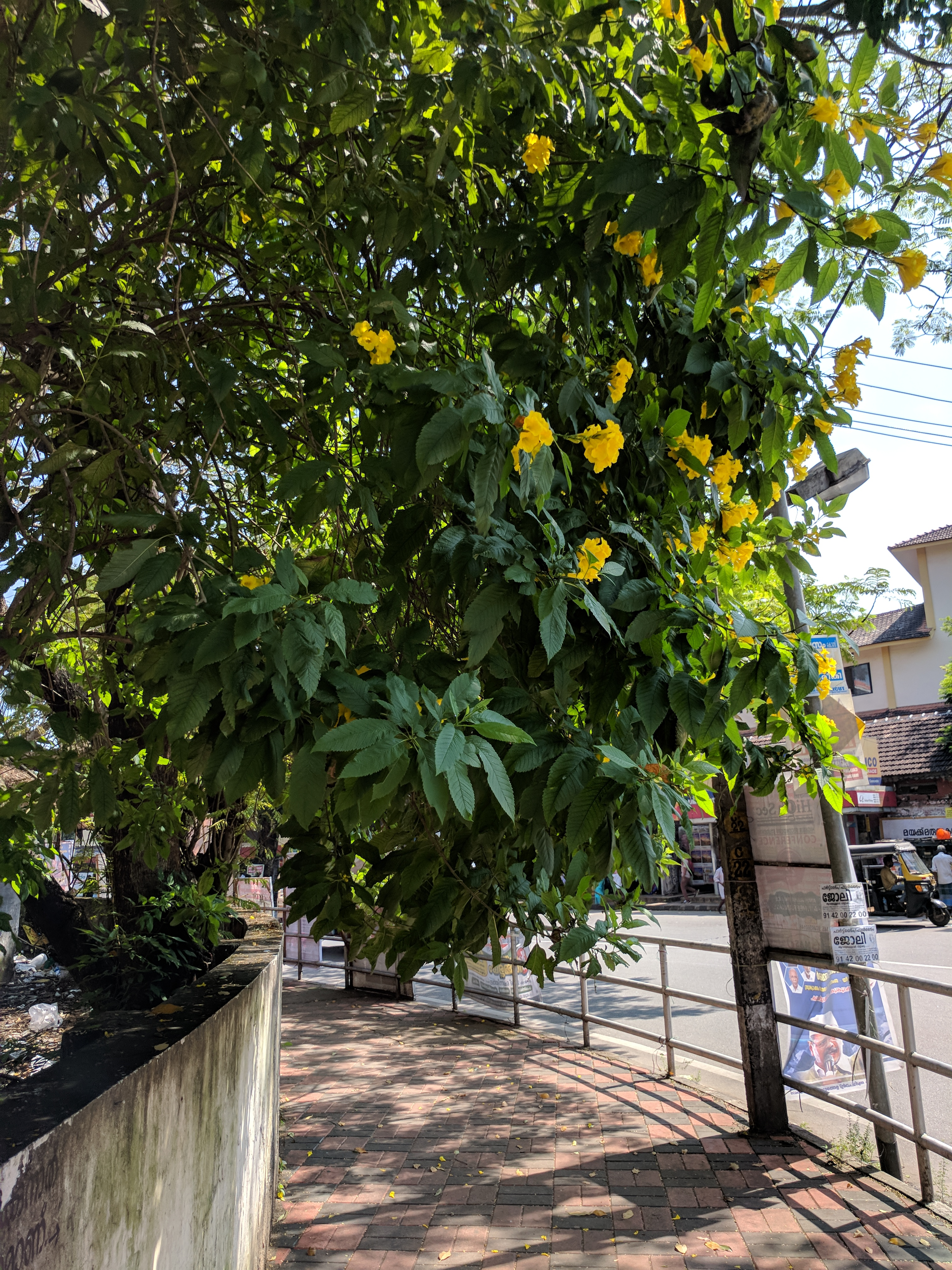
As a street tree

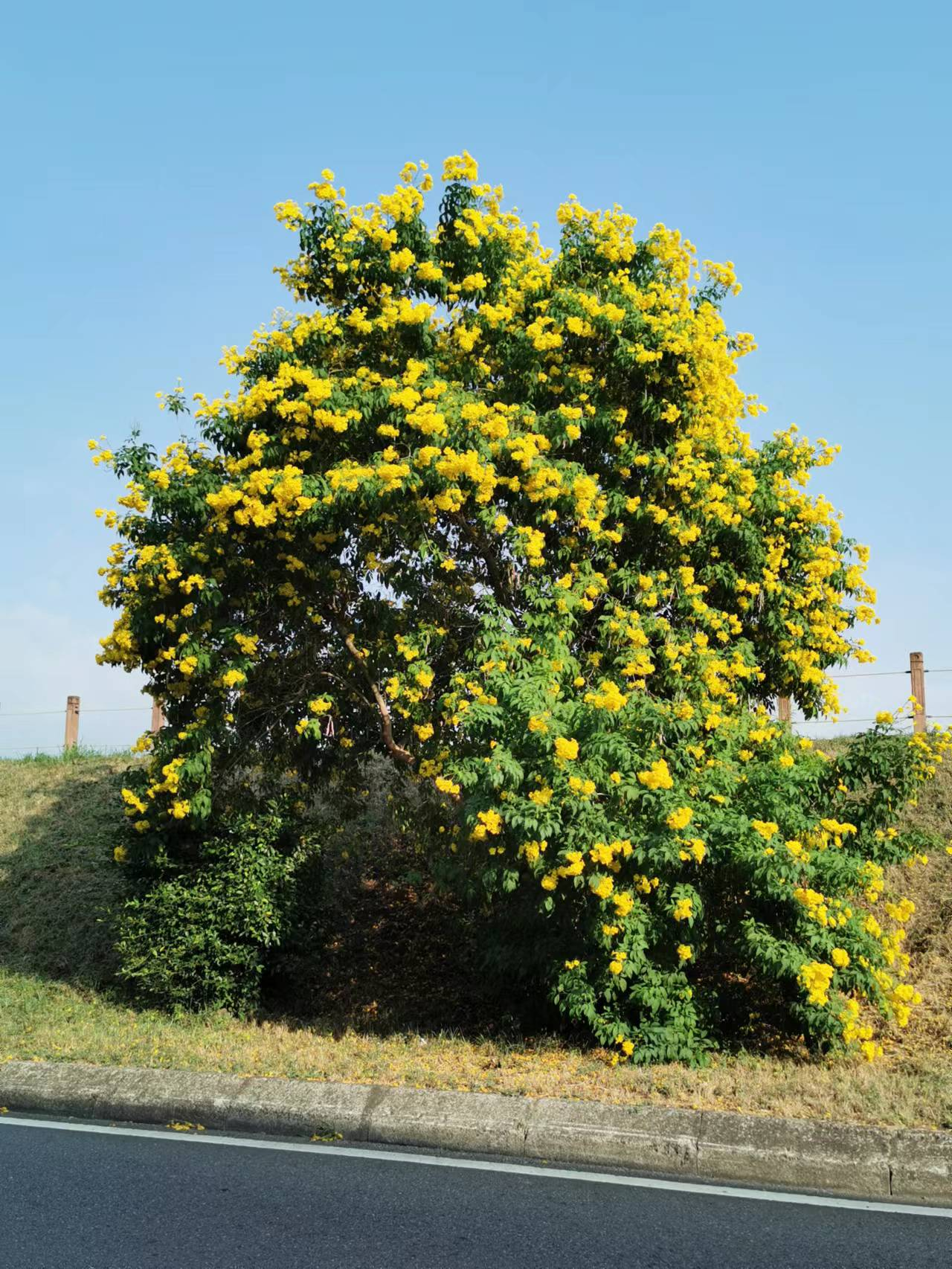
Plant by the road
