= William Watson (botanist) =

British botanist and horticulturist (1858–1925)

- Born: 14 March 1858; Garston, Liverpool
- Died: 30 January 1925 (aged 66); St Albans, Hertfordshire, UK
- Citizenship: United Kingdom
- Scientific career
- Fields: botany
- Institutions: Royal Botanical Gardens at Kew
- Author abbrev. (botany): W.Watson

William Watson (1858–1925) was a British botanist and horticulturist. He was a gardener at the Royal Botanic Gardens, Kew from 1879, Assistant Curator 1886–1901 and Curator 1901–1922. Watson was awarded the Veitch Memorial Medal in 1892 and elected as an Associate of the Linnean Society in 1904.

The species Hebenstretia watsonii was named in his honour.

== See also ==
- Category:Taxa named by William Watson (botanist)
