= Wonga =

Wonga may refer to:

== Events ==
- 2004 Equatorial Guinea coup d'état attempt, or the Wonga coup
- Wonga, a contest on The Big Breakfast television show

== Life forms ==
- Wonga pigeon (Leucosarcia melanoleuca), an Australian bird
- One of two climbing plants in Pandorea:
  - P. pandorana (wonga vine), endemic to Australia, Melanesia and Malesia
  - P. baileyana (large-leaved wonga), endemic to eastern Australia

== Places in Australia ==
=== Queensland ===
- Wonga, Queensland, a town
- Wonga Beach, Queensland, a locality

=== Victoria ===
- Wonga, a town in South Gippsland Shire
- Wonga Park, Victoria, a suburb of Melbourne
- Arthurs Seat, Victoria, a hill and locality (Woiwurrung: Wonga)

== Other uses ==
- Wonga, a British slang term for money
  - Wonga.com, a payday loan firm (2006–2020)
- Simon Wonga (1824–1874), Aboriginal elder

== See also ==
- Oonga (disambiguation)
- Wanga (disambiguation)
- Wongo (disambiguation)
- Wonka (disambiguation)
- Wunga (disambiguation)
