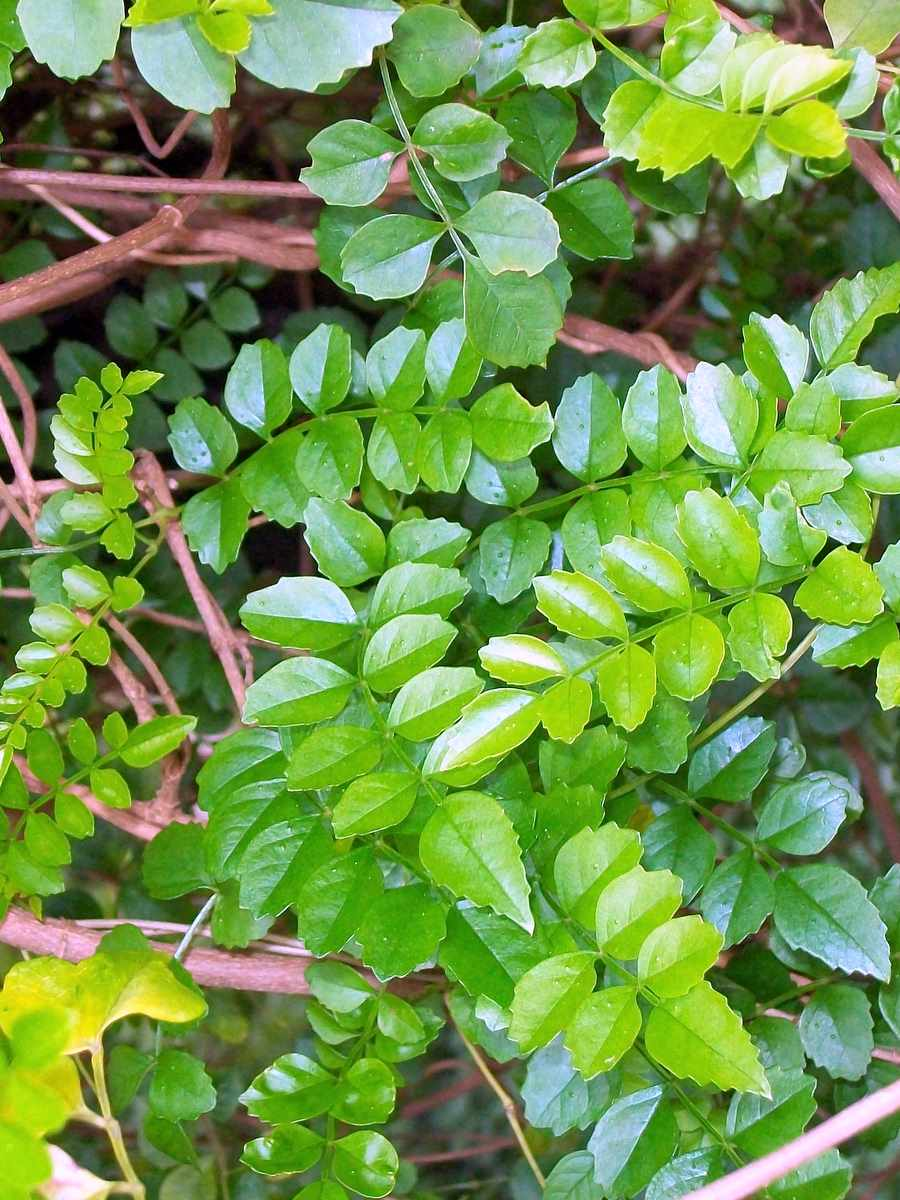

Scientific classification
- Kingdom: Plantae
- Clade: Tracheophytes
- Clade: Angiosperms
- Clade: Eudicots
- Clade: Asterids
- Order: Lamiales
- Family: Bignoniaceae
- Genus: Pandorea
- Species: P. pandorana
- Subspecies: P. p. subsp. austrocaledonica

Trinomial name
- Pandorea pandorana subsp. austrocaledonica (Bureau) P.S.Green

Synonyms
- Tecoma austrocaledonica Bureau; Bignonia pandorana Andrews

= Pandorea pandorana subsp. austrocaledonica =

Boat vine

Subspecies of vine

Pandorea pandorana subsp. austrocaledonica is a woody climbing vine in the family Bignoniaceae. Commonly known as the boat vine, this plant is native to the regions of Lord Howe Island, Vanuatu and New Caledonia. A common plant, it is found at altitudes ranging from sea level to over 500 metres above sea level.

The compound leaves have 7 to 9 leaflets when mature. Leaflets are oval to lanceolate with scalloped or toothed edges. 2 to 3 cm long, 1.5 to 2 cm wide. Leaflets are practically stalkless, though the terminal leaflet has a noticeable leaf stem. White, vanilla scented flowers form from August to November. The fruit capsule is 4 to 5 cm long, in an oblong/elliptic shape. Inside are many flat, winged seeds.

This plant was cultivated as early as 1800 in England. Early reports state the seeds originally came from Norfolk Island. However, it is now considered that this plant is not indigenous to that island, and the seeds came from cultivated plants in Norfolk Island or Sydney.
