= Spearwood =

Spearwood may refer to:

- Spearwood, Western Australia, a suburb
- Spearwood, common name of several plant species:
  - Acacia doratoxylon
  - Eucalyptus doratoxylon
  - Kunzea ericifolia
  - Kunzea glabrescens
  - Pandorea doratoxylon
