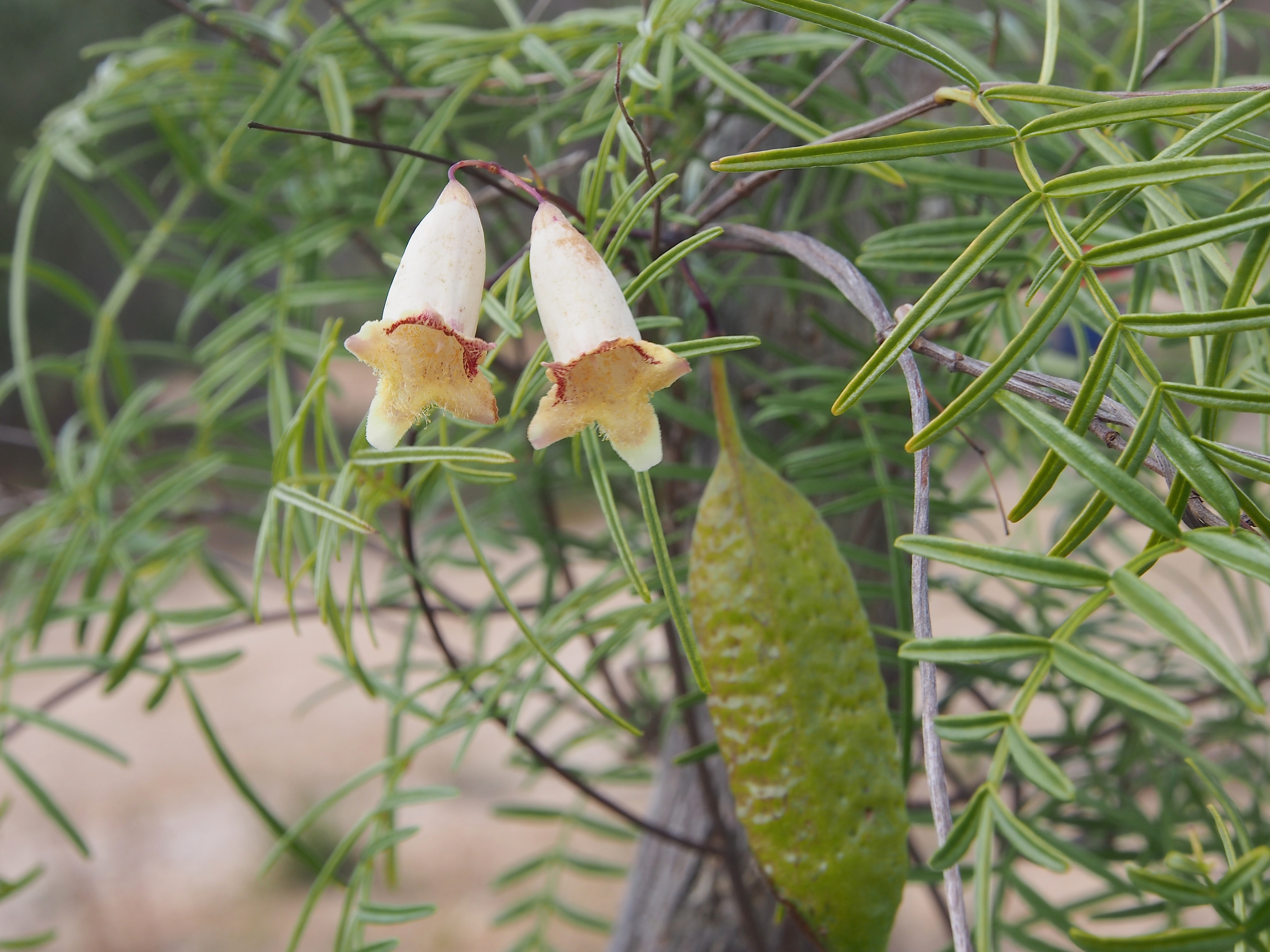

Scientific classification
- Kingdom: Plantae
- Clade: Tracheophytes
- Clade: Angiosperms
- Clade: Eudicots
- Clade: Asterids
- Order: Lamiales
- Family: Bignoniaceae
- Genus: Pandorea
- Species: P. linearis

Binomial name
- Pandorea linearis (F.M.Bailey) Guymer

Synonyms
- Pandorea australis subsp. linearis (F.M.Bailey) Steenis; Tecoma australis var. linearis F.M.Bailey

= Pandorea linearis =

Species of vine

Pandorea linearis is a species of flowering plant in the family Bignoniaceae and is endemic to Queensland. It is similar to Pandorea pandorana but has nine to thirteen linear leaflets, the lateral leaflets 11–42 mm (0.43–1.65 in) long and 1.5–6 mm (0.059–0.236 in) wide.

This species was first formally described in 1901 by Frederick Manson Bailey who gave it the name Tecoma australis var. linearis in The Queensland Flora from specimens collected near Herberton by his son, John Frederick Bailey. In 2008, Gordon P. Guymer raised the variety to species status as Pandorea linearis in the journal Austrobaileya.

Pandorea linearis grows in woodland, forest and shrubland from the Stannary Hills to the Paluma Range in north-eastern Queensland.
