= Cairnsfoot =

School in New South Wales, Australia

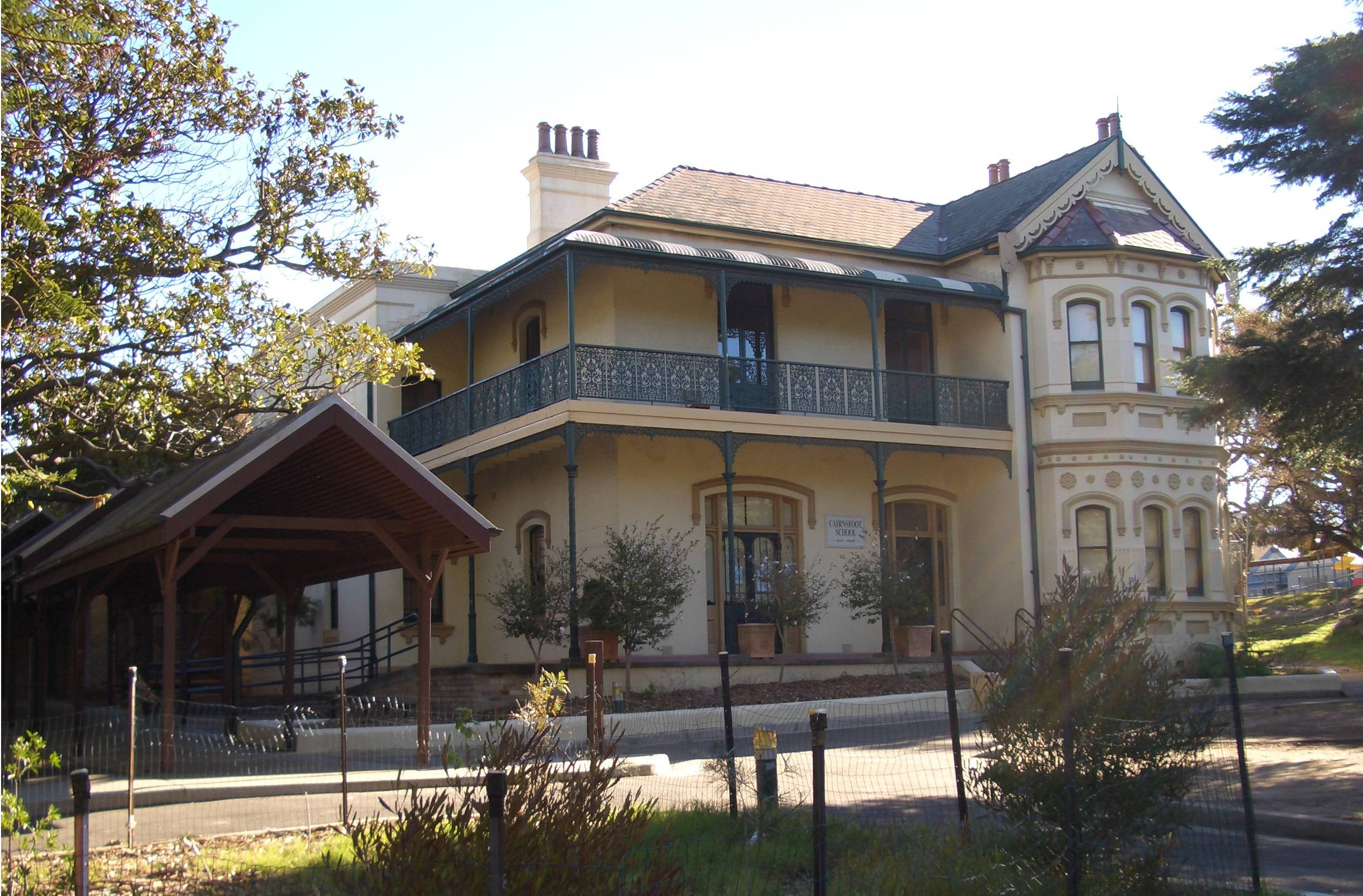
- Cairnsfoot School, 2006

- Location within Sydney

General information
- Type: House; Repurposed as a school; Currently vacant
- Architectural style: Victorian Italianate
- Location: 18 Loftus Street, Turrella, Bayside Council, New South Wales, Australia
- Coordinates: 33°55′55″S 151°08′39″E
- Construction started: 1880
- Completed: 1884; 142 years ago
- Renovated: 1963
- Owner: NSW Department of Education

Renovating team
- Architect: Olga Kosterin

New South Wales Heritage Register
- Official name: Cairnsfoot Special School; Loftus Street Special School; Loftus Street Public School
- Type: State heritage (complex / group)
- Designated: 2 April 1999
- Reference no.: 551
- Type: School - State (public)
- Category: Education
- Builders: Edward M. Farleigh

Cairnsfoot is a heritage-listed former residential villa and special school at 18 Loftus Street, Turrella, New South Wales, a suburb of Sydney Australia. It was built from 1880 to 1884 by Edward M. Farleigh. It has also been known as Cairnsfoot Special School, Loftus Street Special School and Loftus Street Public School. It was added to the New South Wales State Heritage Register on 2 April 1999.

== History ==
The name "Turrella" is an Aboriginal word meaning "a reedy place" or "water weeds". Wolli Creek, which runs through the original site of settlement, was first known as Woolly Creek, and it is quite likely that the weeds in the water gave it a thick appearance.

The land on which Cairnsfoot was later built was first granted to Ruben Hannam on 31 August 1833.

=== Ownership by the Farleigh family ===
Edward Manicome Farleigh was born in County Mayo, Ireland, in 1838, the son of a coast guard officer. In 1865, with his wife and two small sons, he migrated to the colony of Victoria. In 1873, they moved to Sydney, where Farleigh established the leather merchants' firm of E.M. Farleigh Pty. Ltd. at Mascot, which was later called Farleigh, Nettheim and Company. E. M. Farleigh had started work as a tannery worker and from there set up his own business.

Early in 1884, Farleigh purchased five acres (two hectares) of uneven ground in Loftus Street at the corner of Willington Street and erected a fine two storey Italianate mansion with extensive outbuildings which was called Cairnsfoot. Mrs. Farleigh is said to have been delighted with every feature of the house except the main staircase, which she considered mean and unnecessarily steep for a house of its size. By 1885, the family had increased to ten children the eldest of whom, John Gibson Farleigh, was to become a leading industrialist and a member of the New South Wales Legislative Council.

Cairnsfoot was set with outbuildings in a garden setting of mature trees. The grounds included four trees which survive today and are thought to date from 1884: two Norfolk Island pines (Araucaria heterophylla) and two evergreen magnolias/bull bays (Magnolia grandiflora) from America.

Cairnsfoot shows the development of large villas on the urban fringe of Rockdale.

A c. 1905 photograph shows that the architectural layout of the garden did not change during the seventy years the Farleigh family lived at Cairnsfoot. It shows garden beds planted with annuals. Mass planting of bedding plants delighted the Victorians.

After Edward Manicom Farleigh died in 1909 the western half of the estate was sold and a new street, appropriately called Edward Street, came into being. There is no record of this part of the original estate. It may have included paddocks for horses and a house cow, a poultry run, a garden supplying vegetables and flowers to the house and perhaps a glasshouse. There were (other) dairies, poultry farms and Chinese market gardens in the Arncliffe district at this time.

Two unmarried sisters, Elizabeth and May, were the last of Edward Manicom Farleigh's family to live at Cairnsfoot.

==== Grounds and gardens ====
Cairnsfoot's grounds are shown in a series of photographs taken between 1943 and 1947 by neighbour Alan Evans. These photographs show a large and sophisticated garden with pollarded camphor laurels (Cinnamomum camphora) running along the entire length of its Loftus Street boundary, high timber picket fence and paling fences on Loftus Street, double gates for carriages and cars and a single gate for pedestrians. A large white camellia (Camellia japonica cv.) was beside the pedestrian gate. Also growing along that boundary were giant Danubian (or Spanish) reed clumps (Arundo donax and oleanders (Nerium oleander cv.s).

Inside the main gates these photographs show the house dominating the view, facing east and south. The northern wall was windowless. All windows had wooden Venetian blinds. The carriage drive continued westward to the stables / coach house. The drive and carriage circle were separated by a teardrop shaped bed bordered by stones and planted with candlestick aloes (Aloe arborescens), yellow lantana (Lantana camara cv.) and the dramatic succulent, Agave attenuata. Along the southern verandah of the house were hydrangeas (Hydrangea macrophylla), an autumn camellia (Camellia sasanqua) pruned into an umbrella form, a Lord Howe Island palm (Kentia fosteriana) and a variegated Japanese laurel (Euonymus japonicus "Aureo-Variegatus" pruned into a globe.

To the south of the drive was an orchard and vegetable garden. A wooden railing marked the boundary of the ornamental garden. Fruit trees included China pears and peaches. A house cow, Biddy, grazed in the orchard. Also along the southern edge of the drive are two fine specimen trees - two large Norfolk Island pines (Araucaria heterophylla) and two evergreen magnolias/Bull Bay trees (Magnolia grandiflora).

To the north of the carriage loop was a border of wormwood, oleanders and roses edging a lawn area. Garden beds around it contained roses, conifers and occasional plantings of gladioli, zinnias, wallflowers, lupins, pansies etc. A freestanding arbor/pergola to the north-east of the house was covered in climbing roses. Along the northern house wall was a large frangipani (Plumeria rubra cv.). A border on the north side of the lawn was planted with clipped azaleas (Rhododendron indicum cv.s), a yucca (Yucca sp.) and succulents including Echeveria sp. / cv.s such as E.x "Imbricata". A high wire mesh fence (3–4-metre-tall (10–13 ft) from the photographs) ran along the back (northern side) of this shrubbery. A Port Jackson fig (Ficus rubiginosa) and other trees shaded this border. Further north again was the most spectacular planting in the garden - a large grove of century plant (Agave americana) in the north-eastern corner. Perched on a rocky plinth its sculptural form and fleshy striped yellow leaves made it a feature. In the rocky northern end of the garden was a pergola covered in bower-of-beauty vine (Bignonia sp., now called Pandorea jasminoides) leading to a wilder area of the garden. Also here was a fernery, a ubiquitous feature of Victorian gardens with a collection of ferns, palms, orchids and begonias inside. Behind that were the stables with a hayloft above. A small cockscomb coral tree (Erythrina crista-galli), more succulents, a wooden railing marking the boundary to the north of the ornamental garden were other features of this part of the site.

=== Ownership by the NSW Department of Education ===
The property remained the family home of the Farleighs until it was bought by the NSW Department of Education in 1959.

Prior to the building being opened as the Loftus Street Special School the original cast iron was removed and the upstairs verandahs were enclosed. In more recent times the whole complex has been upgraded and sympathetically refurbished by the NSW Public Works Department. This has included the replacement of the cast iron work and restoration of its original name, Cairnsfoot. The house then served as the administrative block of the school with new buildings which have been added to cater for 99 handicapped children, aged from four to 18 years.

The Loftus Street Public School, when it incorporated with South Haven School reverted to using the original property name of Cairnsfoot (for the School). When the new section of Cairnsfoot School was designed by Sydney architect Olga Kosterin, it had as its focal point the assembly hall, which serves also as a classroom for art, music and physical education. The Library had books selected for the needs of the children. The home economics block where children were taught skills aimed at making them as independent as possible, was also important. In the laundry children washed and ironed - processing their own clothes on particular days. There was also a bathroom and a fully furnished bedroom. In the solar heated pool, swimming lessons and water therapy were year-round activities and children benefited from special exercise programs.

Rockdale Municipal Council listed the building in 1985 and it is recorded by the National Trust of Australia (NSW).

In January 2017, Cairnsfoot School vacated the building and undertook a $21.9 million move to new premises in Brighton-le-Sands. The ageing facilities, the inability to adapt them due to the heritage-listed house, and the school site not being flat were cited among reasons for the move. In 2018, the NSW Government proposed to rezone the site as residential for high-rise apartments; however, this proposal was scrapped in March 2018 after community opposition. The Minister for Education Rob Stokes announced that the site would be "needed for future educational purposes".

== Description ==
Cairnsfoot is a two-storey rendered brick Victorian Italianate villa with gabled roof covered in slate tiles with verandah and balcony at front, with cast iron balustrades, posts, brackets and valences. A shallow bay window dominates the front with two rendered brick chimneys. An original timber back verandah with a skillion roof sits at the rear. An original gabled roof rendered brick outbuildings also sits on the site. Until the late 20th century the house had always been painted shades of pale grey, with darker grey marking out window details etc., and some cream details.

The slate roof is hipped and a front gable contains a two-storey bay with segmental arched windows. The two storey verandah has been enclosed on the upper level. (RNE,1978). It features French windows onto ground floor verandah which also has thin columns. Four chimney pots on chimney.

It was reported to be in excellent condition as at 4 May 2009, with original outbuildings, slate roof, chimneys, cast-iron balustrades, posts, brackets, valences, timber back verandah, doors and windows. It also retains its original garden setting. The interior has been substantially altered to accommodate a school.

The four trees dating from 1884: two Norfolk Island pines (Araucaria heterophylla) and two evergreen magnolias/ bull bays (Magnolia grandiflora) are suffering due to too much paving close to their roots, reducing air and water supply. The pines have started to drop limbs.

The site is zoned "Special Uses - School".

=== Modifications and dates ===
- 1909: The western half of the estate was sold and a new street, appropriately called Edward Street, came into being
- 1942: Construction of a very sturdy domestic air raid shelter (on a then-private, adjacent garden "Alwyn" (16 Loftus Street. This garden was well-documented in photographs taken by local amateur photographer, Alan Evans). It is likely that this shelter has been buried and covered over and is now part of Cairnsfoot Special School. The school secretary remembers it being used as a wine cellar in the 1970s prior to the demolition of the accompanying bungalow. (Note: Matthew Stephens, HHT, pers.comm, 26/6/09 - copies of the photographs are held in MHNSW's (formerly HHT) Caroline Simpson Library & Research Collection.)
- 1955-9 Prior to the building being opened as the Loftus Street Special School the original cast iron was removed and the upstairs verandahs were enclosed. In more recent times the whole complex has been upgraded and sympathetically refurbished by the Public Works Department. This has included the replacement of the cast-iron work and restoration of its original name, Cairnsfoot. The house is now the administrative block of the school with new buildings which have been added to cater for 99 handicapped children, aged from four to 18 years.
- c. 1963 the new section of Cairnsfoot School was designed by Sydney architect Olga Kosterin, with as its focal point:
  - an assembly hall, which serves also as a classroom for art, music and physical education;
  - a Library;
  - a home economics block;
  - a laundry;
  - a bathroom;
  - a fully furnished bedroom;
  - a solar heated pool

== Heritage listing ==
This villa is significant as a rare example of a substantial Victorian Italianate villa, which retains its original outbuildings and garden setting of mature trees and which shows the development of large villas on the urban fringe of Rockdale. Substantial grounds with many large trees.

Cairnsfoot Special School was listed on the New South Wales State Heritage Register on 2 April 1999.
