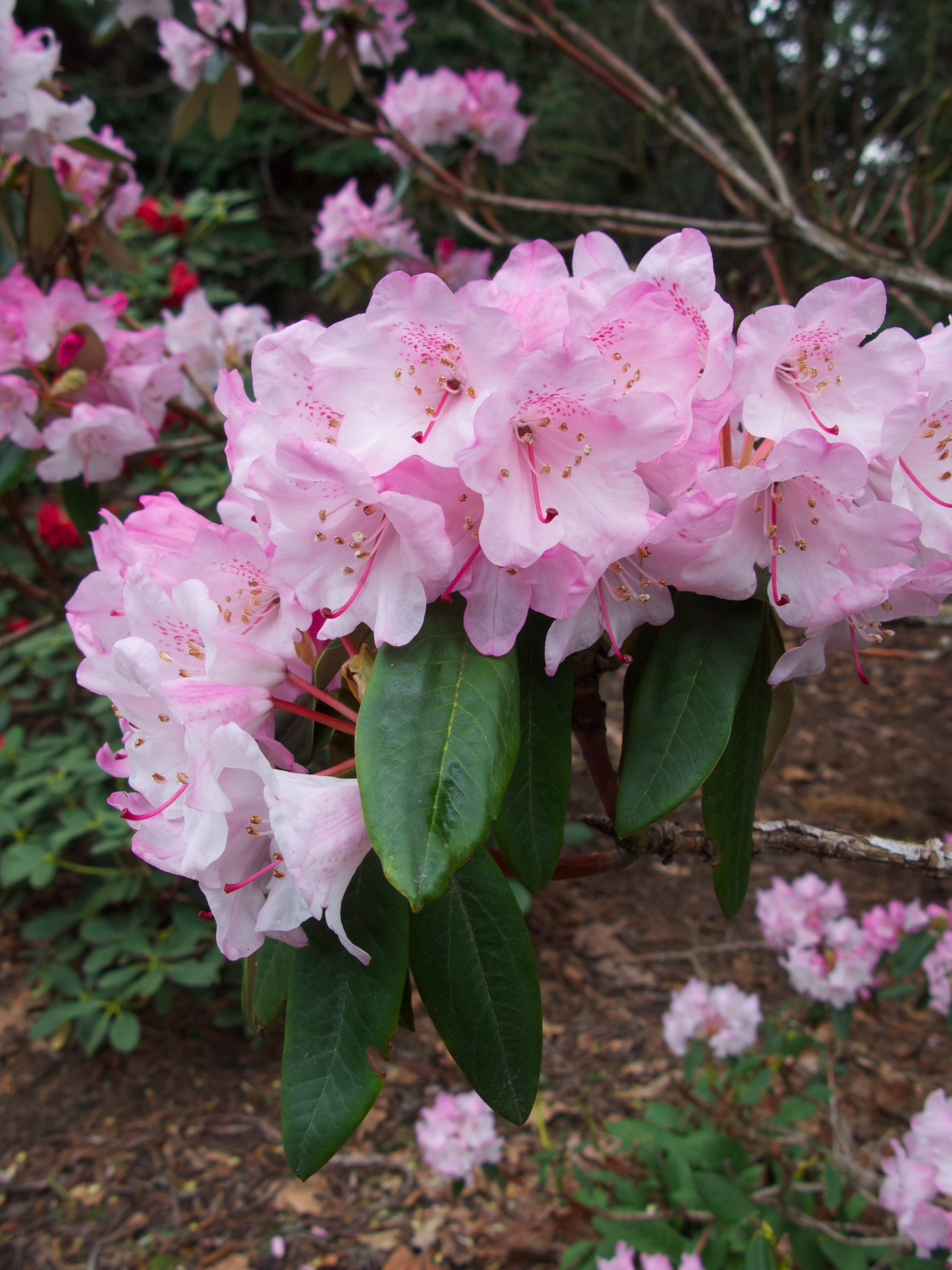
- In cultivation at Royal Botanic Garden Edinburgh Acc. No. 19980772A

Scientific classification
- Kingdom: Plantae
- Clade: Tracheophytes
- Clade: Angiosperms
- Clade: Eudicots
- Clade: Asterids
- Order: Ericales
- Family: Ericaceae
- Genus: Rhododendron
- Species: R. principis

Binomial name
- Rhododendron principis Bureau & Franch.

= Rhododendron principis =

Species of plant

Rhododendron principis is an evergreen shrub growing 2–6 m (6.6–19.7 ft) tall, with leathery leaves and pink flowers. This species grows in open forest at 2,900–3,950 m (9,510–12,960 ft) altitude in Tibet, China.
