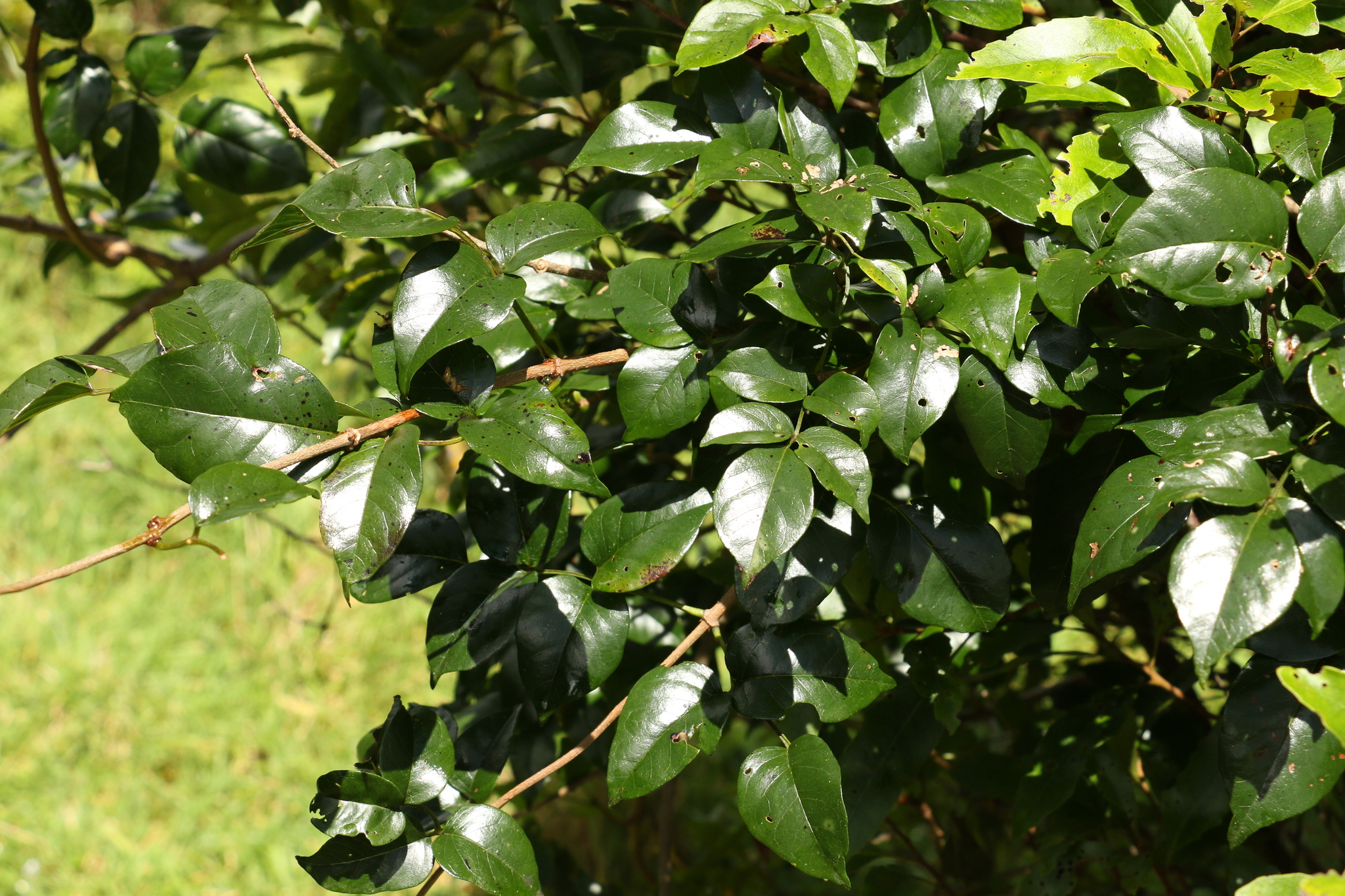

Scientific classification
- Kingdom: Plantae
- Clade: Tracheophytes
- Clade: Angiosperms
- Clade: Eudicots
- Clade: Asterids
- Order: Lamiales
- Family: Bignoniaceae
- Genus: Pandorea
- Species: P. floribunda

Binomial name
- Pandorea floribunda (A.Cunn. ex DC.) Guymer

Synonyms
- Tecoma floribunda DC.

= Pandorea floribunda =

Species of vine

Pandorea floribunda is a species of flowering plant in the family Bignoniaceae and is endemic to eastern Australia. It is similar to Pandorea pandorana but the leaflets are egg-shaped, 30–80 mm (1.2–3.1 in) long and 15–50 mm (0.59–1.97 in) wide and the flowers are pale yellow to cream-coloured.

This species was first formally described in 1845 by Augustin Pyramus de Candolle who gave it the name Tecoma floribunda in his treatise, Prodromus Systematis Naturalis Regni Vegetabilis from an unpublished description by Allan Cunningham. In 2008, Gordon P. Guymer changed the name to Pandorea floribunda in the journal Austrobaileya.

Pandorea floribunda grows in forest, woodland and rainforest from sea level to an altitude of 1,200 m (3,900 ft) on the coast and ranges from Gladstone in Queensland to Lismore in New South Wales.
