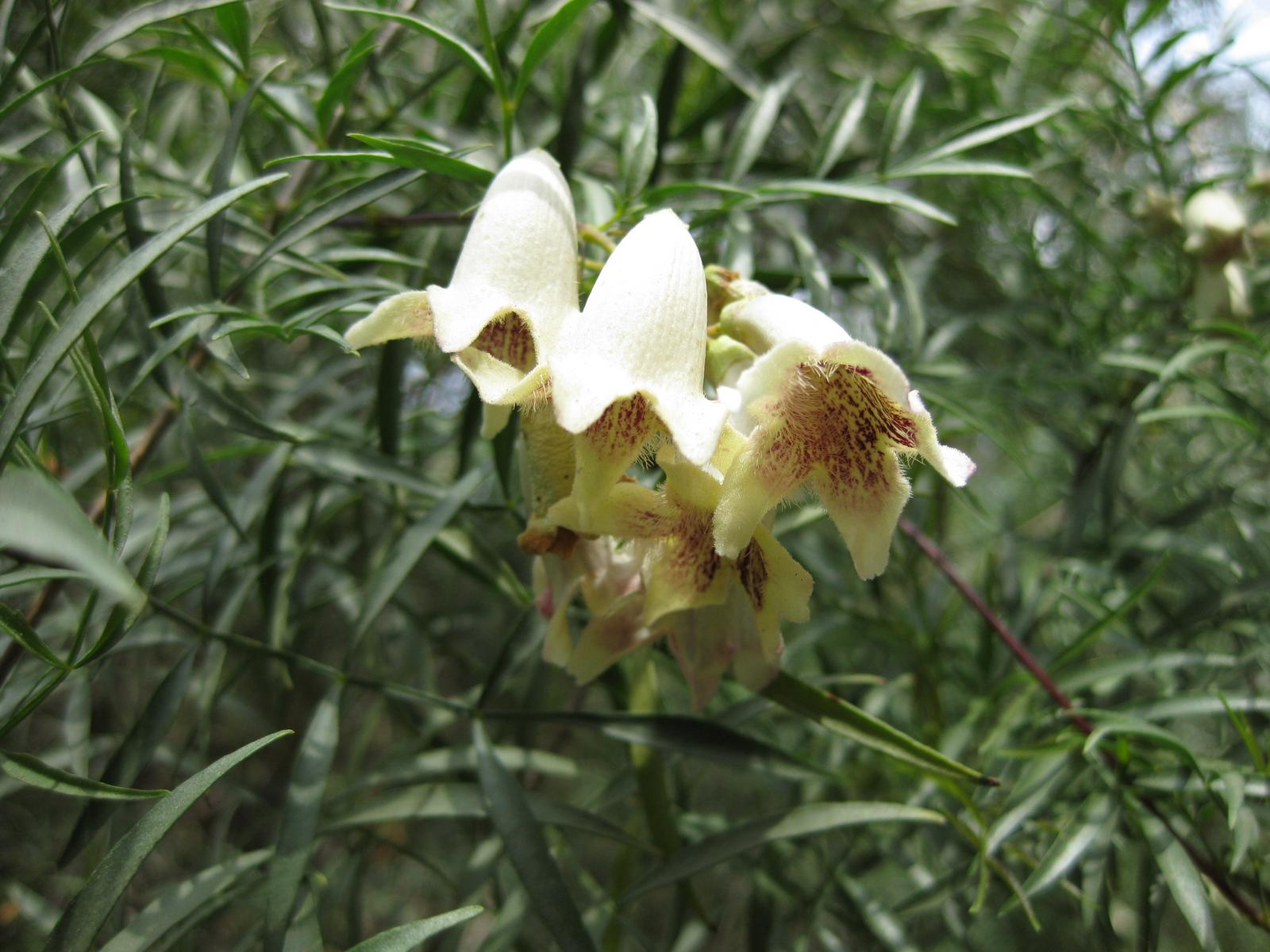

Scientific classification
- Kingdom: Plantae
- Clade: Tracheophytes
- Clade: Angiosperms
- Clade: Eudicots
- Clade: Asterids
- Order: Lamiales
- Family: Bignoniaceae
- Genus: Pandorea
- Species: P. doratoxylon

Binomial name
- Pandorea doratoxylon (J.M.Black) J.M.Black

Synonyms
- Tecoma doratoxylon J.M.Black

= Pandorea doratoxylon =

Species of vine

Pandorea doratoxylon is a species of woody vine in the family Bignoniaceae and is endemic to Australia. The species was first formally described in 1927 by John McConnell Black who gave it the name Tecoma doratoxylon in Transactions and Proceedings of the Royal Society of South Australia. In 1937, Black changed the name to Pandorea doratoxylon.

Plants of the World Online gives the distribution of this species as "New South Wales, Queensland" and the Australian Plant Census as "WA, NT, Qld, NSW" but the name is "not current" in Western Australia and is listed as a synonym of Pandorea pandorana (Andrews) Steenis subsp. pandorana in New South Wales.

Pandorea doratoxylon is an accepted species in the Northern Territory.
