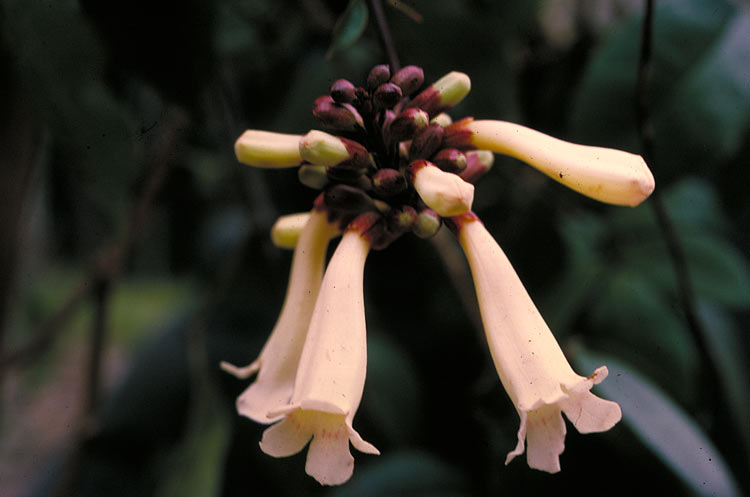

Scientific classification
- Kingdom: Plantae
- Clade: Tracheophytes
- Clade: Angiosperms
- Clade: Eudicots
- Clade: Asterids
- Order: Lamiales
- Family: Bignoniaceae
- Genus: Pandorea
- Species: P. nervosa

Binomial name
- Pandorea nervosa (Andrews) Steenis

= Pandorea nervosa =

Species of vine

Pandorea nervosa is a species of flowering plant in the family Bignoniaceae and is endemic to Queensland. It is a woody vine that grows in rainforest and has pinnate leaves with three or five leaflets, and white, tube-shaped flowers.

== Description ==
Pandorea nervosa is a woody vine with a stem diameter up to 30 mm (1.2 in). The leaves are pinnate with three or five leaflets about 45–100 mm (1.8–3.9 in) long and 10–50 mm (0.39–1.97 in) wide, the leaves on a petiole 15–35 mm (0.59–1.38 in) long, the end leaflet sessile or on a petiolule up to 8 mm (0.31 in) long. The flowers are borne near the ends of the stems in dense clusters on a peduncle about 20 mm (0.79 in) long, each flower on a pedicel 3–6 mm (0.12–0.24 in) long. The five sepals are 6–7.5 mm (0.24–0.30 in) long and fused at the base forming a bell-shaped tube with lobes about 2.5 mm (0.098 in) long. The five petals are white and fused at the base forming a tube about 35 mm (1.4 in) long and 15–20 mm (0.59–0.79 in) in diameter with lobes about 8 mm (0.31 in) long. The fruit is a capsule about 125 mm (4.9 in) long containing winged seeds.

== Taxonomy ==
Pandorea nervosa was first formally described in 1931 by Cornelis Gijsbert Gerrit Jan van Steenis in the Journal of the Arnold Arboretum from specimens collected near Boonjie on the Atherton Tableland in 1929. The specific epithet (nervosa) means "many veins".

== Distribution and habitat ==
This pandorea grows in rainforest at altitudes between 450 and 1,150 m (1,480 and 3,770 ft) in north-eastern Queensland and on Mount Elliot in central eastern Queensland.
