= Wunga =

Wunga may refer to:

- Whoonga, a type of heroin used in South Africa
- Wunga Island, an island in North Sumatra, Indonesia

== See also ==
- Wonga (disambiguation)
