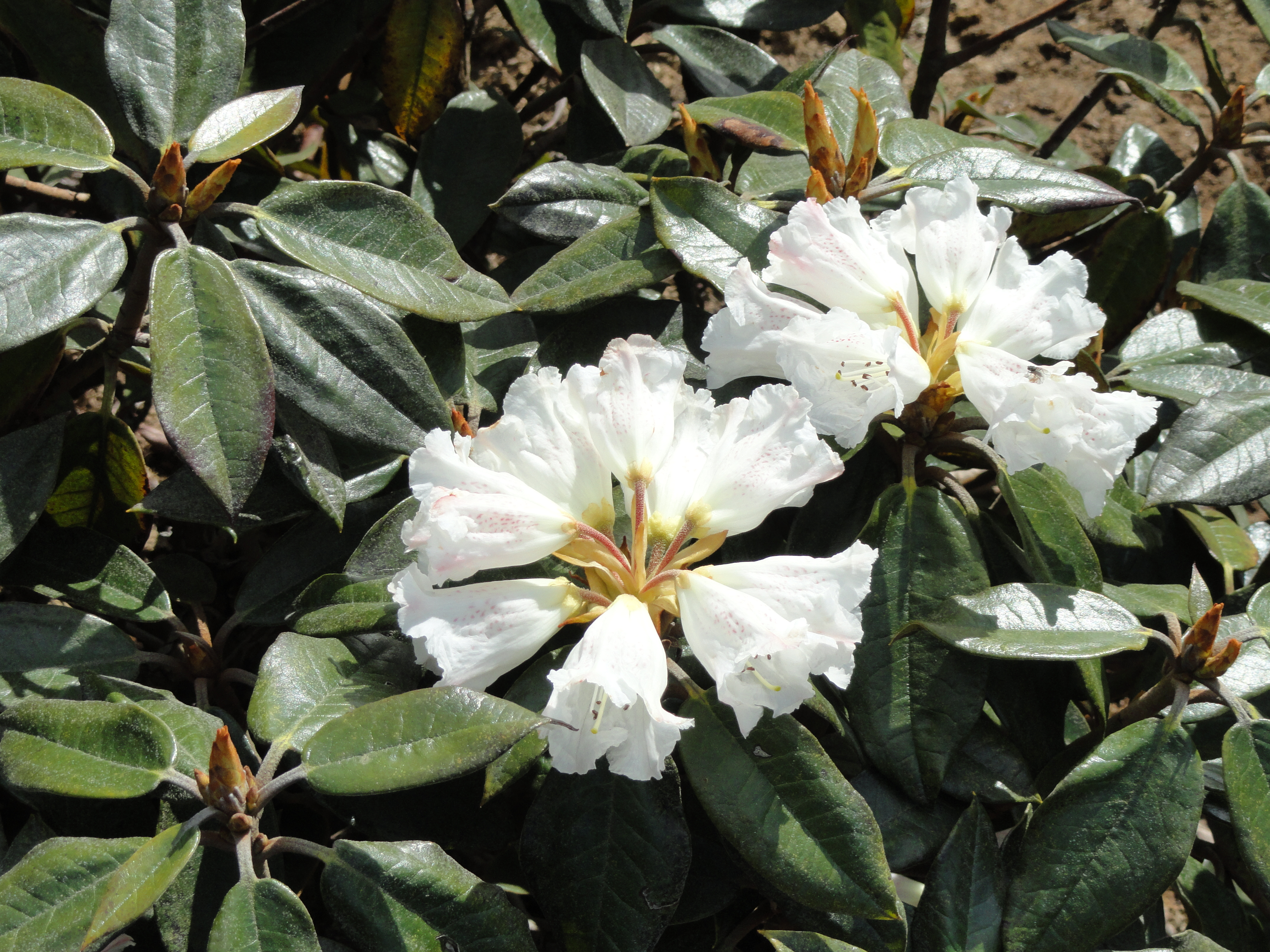

Scientific classification
- Kingdom: Plantae
- Clade: Tracheophytes
- Clade: Angiosperms
- Clade: Eudicots
- Clade: Asterids
- Order: Ericales
- Family: Ericaceae
- Genus: Rhododendron
- Species: R. bureavii

Binomial name
- Rhododendron bureavii Franch.

Synonyms
- Rhododendron bureavioides Balf. f.; Rhododendron cruentum H. Lév.

= Rhododendron bureavii =

Species of plant

Rhododendron bureavii, the Bureau rhododendron (Chinese: 锈红杜鹃; pinyin: xiùhóng dùjuān), is a species of flowering plant in the heath family Ericaceae. It is native to western Sichuan and northern Yunnan, China, where it lives at altitudes of 2,800–4,500 m (9,200–14,800 ft).

Growing to 2.5 m (8.2 ft) tall and broad, it is an evergreen shrub. The leathery leaves are elliptic to obovate-oblong, 6–14 by 2.5–5 cm in size. New leaf growth is covered in a fuzzy brown indumentum that remains on the underside of the mature leaves. In mid-spring, the Bureau rhododendron produces trusses of bell-shaped flowers. The flowers are pink in bud, fading to white when open, with purple spots on the interior.

In cultivation in the UK, Rhododendron bureavii has gained the Royal Horticultural Society's Award of Garden Merit. Like most rhododendrons it prefers an acid soil and dappled sunshine. It is hardy down to −20 °C (−4 °F).

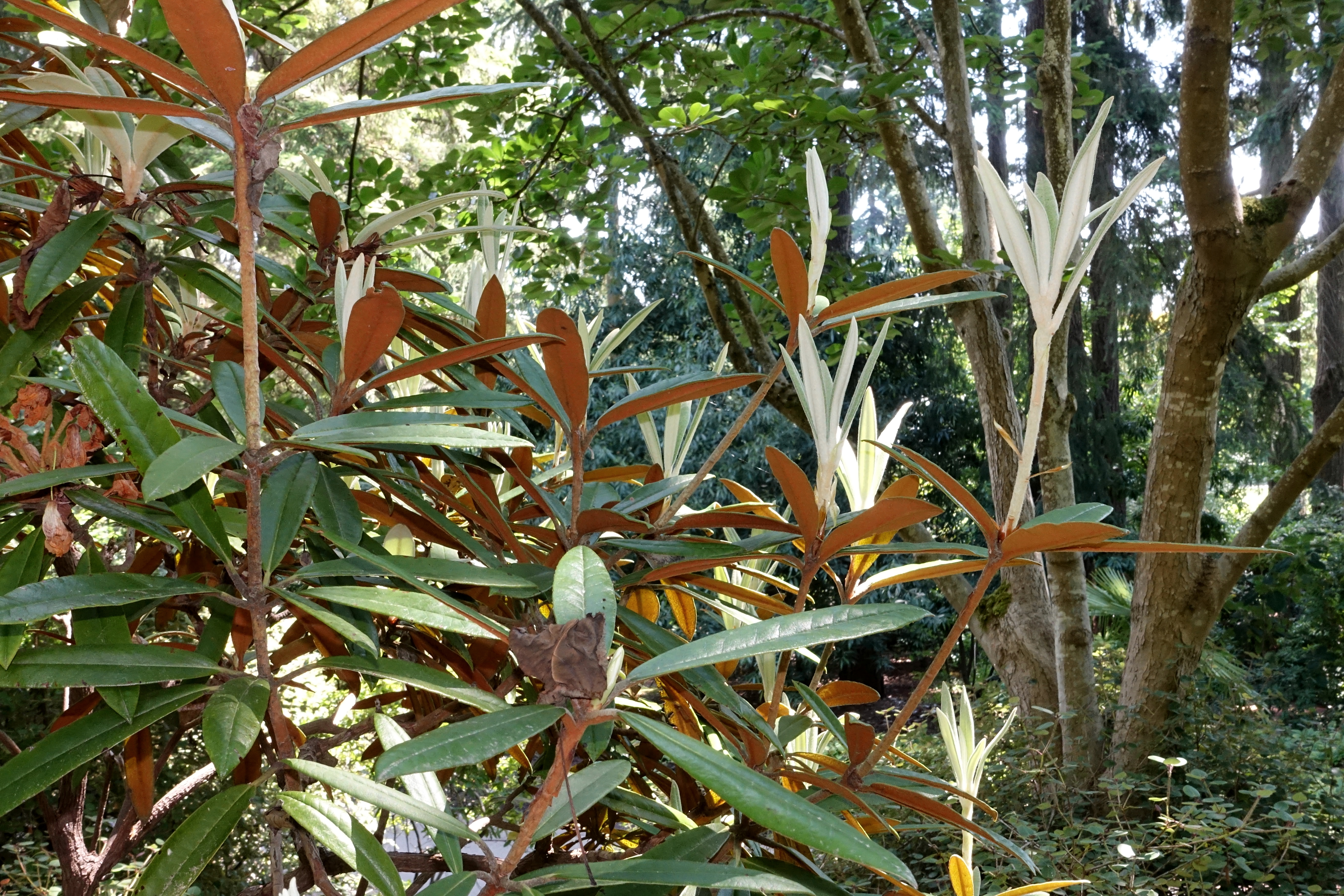
The indumentum on the underside of the leaves

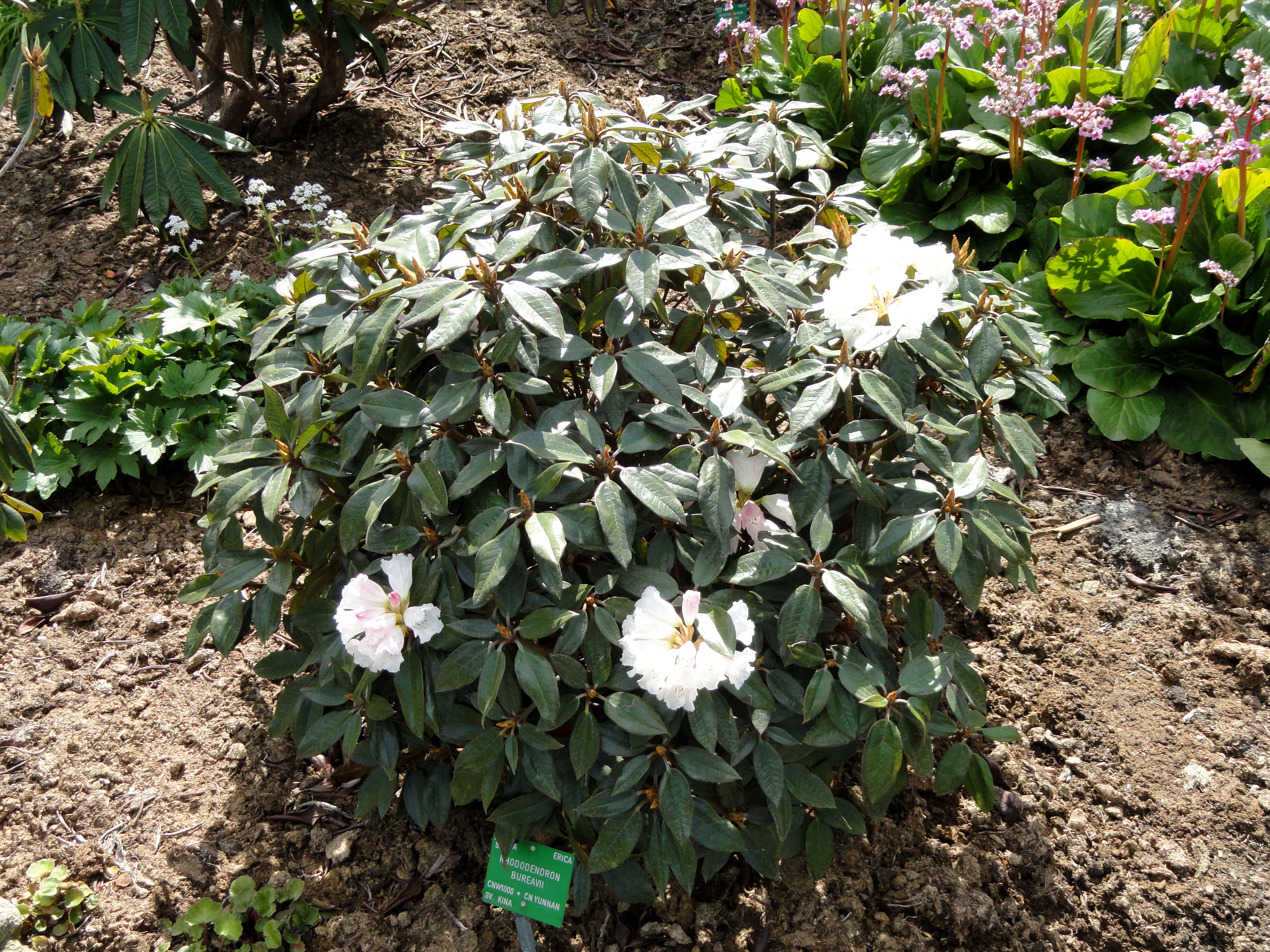
In cultivation
