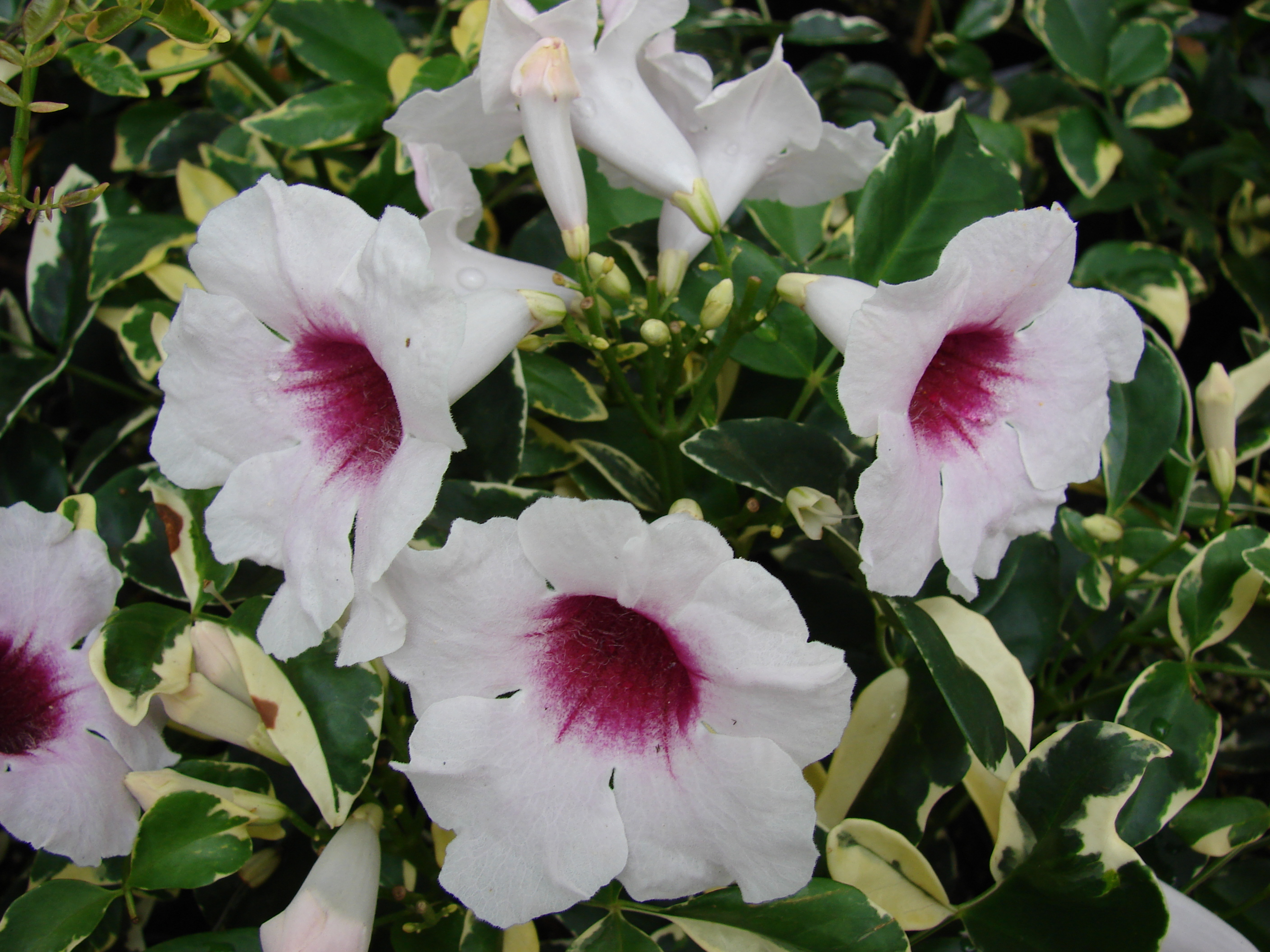
- Pandorea jasminoides

Scientific classification
- Kingdom: Plantae
- Clade: Tracheophytes
- Clade: Angiosperms
- Clade: Eudicots
- Clade: Asterids
- Order: Lamiales
- Family: Bignoniaceae
- Tribe: Tecomeae
- Genus: Pandorea (Endl.) Spach

Species
- See text

= Pandorea =

Genus of vines

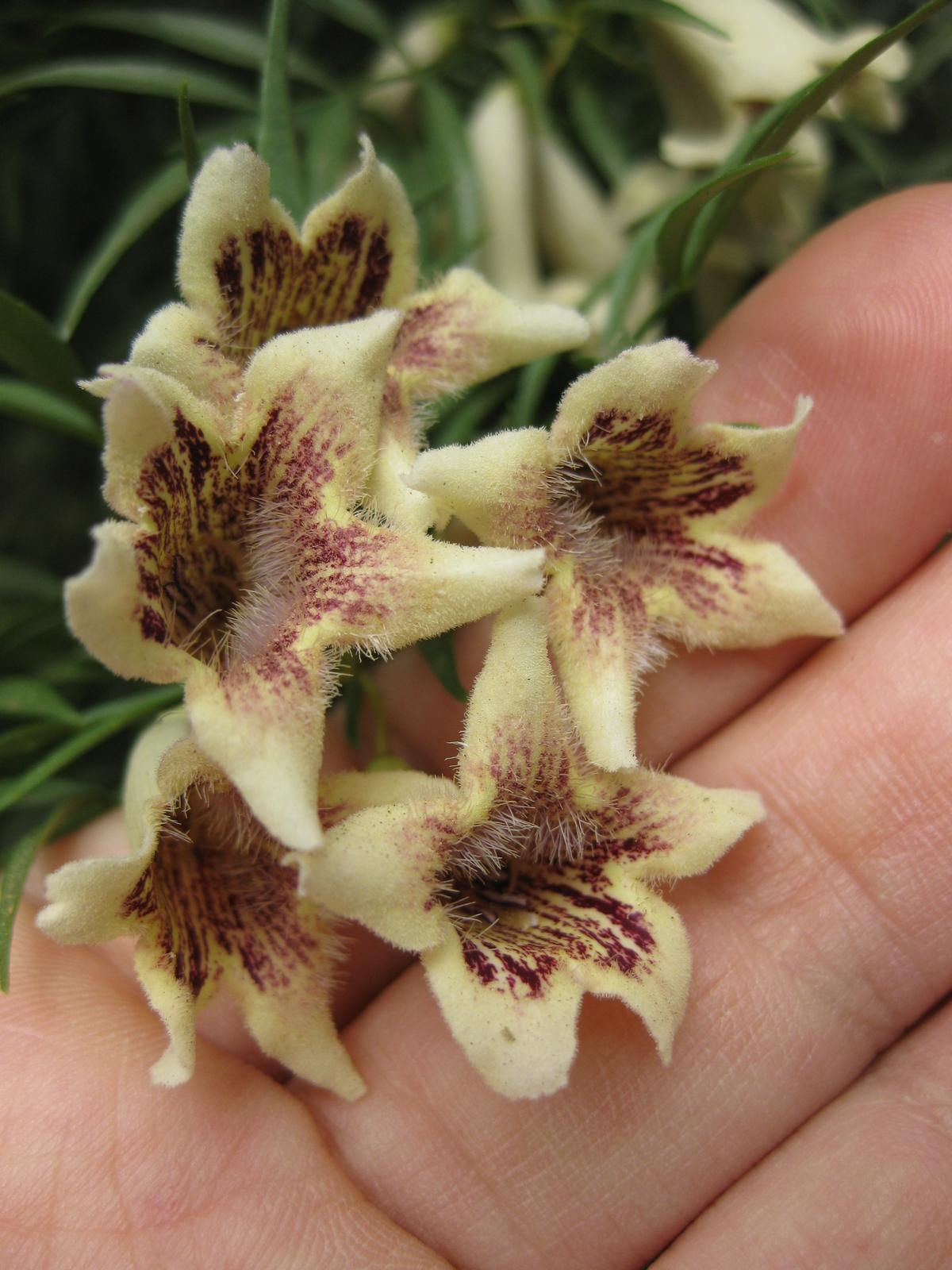
Pandorea doratoxylon

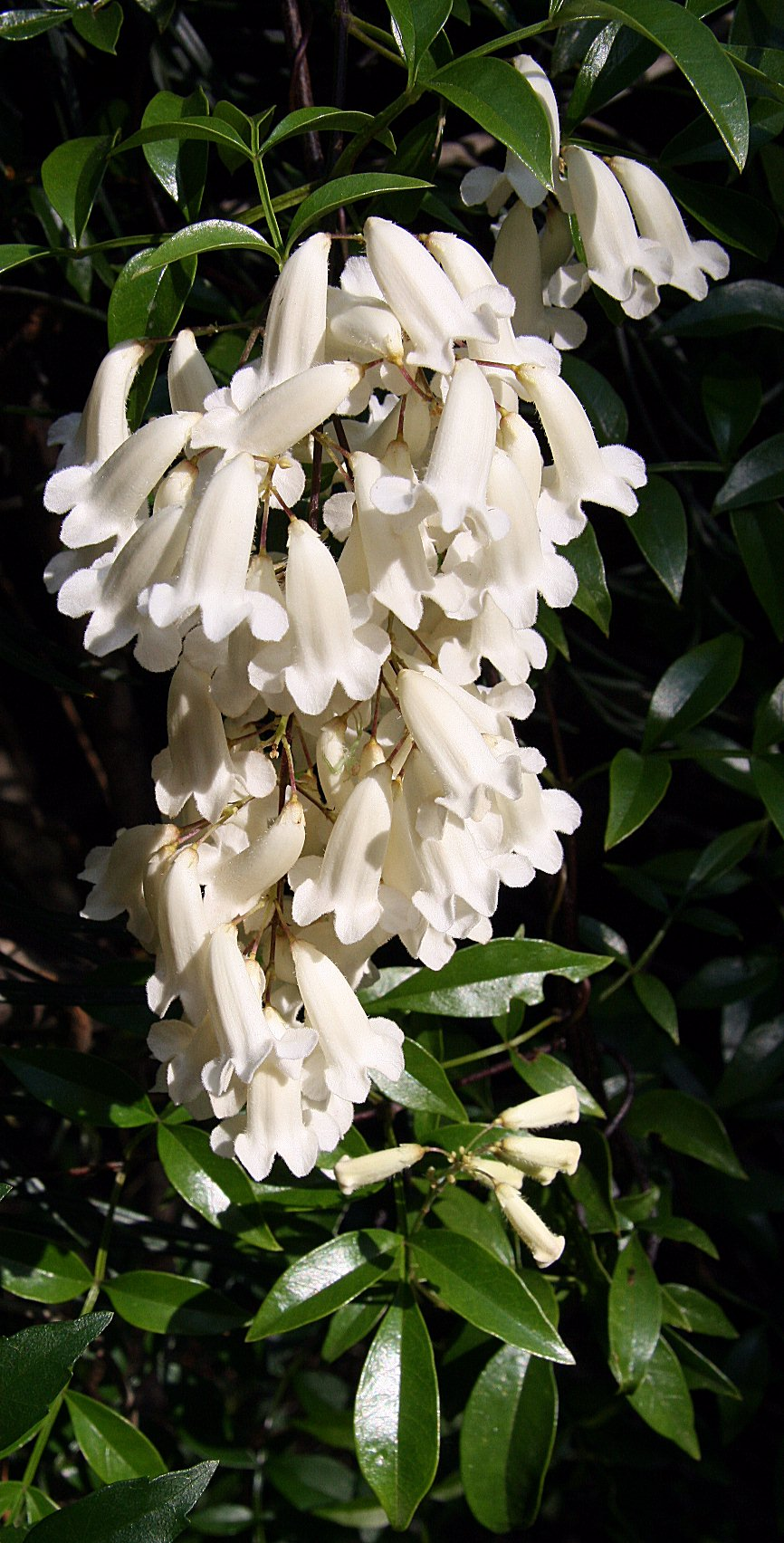
Pandorea pandorana

Pandorea is a genus of nine species of flowering plants in the family Bignoniaceae and is native to Australia, Malesia, New Guinea and New Caledonia. Plants in the genus Pandorea are mostly woody climbers with imparipinnate leaves arranged in opposite pairs, flowers in groups with tube-shaped flowers, and winged seeds.

== Description ==
Plants in the genus Pandorea are woody, evergreen climbers, rarely shrubs and have imparipinnate leaves arranged in opposite pairs and do not possess tendrils. The flowers are arranged on the ends of the stems or in upper leaf axils, sometimes appearing as racemes, each flower on a pedicel. The five sepals are fused at the base forming a bell-shaped or cup-shaped tube with short lobes. The five petals are joined at the base with two "lips" and there are two pairs of two stamens. The fruit is a capsule containing many flat, winged seeds.

== Taxonomy ==
In 1838, Stephan Endlicher described the genus Pandorea, initially as a section of the genus Tecoma in his Genera Plantarum. Édouard Spach raised it to a genus in his monograph Histoire Naturelle des Vegetaux. Phanerogames. The genus name is a reference to Pandora of Greek mythology who opened a jar (Pandora's box), releasing all the evils of the world. The original species was connected with a plague of insects on Norfolk Island.

=== Species list ===
The following is a list of Pandorea species accepted by Plants of the World Online as of October 2021:

- Pandorea baileyana (Maiden & R.T.Baker) Steenis – large-leaved wonga vine (Qld., N.S.W.)
- Pandorea doratoxylon (J.M.Black) J.M.Black (Qld., N.S.W.)
- Pandorea floribunda (A.Cunn. ex DC.) Guymer (Qld., N.S.W.)
- Pandorea jasminoides (Lindl.) K.Schum. – bower of beauty, bower vine, bower climber (Qld., N.S.W.)
- Pandorea linearis (F.M.Bailey) Guymer (Qld.)
- Pandorea montana (Diels) Steenis (New Guinea)
- Pandorea nervosa Steenis (Qld.)
- Pandorea pandorana (Andrews) Steenis – wonga wonga vine (Lesser Sunda Islands, Maluku, New Caledonia, New Guinea, N.S.W., Norfolk Island, N.T., Qld., Solomon Islands, Tas., Vanuatu, Vic.)
  - Pandorea pandorana subsp. austrocaledonica (Bureau) P.S.Green (New Caledonia, Norfolk Island, Vanuatu)
  - Pandorea pandorana subsp. pandorana (Bureau) P.S.Green (Lesser Sunda Islands, Maluku, New Guinea, N.S.W., N.T., Qld., Solomon Islands, Tas., Vic.)
- Pandorea stenantha Diels (New Guinea)
