= Wanga (disambiguation) =

The Wanga (AbaWanga) are a tribe of the Luhya people of Kenya.

Wanga may also refer to:

- Wanga (mythology), figure in African mythology
- Wanga Kingdom, a Kenyan Bantu kingdom

== People with the surname ==
- Allan Wanga (born 1985), Kenyan footballer
- Federico Wanga (died 1218), Prince-bishop of Trento
- Gilbert Imbula Wanga (born 1992), Belgian footballer
- Gladys Atieno Nyasuna Wanga, Kenyan politician
- Javier Wanga (born 1981), Aruban judoka
- Jean Dénis Wanga (born 1975), Cameroonian footballer
- Jerónimo Elavoko Wanga (died 2007), Angolan politician
- Soleil Wanga, DR Congolese musician

== See also ==
- Obeah and Wanga, terms used by occultist Aleister Crowley
- Includes people with first name Wanga
