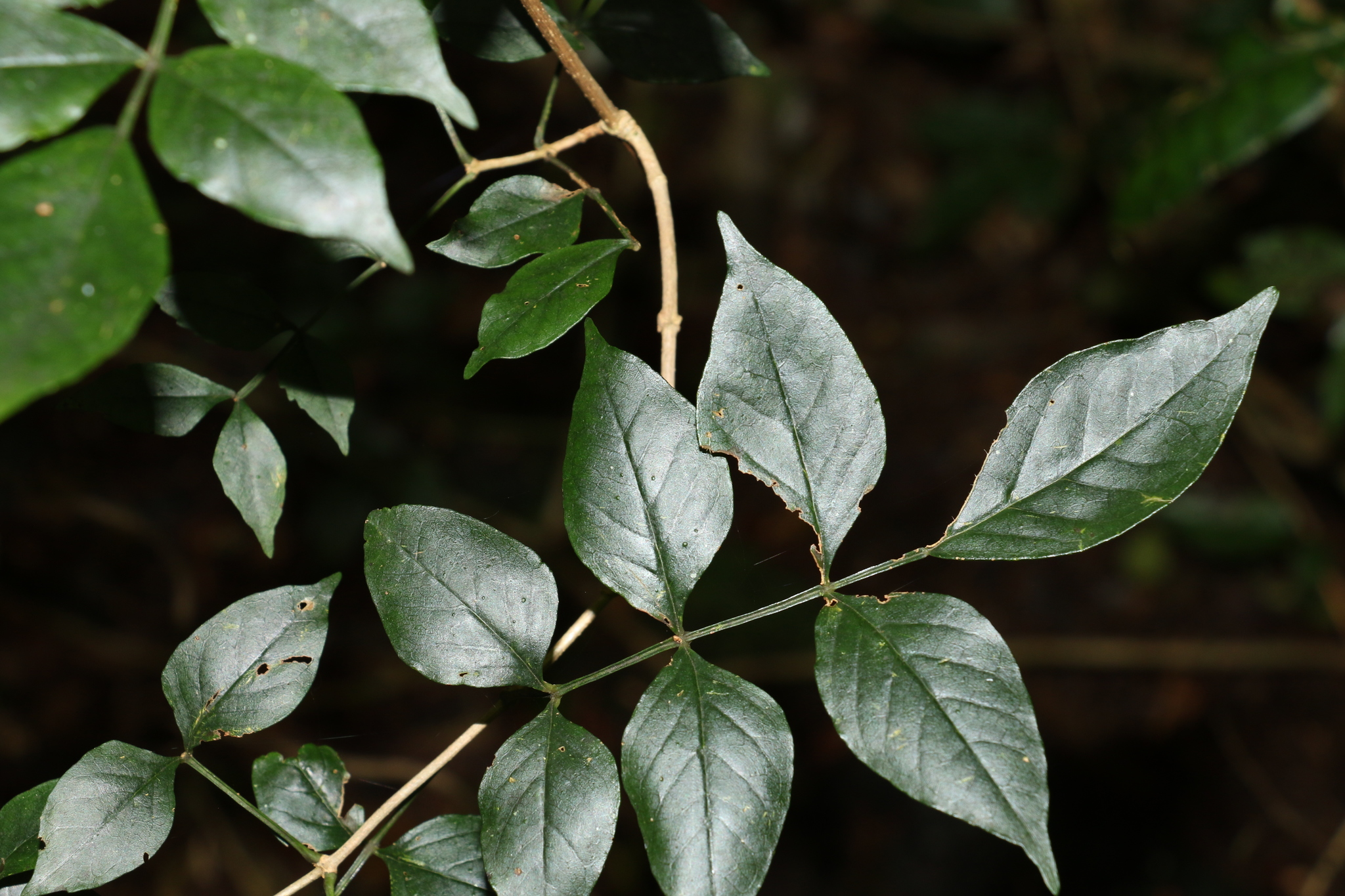

Scientific classification
- Kingdom: Plantae
- Clade: Tracheophytes
- Clade: Angiosperms
- Clade: Eudicots
- Clade: Asterids
- Order: Lamiales
- Family: Bignoniaceae
- Genus: Pandorea
- Species: P. baileyana

Binomial name
- Pandorea baileyana (Maiden & R.T.Baker) Steenis

Synonyms
- Tecoma baileyana Maiden & R.T.Baker

= Pandorea baileyana =

Species of vine

Pandorea baileyana, commonly known as large-leaved wonga vine, is a species of flowering plant in the family Bignoniaceae and is endemic to eastern Australia. It is a woody climber with pinnate leaves that have seven to nine egg-shaped leaflets, and relatively small cream-coloured flowers that are pink inside.

== Description ==
Pandorea baileyana is a woody climber. Its leaves are usually arranged in opposite pairs and are 130–300 mm (5.1–11.8 in) long with seven or nine egg-shaped leaflets 55–140 mm (2.2–5.5 in) long and 20–55 mm (0.79–2.17 in) wide. Each leaf is glabrous with prominent main veins, on a petiole 20–70 mm (0.79–2.76 in) long, each leaflet on a petiolule 2–3 mm (0.079–0.118 in) long. The flowers are arranged in leaf axils in groups 100–300 mm (3.9–11.8 in) long, the five sepals 3–4 mm (0.12–0.16 in) long. The petal tube is 10–15 mm (0.39–0.59 in) long and 2–4 mm (0.079–0.157 in) in diameter, cream-coloured and pink in the throat with lobes 2–3 mm (0.079–0.118 in) long. Flowering occurs from September to March.

== Taxonomy ==
This species was first formally described in 1896 by Joseph Maiden and Richard Thomas Baker, who gave it the name Tecome baileyana in the Proceedings of the Linnean Society of New South Wales from specimens collected near Mullumbimby Creek by William Baeuerlen. In 1927, Cornelius van Steenis changed the name to Pandorea baileyana. The specific epithet (baileyana) honours Frederick Manson Bailey.

== Distribution and habitat ==
Pandorea baileyana grows in rainforest from south-eastern Queensland to Minyon Falls in northern New South Wales.
