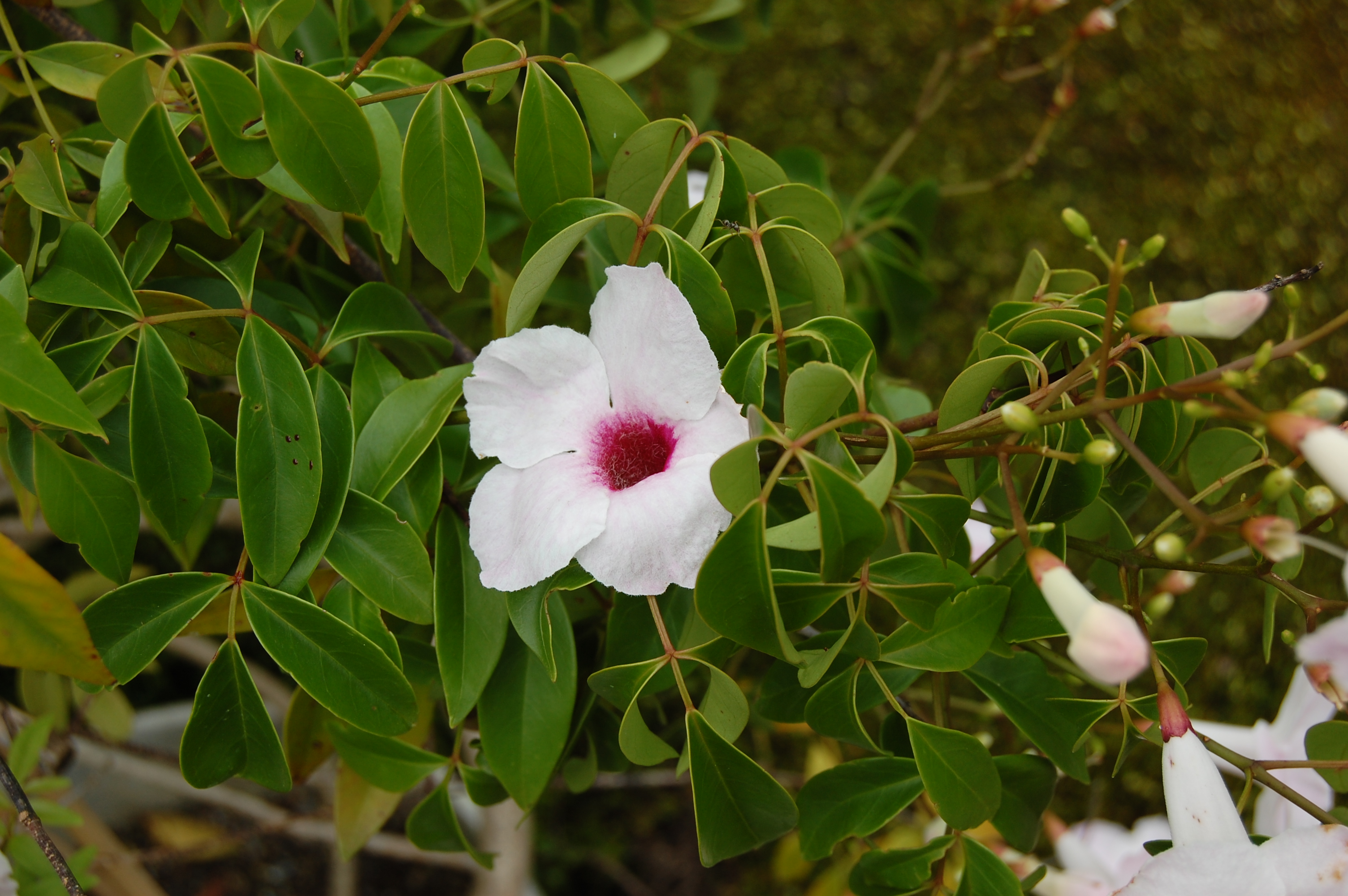

Scientific classification
- Kingdom: Plantae
- Clade: Tracheophytes
- Clade: Angiosperms
- Clade: Eudicots
- Clade: Asterids
- Order: Lamiales
- Family: Bignoniaceae
- Genus: Pandorea
- Species: P. jasminoides

Binomial name
- Pandorea jasminoides (G.Don) K.Schum.

Synonyms
- Pandorea jasminoides var. alba Rehder; Pandorea jasminoides (G.Don) K.Schum. var. jasminoides; Tecoma jasminoides G.Don; Tecoma jasminoides Lindl. nom. illeg.

= Pandorea jasminoides =

Bower of beauty

Species of vine

Pandorea jasminoides, also known by the common names bower of beauty and bower vine, is a species of flowering plant in the family Bignoniaceae and is endemic to eastern Australia. It is a woody climber with pinnate leaves that have three to nine egg-shaped leaflets and white or pink trumpet-shaped flowers that are red and hairy inside. It is also grown as an ornamental.

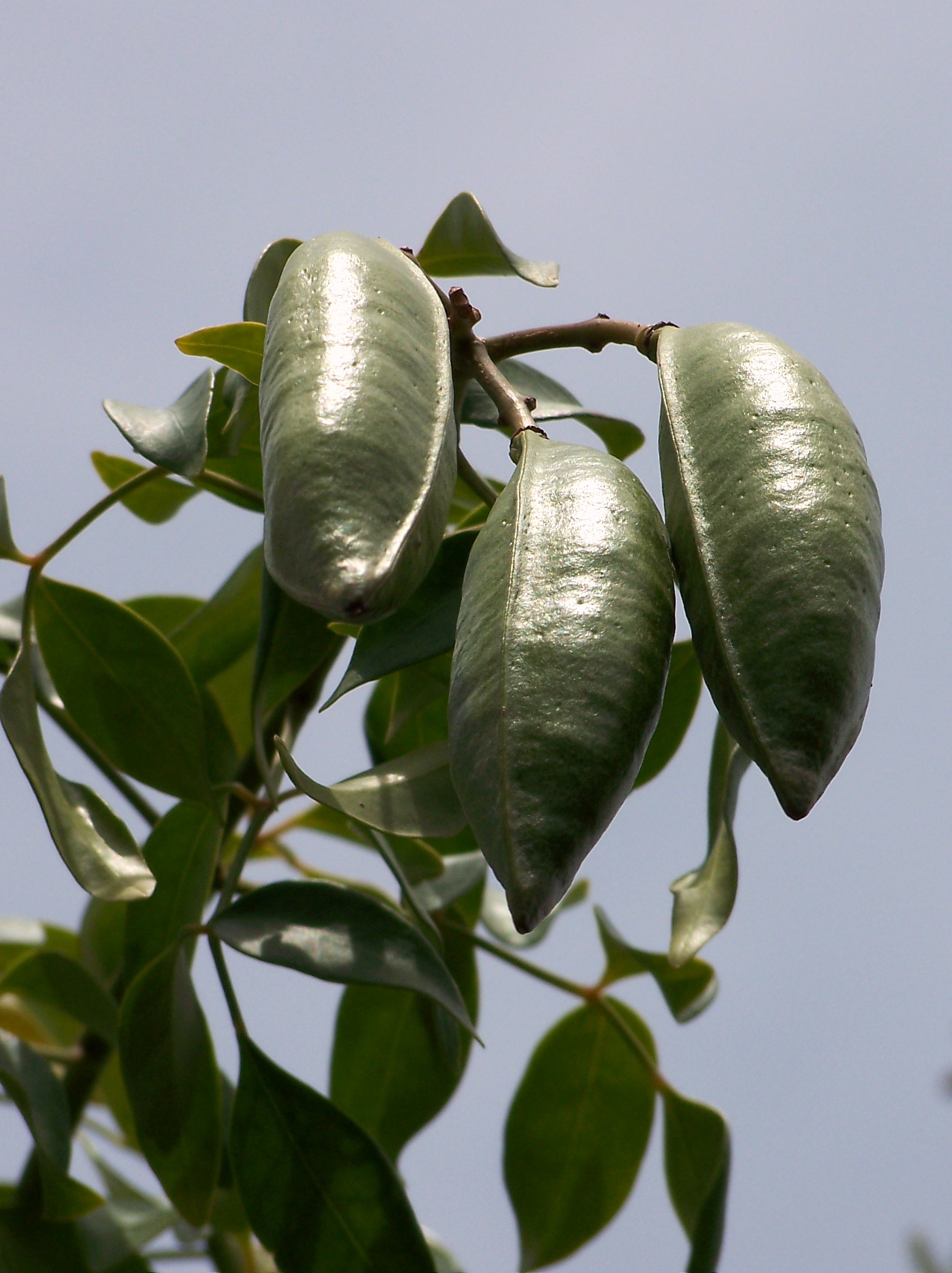
Fruit

== Description ==
Pandorea jasminoides is a woody climber with dark brown bark and glabrous stems. The leaves are mainly arranged in opposite pairs along the stems or sometimes in whorls of three, and are 120–170 mm (4.7–6.7 in) long and pinnate with three to nine leaflets. The leaflets are egg-shaped to more or less lance-shaped, 45–60 mm (1.8–2.4 in) long and 15–30 mm (0.59–1.18 in) wide. The leaves are on a petiole 20–40 mm (0.79–1.57 in) long, the lateral leaflets on petiolules 2–4 mm (0.079–0.157 in) long and the end leaflet on a petiolule 5–30 mm (0.20–1.18 in) long.

=== Inflorescences ===
The flowers are borne on the ends of stems or in upper leaf axils in groups 60–120 mm (2.4–4.7 in) long. The five sepals are fused at the base forming a cup-shaped tube 5–8 mm (0.20–0.31 in) long with lobes 1–2 mm (0.039–0.079 in) long. The five petals are fused at the base forming a trumpet shape that is white or pink on the outside and pink to red and hairy inside, the tube 40–60 mm (1.6–2.4 in) long with lobes 20–30 mm (0.79–1.18 in) long. The four stamens are enclosed in the petal tube. Flowering occurs from September to March and the fruit is an oblong or oval capsule 40–60 mm (1.6–2.4 in) long and 10–20 mm (0.39–0.79 in) wide containing winged seeds.

== Taxonomy ==
Bower of beauty was first formally described in 1837 by George Don, who gave it the name Tecoma jasminoides in his book, A General History of Dichlamydeous Plants. In 1894, Karl Moritz Schumann changed the name to Pandorea jasminoides in Die Natürlichen Pflanzenfamilien.

== Distribution and habitat ==
Pandorea jasminoides grows in rainforest from central eastern Queensland to the Hastings River in New South Wales with isolated occurrences further south in Kangaroo Valley and as far north as Mount Lewis National Park in far northern Queensland.

== Use in horticulture ==
This climber can be propagated from seed, stem cuttings or by layering. Its vigorous growth makes it suitable for screening or climbing on pergolas and trellises; however, it should not be planted near sewer pipes. The species has gained the Royal Horticultural Society's Award of Garden Merit.

Pandorea 'Lady Di', a cultivar with snow white, trumpet flowers is also a vigorous climber.

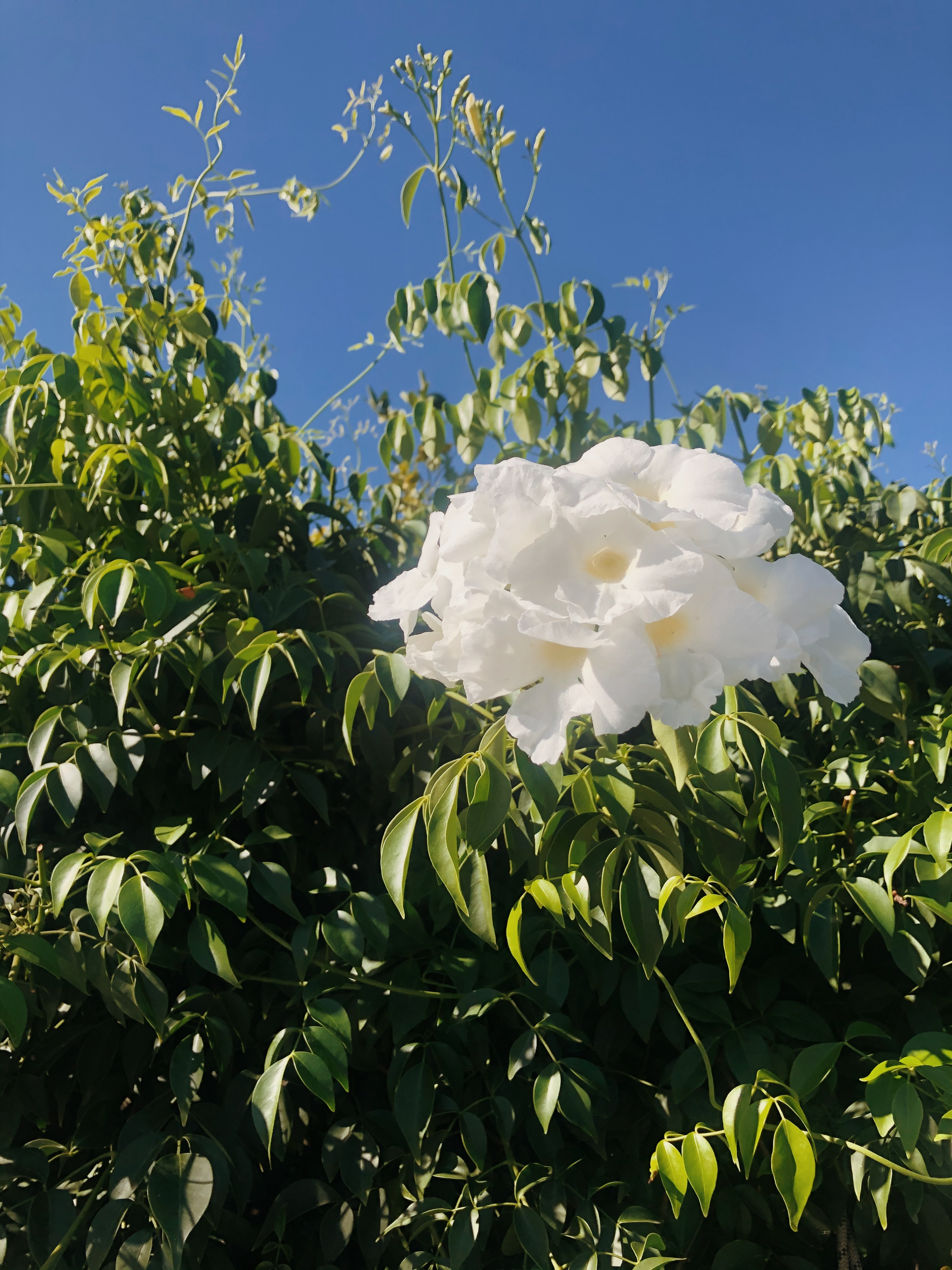
Pandorea jasminoides 'Lady Di'
