= Édouard Bureau =

French physician and botanist (1830-1918)

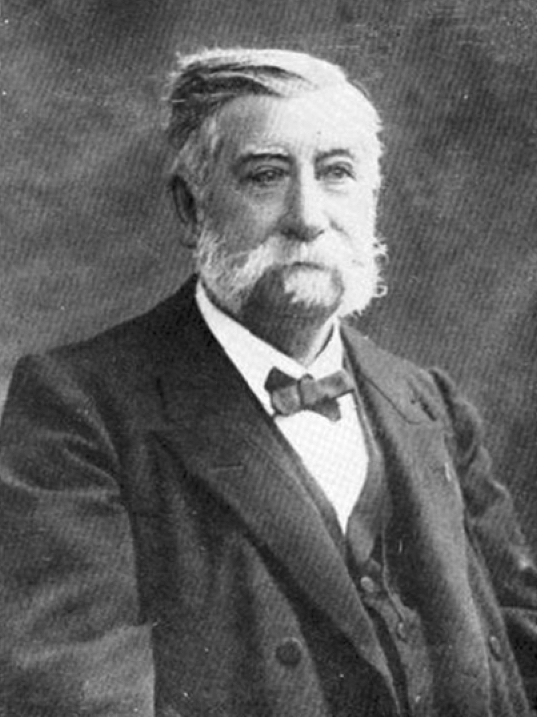
- Born: 25 May 1830; Nantes, France
- Died: 14 December 1918 (aged 88); Paris, France
- Scientific career
- Fields: Botany, physics
- Thesis: Monographie des Bignoniacées (1864)

Louis Édouard Bureau (25 May 1830 in Nantes – 14 December 1918 in Paris) was a French physician and botanist.

Édouard Bureau began his medical studies in Nantes in 1848, where he held the post of director of the Muséum de Nantes (Nantes Museum). He completed his medical degree in Paris in 1852. In 1872 he obtained a post as a naturalist assistant at the Muséum national d'histoire naturelle (French National Museum of Natural History) in the laboratory of Adolphe Brongniart, where he replaced Edmond Tulasne. In 1874 he received appointment to the new botany post dealing with classification. Beginning in 1875, he was a director of the herbaria at the museum. He was a professor at the museum from 1874 until he retired in 1905. Adrien Franchet was his assistant in the 80's. He was succeeded by Paul Henri Lecomte.

Bureau was one of the founders of the Société botanique de France (French Botanical Society) and was the chairman in 1875, 1883, 1902 and 1905. In 1895 he was elected to the French Academy of Medicine. From 1895 to 1917, he was a member of the Comité travaux of the historiques et scientifiques (French Committee for Historical and Scientific Endeavors).

Bureau was a significant contributor to Baillon’s Dictionnaire de Botanique (Botanical Dictionary). He wrote the chapters on the Moraceae, including the Artocarpeae (the breadfruit tribe), for volume XVII (1873) of Candolle’s Prodromus systematis naturalis regni vegetabilis (A preliminary natural system for the plant kingdom). Together with Karl Moritz Schumann, he wrote the Bignoniaceae section of Volume VIII of Carl Friedrich Philipp von Martius’s Flora brasiliensis (Flora of Brazil).

Bureau was particularly interested in paleobotany and significantly increased the museum's paleontological holdings. From 1910–1914 he published a two-volume work on the fossils of the Loire basin, and in 1911, he published a further work specifically on the Devonian there.

The species Rhododendron bureavii, belonging to the taxonomically complex group of elepidote (nonscaly) rhododendrons, was named in his honor and was based upon specimens from China in his private collection.

== Selected publications ==
- Monographie des Bignoniacées: ou histoire générale et particulière des plantes qui composent cet ordre naturel, 1864 OCLC 5932136
- with Adrien Franchet (1834–1900) Plantes nouvelles du Thibet et de la Chine occidentale : recueillies pendant le voyage de M. Bonvalot et du prince Henri d'Orléans en 1890, 1891 OCLC 25054778.
- De la famille des Loganiacées et des plantes qu'elle fournít a la médecine. 1856.
- Notice sur les travaux scientifiques de M.É. Bureau. 1901, 1864.
- Révision du genre Catalpa. 1894.
- Bassin houiller de la basse Loire. 1910–1914, Etudes des gîtes minéraux de la France
- Notice sur la géologie de la Loire-Inférieure… avec listes des végétaux fossiles published in Nantes et la Loire inférieure, III Imprimerie Grimaud, Nantes (1900), pp. 99–522.
