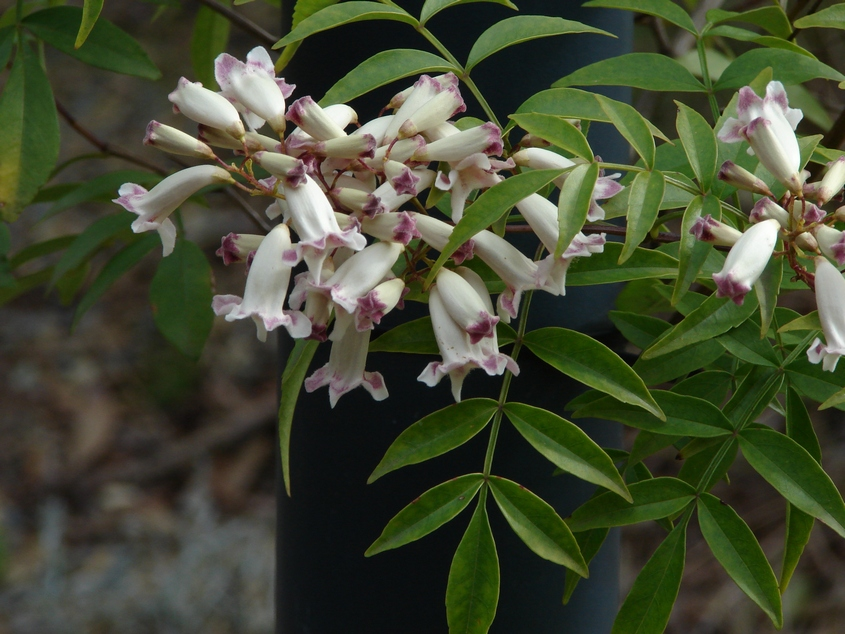
- Pandorea pandorana

Scientific classification
- Kingdom: Plantae
- Clade: Embryophytes
- Clade: Tracheophytes
- Clade: Spermatophytes
- Clade: Angiosperms
- Clade: Eudicots
- Clade: Asterids
- Order: Lamiales
- Family: Bignoniaceae
- Genus: Pandorea
- Species: P. pandorana

Binomial name
- Pandorea pandorana (Andrews) Steenis

Synonyms
- List: Bignonia australis R.Br. nom. illeg., nom.superfl.; Bignonia meonantha Link; Bignonia pandorae Ker Gawl. nom. illeg., nom. superfl.; Bignonia pandorana Andrews; Bignonia pandorea Vent.; Pandorea australis Spach nom. illeg., nom. superfl.; Pandorea australis subsp. meonantha (Link) Steenis; Pandorea australis subsp. pandorea (Vent.) Steenis; Pandorea australis var. meonantha Link) Domin; Pandorea australis var. oxleyi (DC.) Domin; Pandorea australis var. rosea Rehder; Pandorea oxleyi Domin nom. inval., pro syn.; Pandorea pandorana subsp. A; Pandorea pandorana (Andrews) Steenis subsp. pandorana; Tecoma australis R.Br. nom. illeg., nom. superfl.; Tecoma australis var. meonantha (Link) DC.; Tecoma australis var. pandorea (Vent.) F.M.Bailey; Tecoma diversifolia G.Don; Tecoma latrobei F.Muell. nom. inval., nom. nud.; Tecoma latrobei Teijsm. & Binn. nom. inval., nom. nud.; Tecoma meonantha (Link) Sweet; Tecoma ochroxantha Kunth isonym; Tecoma ochroxantha Kunth & C.D.Bouché; Tecoma oxleyi DC.; Tecoma pandorana (Andrews) Skeels; Tecoma pandorea Steud. nom. inval., pro syn.

= Pandorea pandorana =

Wonga wonga vine

Species of plant

Pandorea pandorana, commonly known as the wonga wonga vine or wonga-vine, is a species of flowering plant in the family Bignoniaceae and is native to Australia, Malesia and the southwestern Pacific region. It is a woody scrambler or climber with pinnate leaves, juvenile leaves differing from those of mature plants. The flowers are tubular or funnel-shaped and white with purple markings and the fruit are capsules containing winged seeds. It is easy species to germinate and is a popular garden plant. Common cultivars include the yellow-flowered P. 'Golden Showers', the white-flowered P. 'Snowbells', and the pinkish P. 'Ruby Belle'. The wood was used in making spears for woomeras in the Central and Western deserts.

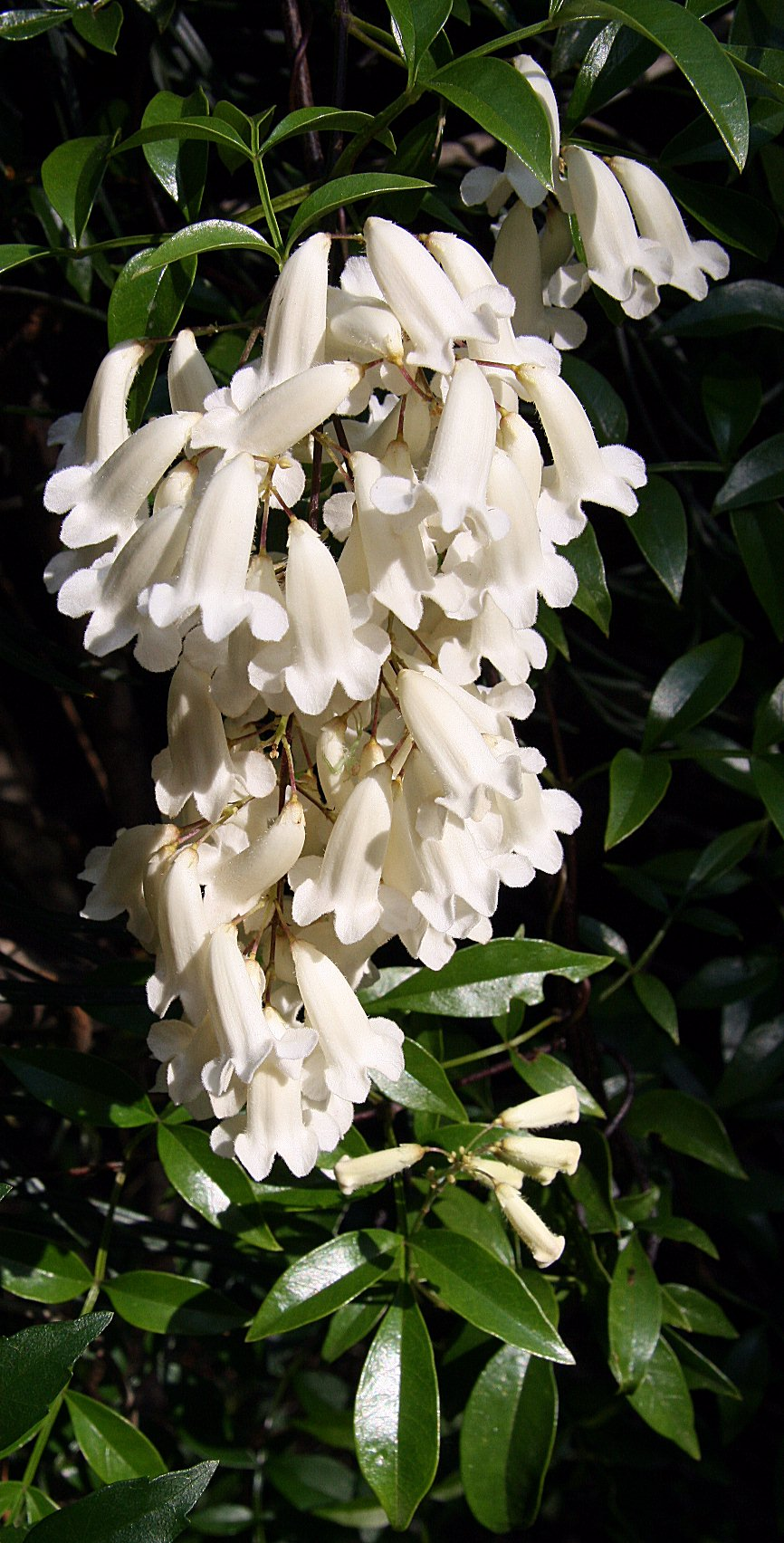
White form (Pandorea 'Snow Bells')

== Description ==
Pandorea pandorana is a glabrous woody climber or scrambler, sometimes reaching a height of 6 m (20 ft) or more. The leaves are arranged in opposite pairs and pinnate, those of juvenile plants 20–80 mm (0.79–3.15 in) long with eight to seventeen wavy-edged leaflets. Adult leaves have mostly three to nine egg-shaped leaflets on a petiole 10–45 mm (0.39–1.77 in) long, the leaflets 25–80 mm (0.98–3.15 in) long and 5–30 mm (0.20–1.18 in) wide on petiolules 1–2 mm (0.039–0.079 in) long.

The flowers are arranged in groups up to 220 mm (8.7 in) long with several to many thyrses. The flowers are pendent, tubular or funnel-shaped, each on a pedicel 2–8 mm (0.079–0.315 in) long and white to cream-coloured with purple markings. The sepals are 3–5 mm (0.12–0.20 in) long and joined at the base with lobes about 1 mm (0.039 in) long. The petal tube is 10–25 mm (0.39–0.98 in) long, the tubular part more or less straight and 5–10 mm (0.20–0.39 in) in diameter, bearded on the inside, the lobes 3–6 mm (0.12–0.24 in) long. Flowering occurs from June to December followed in summer by oblong capsules 4–6 mm (0.16–0.24 in) long and 10–20 mm (0.39–0.79 in) wide containing a large number of winged seeds.

== Taxonomy ==
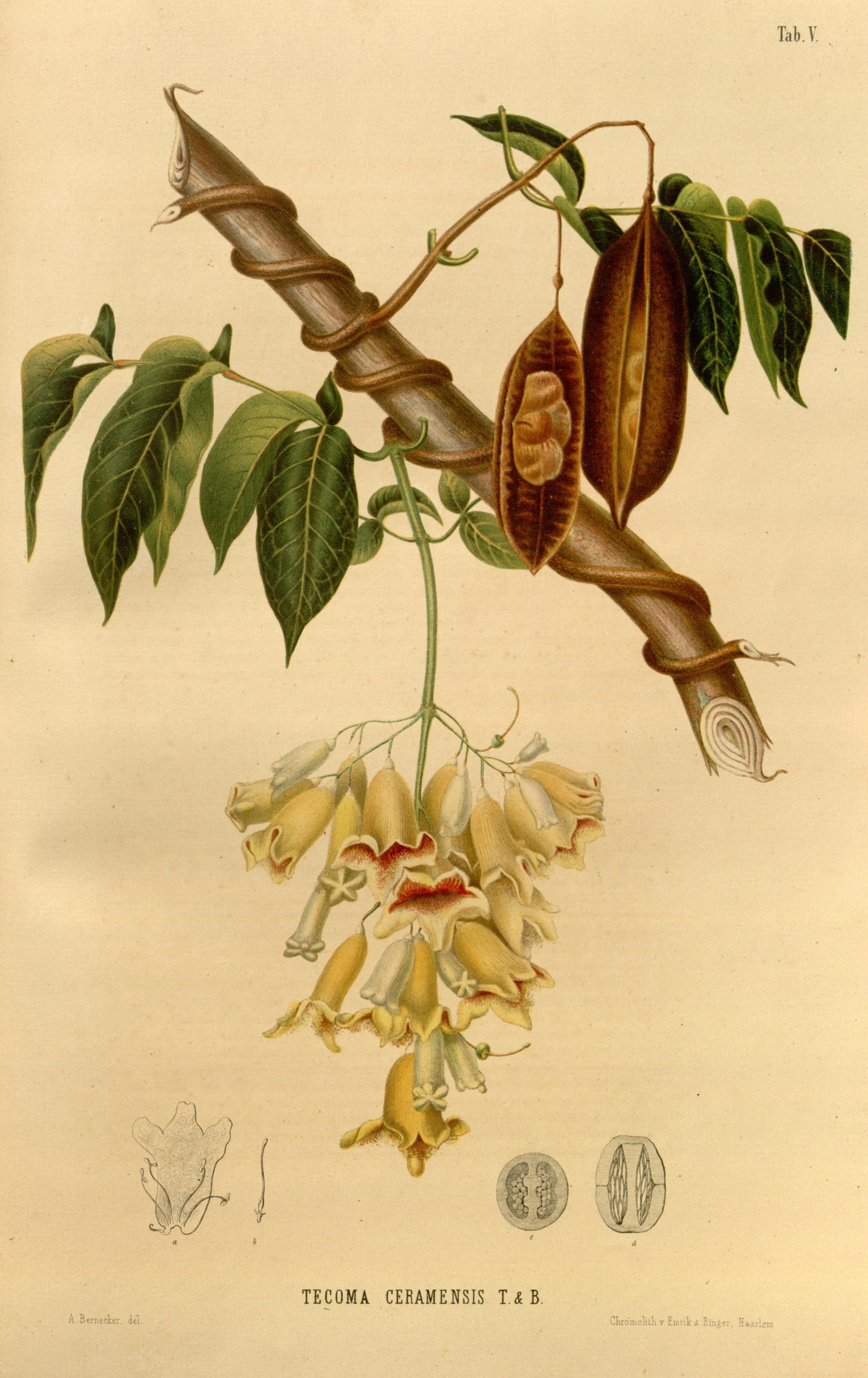
Pandorea pandorana subsp. pandorana illustrated in Annales Musei Botanici Lugduno-Batavi.

Wonga wonga vine was first formally described in 1800 by English botanist Henry Cranke Andrews who gave it the name Bignonia pandorana in The Botanist's Repository for New, and Rare Plants from specimens grown in London by Lee and Kennedy from seed collected on Norfolk Island by Colonel Paterson. In 1928 Cornelis Gijsbert Gerrit Jan van Steenis gave the species its present name. Both the generic and specific name are derived from the Greek mythological woman Pandora. The Scottish botanist Robert Brown had described it as Tecoma australis but this name was ruled invalid.

In 1862, Louis Édouard Bureau formally described Tecoma austrocaledonica in the Bulletin de la Société botanique de France, later reduced to Pandorea pandorana subsp. austrocaledonica by Peter Shaw Green, but that name is not accepted by the Australian Plant Census.

== Distribution and habitat ==
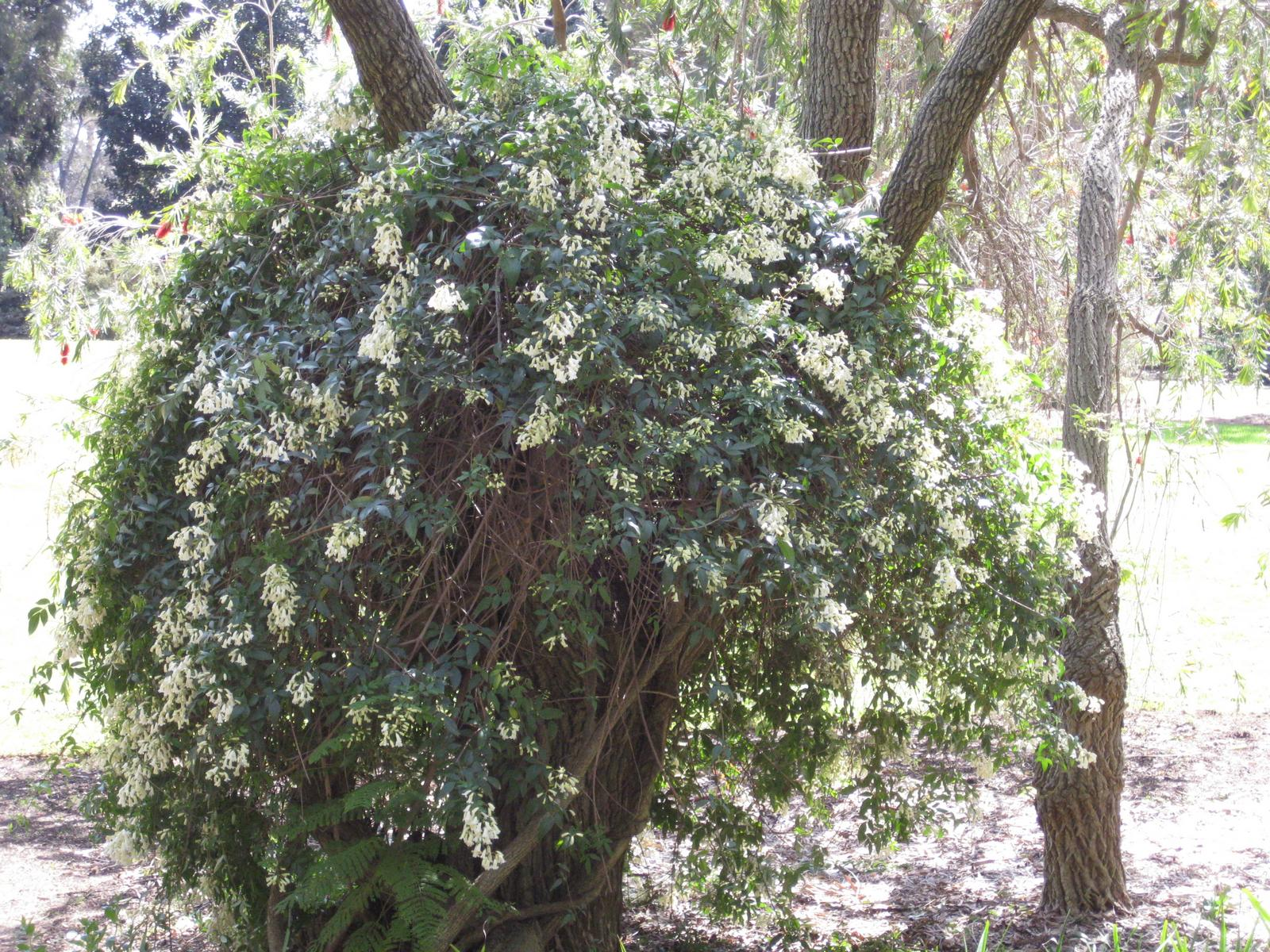
Habit

A highly variable species, it is found across continental Australia in every state. It is also found in Indonesia, Papua New Guinea, the Solomon Islands, New Caledonia and Vanuatu. It is also found on Flinders Island in Bass Strait, but not on mainland Tasmania. In New Zealand the species has become naturalised within disturbed native vegetation near parks and gardens in which it is cultivated.

It occurs in many habitats, from rainforest, to dry sclerophyll forest, to dry scrub and rocky outcrops in arid regions. It can grow in either clay or sand-based soils.

== Uses ==
=== Uses by Indigenous Australians ===
The highly flexible wood of Pandorea pandorana was the most sought after for use in woomera-cast spears among the people of the Central and Western Deserts. Its versatility allowed short pieces to be spliced together if longer ones could not be found. Due to its cultural significance, a group of mythological women with slender and flexible bodies were named after it.

=== Use in horticulture ===
Pandorea pandorana was first raised in England in 1793 by Lee and Kennedy at their nursery in Hammersmith and had flowered in cultivation by 1805. Material was also sent to the garden of the Château de Malmaison under the auspices of Joséphine de Beauharnais. Its floral display makes it a popular and widely grown garden plant. It is an evergreen, half-hardy (hardy to about minus 5 °C once established), twining plant with lovely foliage, particularly so on young plants when it is very finely cut and somewhat fern-like. It is suitable for indoor or outdoor planting. Pruning is necessary to control the quick growing plant, which can overwhelm other plants in a small garden. The plant prefers full-sun to partial shade. It has been argued that the more sun it receives, the more flowers will bloom as a result. The species may be propagated by fresh seed, layering or semi-hardwood tip cuttings.

The Nursery and Garden Industry in Australia promoted P. pandorana as a native alternative to the invasive garden climber Black-eyed Susan (Thunbergia alata).

=== Cultivars ===
Several different coloured cultivars are available, including:

- 'Golden Showers' - a long-flowering vigorous form with brown-tinted yellow flowers originally selected from a plant growing near Kempsey on the New South Wales mid-north coast Initially called "Golden Rain", it was registered by ACRA in 1987.
- 'Ruby Belle' has a red-pink flower with cream throat
- 'Ruby Heart' has a cream-coloured flower with a deep ruby–maroon blotch at the throat
- 'Snowbells' - a vigorous cream-white flowered form, with profuse fragrant flowers

== Cultural reference ==
Judith Wright had her poem, "Wonga vine" published in The Bulletin on 22 December 1948.
