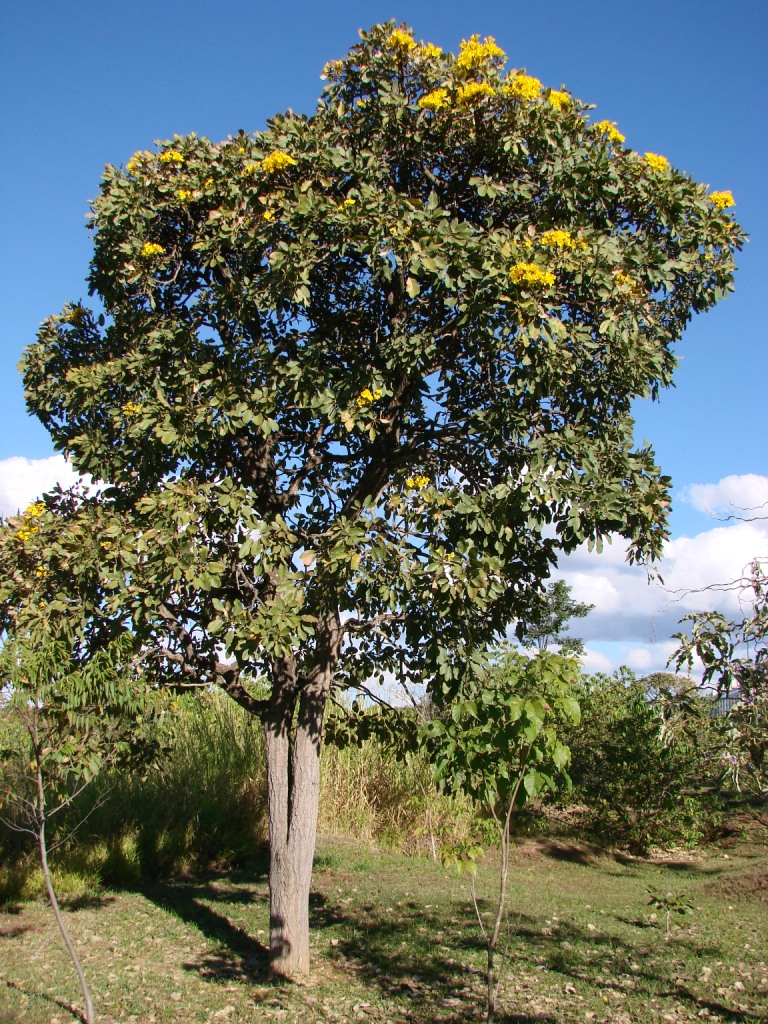
- Tabebuia aurea

Scientific classification
- Kingdom: Plantae
- Clade: Tracheophytes
- Clade: Angiosperms
- Clade: Eudicots
- Clade: Asterids
- Order: Lamiales
- Family: Bignoniaceae
- Tribe: Tecomeae

Genera
- See text

= Tecomeae =

Tribe of trees

Tecomeae is a tribe with 44 genera of trees, shrubs, and vines in the family Bignoniaceae.

== Genera ==
- Argylia
- Astianthus
- Campsidium
- Campsis
- Catalpa (Needs verified)
- Catophractes
- Chilopsis
- Cybistax
- Delostoma
- Deplanchea
- Digomphia
- Dinklageodoxa
- Dolichandrone
- Ekmanianthe
- Fernandoa
- Godmania
- Haplophragma
- Heterophragma
- Incarvillea
- Jacaranda
- Lamiodendron
- Markhamia
- Neosepicaea
- Newbouldia
- Pajanelia
- Pandorea
- Paratecoma
- Pauldopia
- Perianthomega
- Perichlaena
- Podranea
- Radermachera
- Rhigozum
- Romeroa
- Santisukia
- Sparattosperma
- Spathodea
- Spirotecoma
- Stereospermum
- Tabebuia
- Tecoma
- Tecomanthe
- Tecomella
- Zeyheria
