= Gallienia =

Scientific classification
- Kingdom: Plantae
- Clade: Tracheophytes
- Clade: Angiosperms
- Clade: Eudicots
- Clade: Asterids
- Order: Gentianales
- Family: Rubiaceae
- Genus: Gallienia; Dubard & Dop
- Species: G. sclerophylla

Binomial name
- Gallienia sclerophylla Dubard & Dop

Genus of plants

Gallienia is a monotypic genus of flowering plants in the family Rubiaceae. The genus contains only one species, viz. Gallienia sclerophylla, which is endemic to Madagascar.
