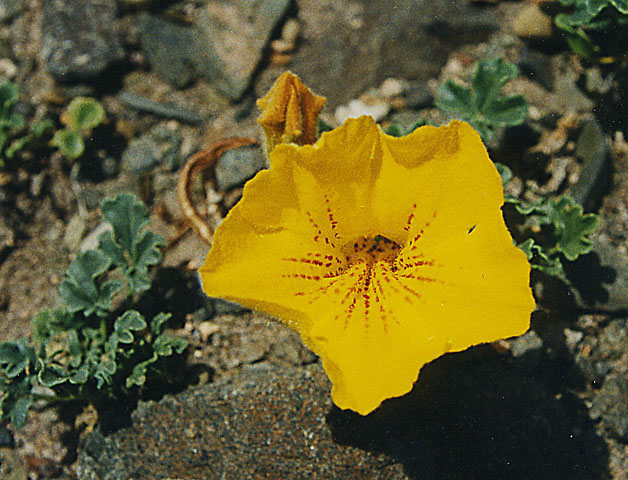

Scientific classification
- Kingdom: Plantae
- Clade: Tracheophytes
- Clade: Angiosperms
- Clade: Eudicots
- Clade: Asterids
- Order: Lamiales
- Family: Bignoniaceae
- Genus: Argylia
- Species: A. uspallatensis

Binomial name
- Argylia uspallatensis DC.

Synonyms
- Argylia trifoliata DC.; Tecoma uspallatensis Mart. ex DC. nom. inval.

= Argylia uspallatensis =

Species of flowering plant

Argylia uspallatensis is a species of perennial plant in the family Bignoniaceae. It is found in Chile and Argentina.
