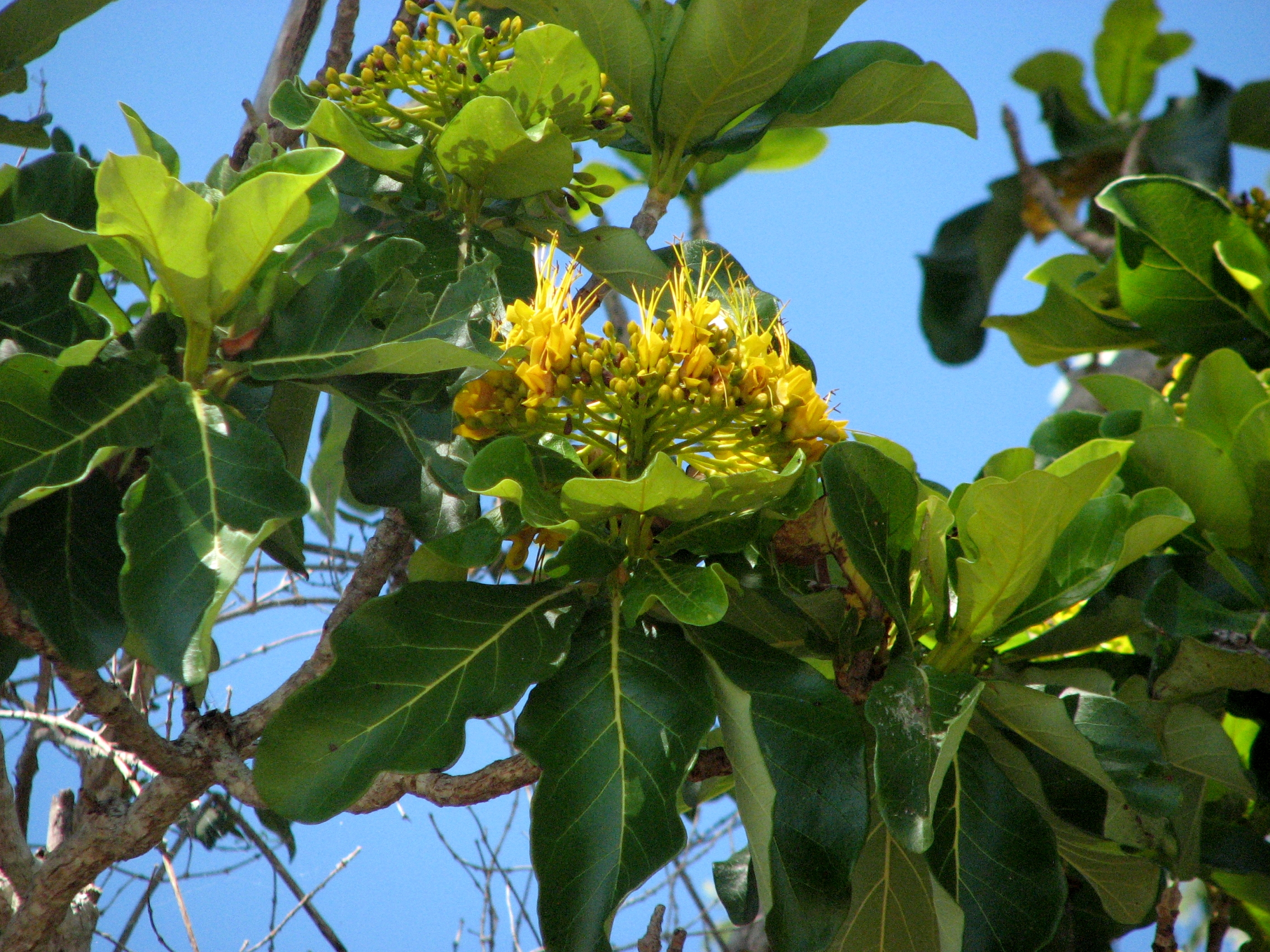

Scientific classification
- Kingdom: Plantae
- Clade: Embryophytes
- Clade: Tracheophytes
- Clade: Spermatophytes
- Clade: Angiosperms
- Clade: Eudicots
- Clade: Asterids
- Order: Lamiales
- Family: Bignoniaceae
- Genus: Deplanchea
- Species: D. tetraphylla

Binomial name
- Deplanchea tetraphylla (R.Br.) F.Muell.

Synonyms
- Bulweria nobilissima F.Muell.; Deplanchea bulwerii (F.Muell.) F.Muell.; Diplanthera tetraphylla R.Br.; Faradaya chrysoclada K.Schum.; Tecomella bulweri F.Muell. nom. inval.

= Deplanchea tetraphylla =

Species of flowering plant

Deplanchea tetraphylla is a species of tropical rainforest tree, commonly known as golden bouquet tree, wallaby wireless tree or yellow pagoda flower tree, constituting part of the plant family Bignoniaceae.

It grows naturally in New Guinea, Aru Islands, Cape York Peninsula and the Wet Tropics of Queensland in north eastern Australia.

Atop the branches, mature trees have spectacular large bouquets of many yellow flowers, hence popularly planted in wet–tropical Australian horticulture.
