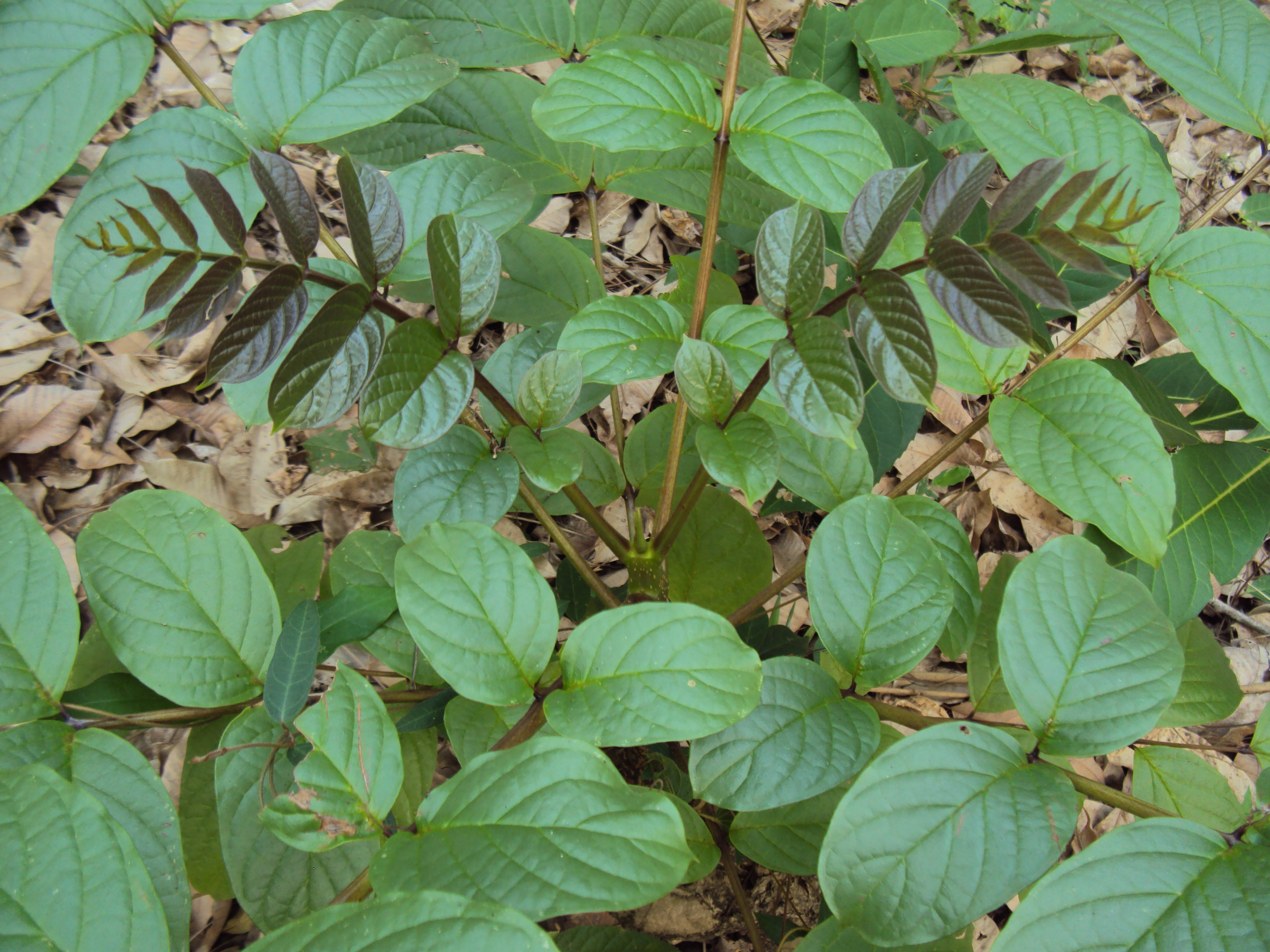
- Demonstrating significant shoot apical meristem proliferation

Conservation status
- Least Concern (IUCN 3.1)

Scientific classification
- Kingdom: Plantae
- Clade: Tracheophytes
- Clade: Angiosperms
- Clade: Eudicots
- Clade: Asterids
- Order: Lamiales
- Family: Bignoniaceae
- Tribe: Tecomeae
- Genus: Pajanelia; DC.
- Species: P. longifolia

Binomial name
- Pajanelia longifolia (Willd.) K.Schum.

Synonyms
- Bignonia longifolia Willd.; Bignonia indica Lour., nom. illeg.; Bignonia macrostachya Wall.; Bignonia multijuga Wall.; Bignonia pajanelia Buch.; Pajanelia multijuga Wall.; Pajanelia rheedii Wight.; Bignonia tongifolia Willd., orth. var.

= Pajanelia =

Genus of flowering plants

Pajanelia, sometimes known in English as tender wild jack or pajanelia, in Malayalam as azhantha or pajneli, in Kannada as alangi and in Tamil as aranthal, is a monotypic genus of evergreen or briefly deciduous flowering tree in the family Bignoniaceae which contains a single species, Pajanelia longifolia.

It can be most commonly found within the deciduous and semi-evergreen mountainous rainforests of India, Sri Lanka, Myanmar, Thailand, Peninsular Malaysia and the islands of Sumatra, Natuna, and Borneo. It is often spotted alongside rivers or within forests adjacent to the coastand up to 1000m above sea level, and is occasionally found lonesome in the plains.

== Etymology ==
The genus epithet Pajanelia stems from a Malayalam name for the plant, pajaneli, recorded from Dutch Malabar in the 1670s (see Hortus Malabaricus the 37th plant in Volume 1). The species epithet longifolia is of Latin origin and means long leaves.

== Description ==
Pajanelia grows as a small to medium sized tree up to 30 metres (98.4 feet) tall, it has an upright habit and few side branches. The trunk is occasionally buttressed and up to 115 cm (45 in) in diameter. The heartwood is white-brown coloured, and the pale grey outer bark is scaly and linearly lenticellate.

Its leaves are compound, ovate and chartaceous, they are imparipinnate and glabrous with 7-17 leaflets. They may be up to 120 cm (47 in) long, with the apex being acuminate. The rachis is triangular and glabrous. The petiolule is 0.6 cm (0.24 in) long and the midrib is flat or slightly canaliculate. The tertiary nerves are broadly reticulate.

=== Flower and fruit ===
Between January and June inflorescent panicles of purple flowers with yellow interiors are produced. They are silken along their margins and smell of soap. The flowers bloom at night before fading at dawn.

The brown, compressed and glabrous fruit is of capsule shape, 30–45 cm (12–18 in) long and 5–7.5 cm (2.0–3.0 in) wide. It is winged on both margins. The seeds are housed within two valves and are flat, chartaceous and winged on both sides.

== Uses ==
Pajanelia is used in parts of Malaysia, where it is commonly planted as stakes for hedges along rice fields, and is also planted as support tree in pepper plantations. The timber is suitable for woodworking purposes, such as building doors, wall panelling, domestic flooring, veneer and plywood, due to it being very hard and close grained. In conjunction with this, the wood has been used by the native Andamanese for house building, planking and canoe building; people in Natuna Islands also use the wood to build boats. Pajanelia also has uses within traditional south Asian medicine. According to the 17th Century Hortus Malabaricus, its crushed roots have been used in Kerala, India to cure headache, swelling and inflammation. It may be resistant to white ant attacks, and is pollinated by various species of bats.

== Gallery ==
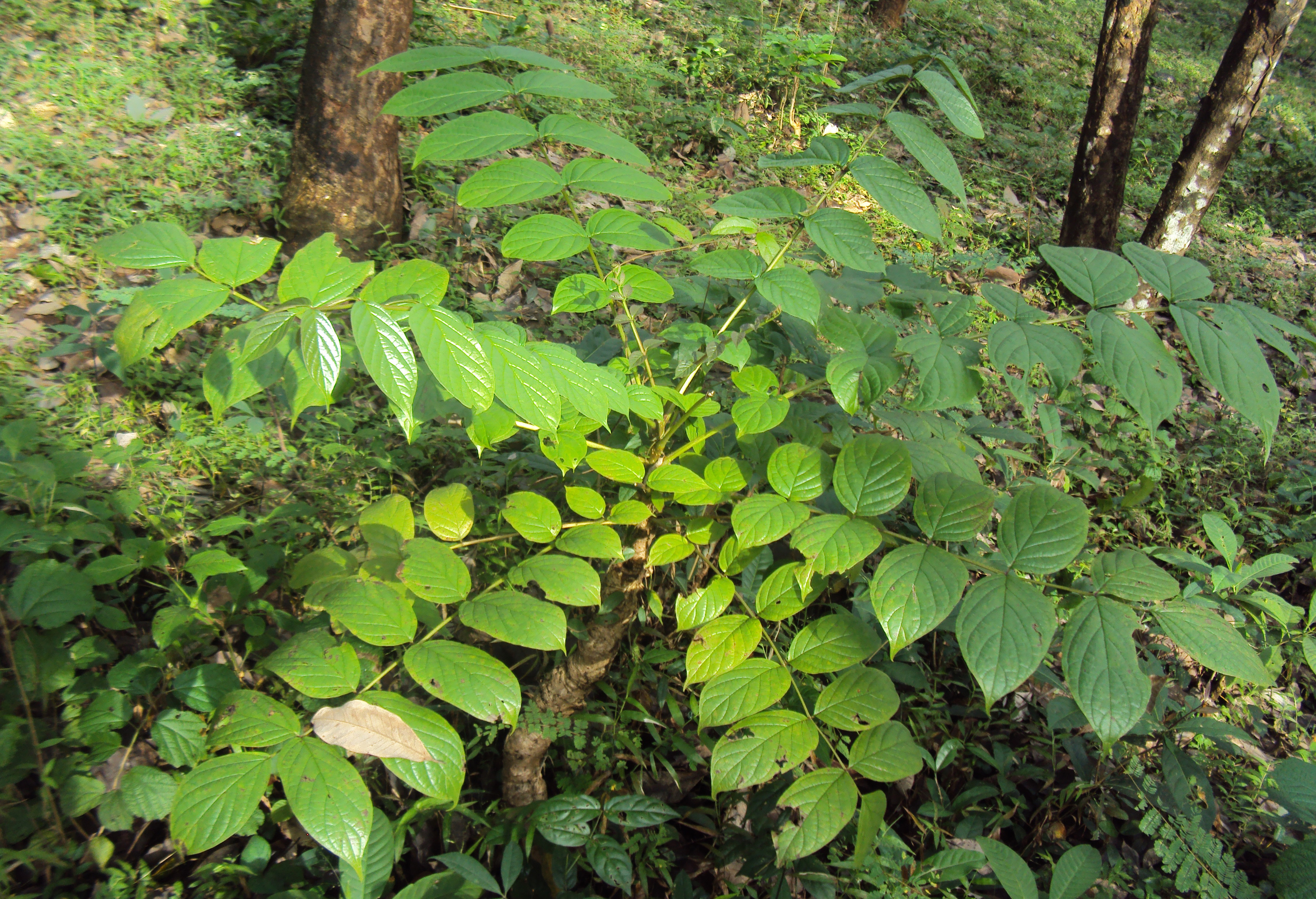
Leaf structure

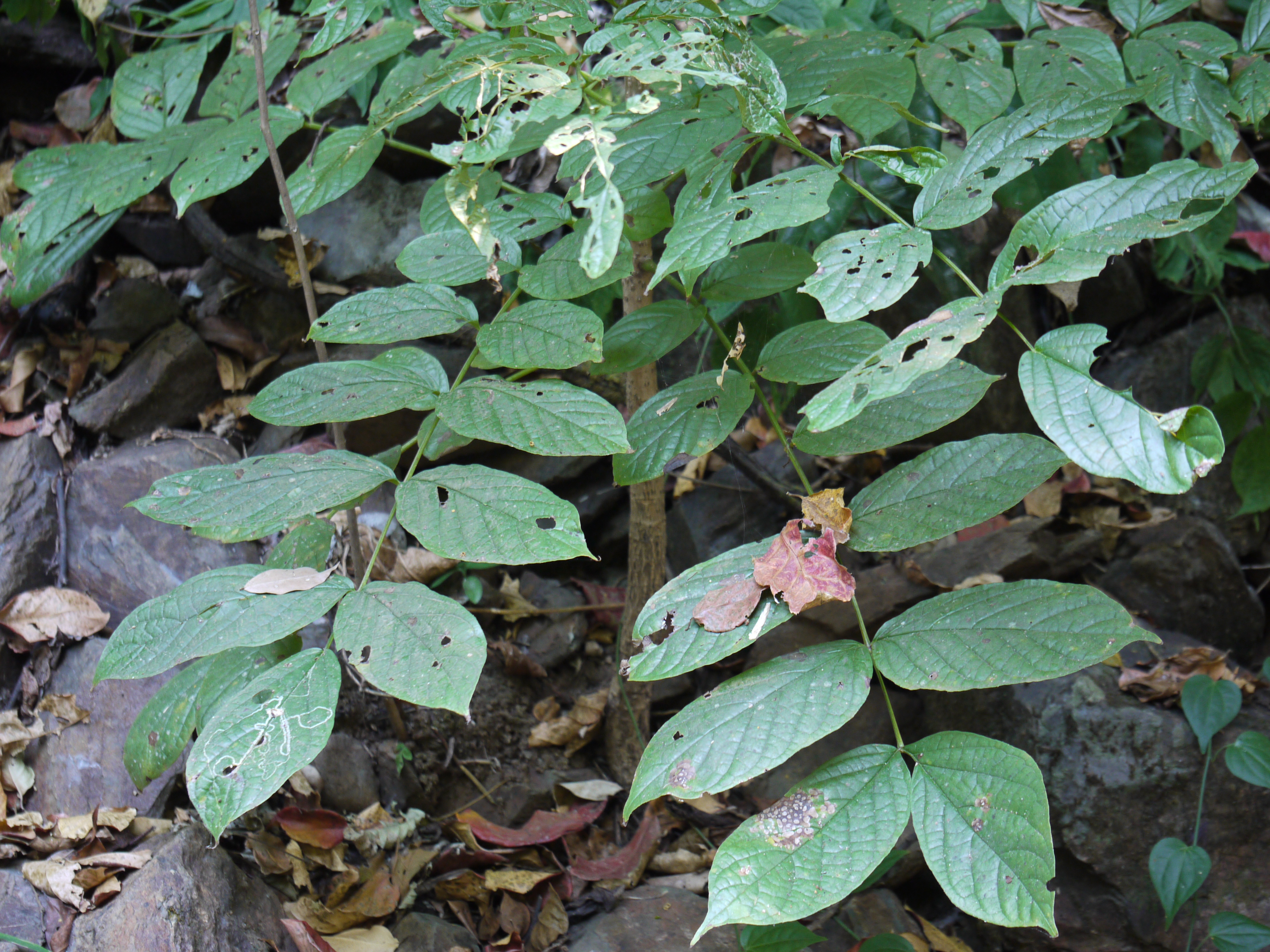
Leaf structure

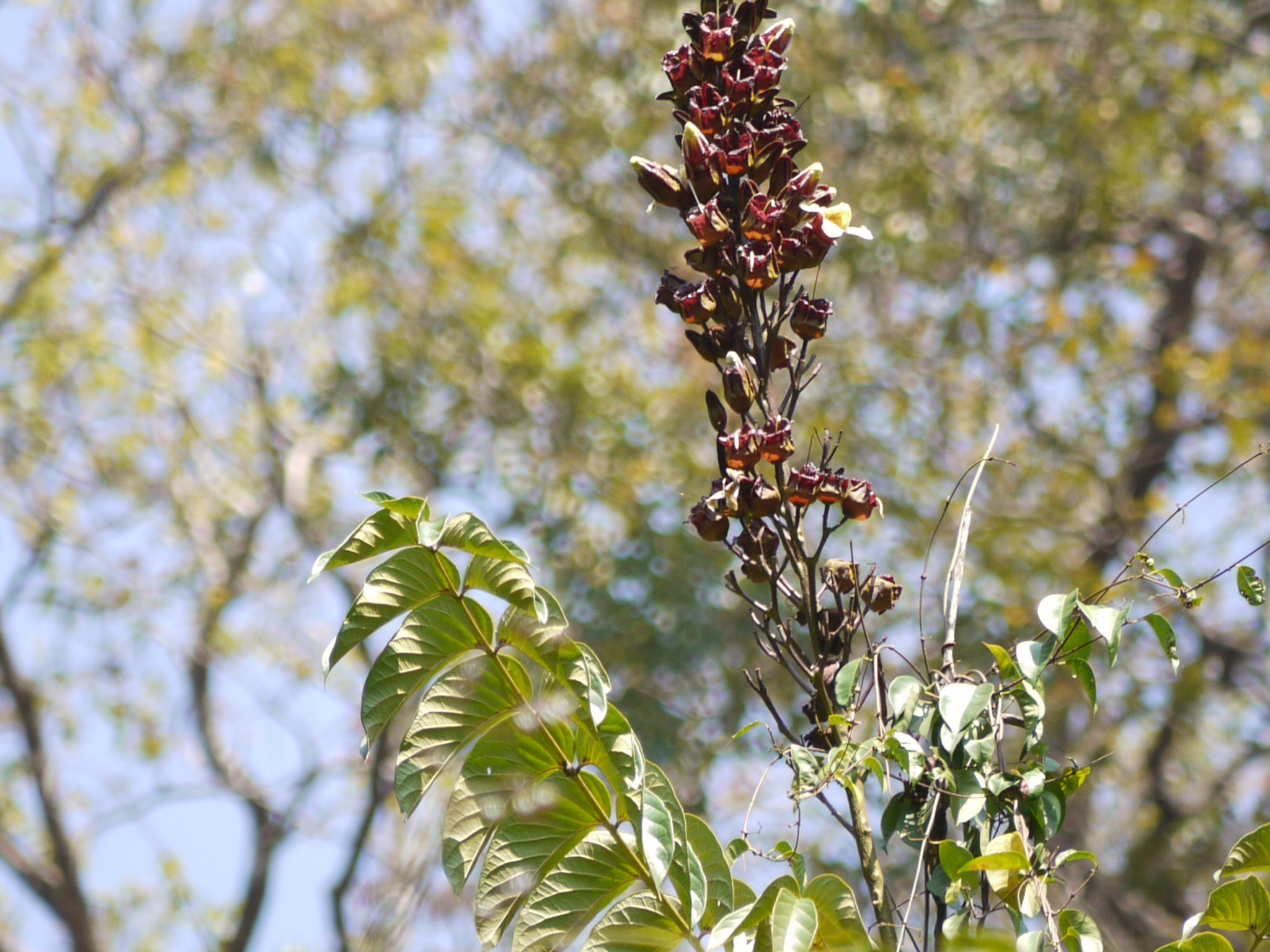
Flower panicle

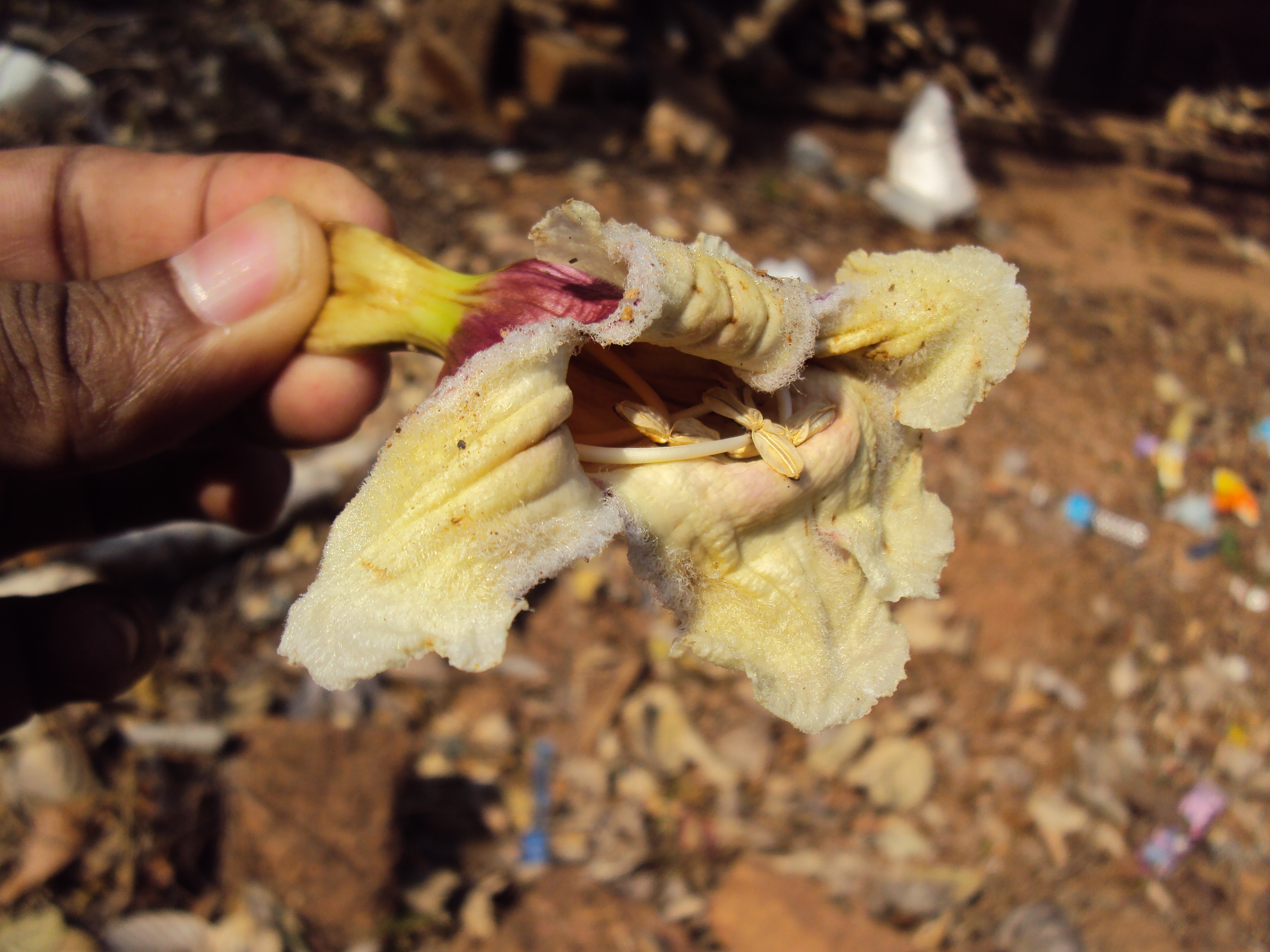
Close-up of flower

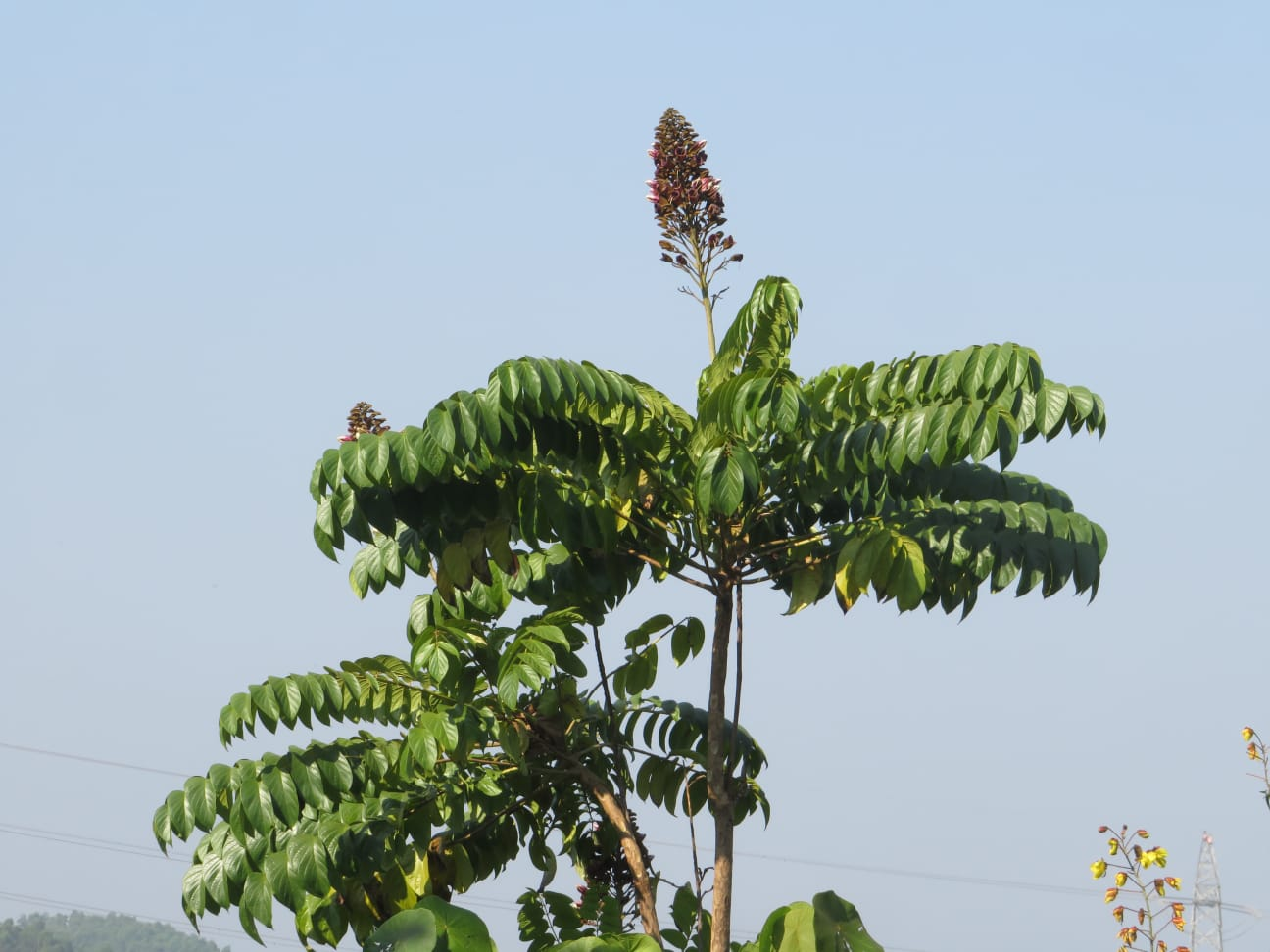
In full bloom

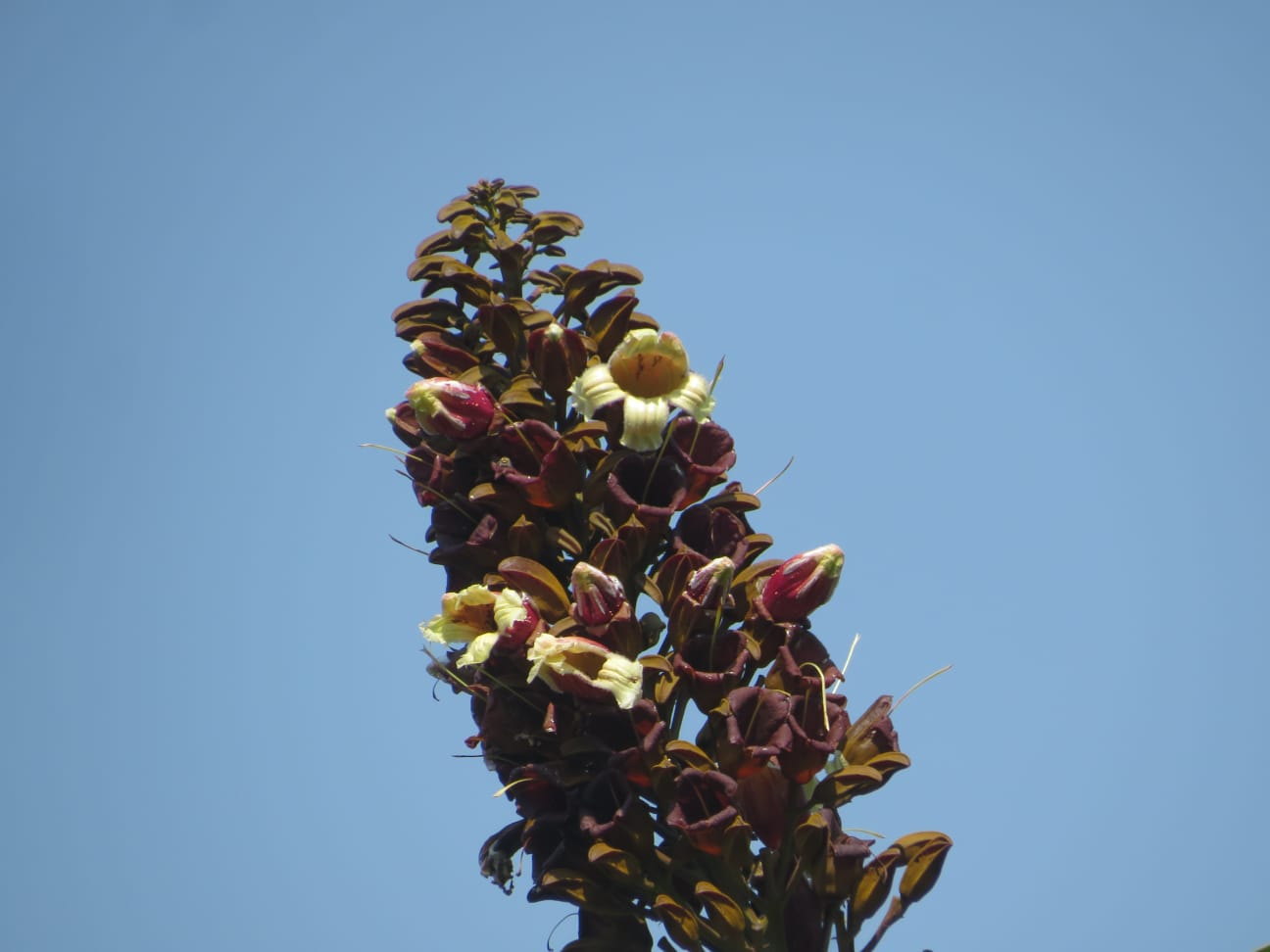
Close up of the flower panicle
