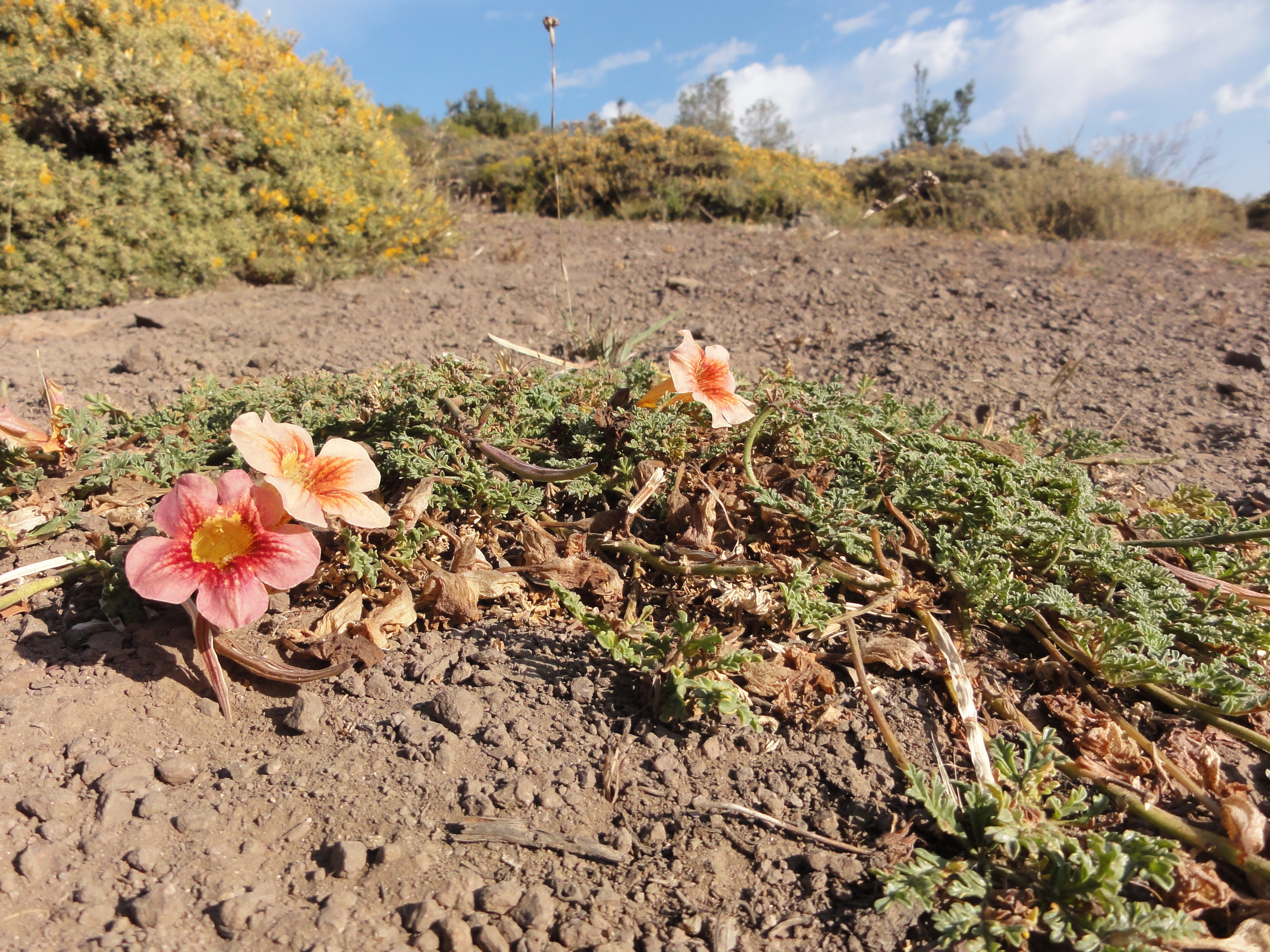

Scientific classification
- Kingdom: Plantae
- Clade: Tracheophytes
- Clade: Angiosperms
- Clade: Eudicots
- Clade: Asterids
- Order: Lamiales
- Family: Bignoniaceae
- Genus: Argylia
- Species: A. adscendens

Binomial name
- Argylia adscendens DC.

= Argylia adscendens =

Species of flowering plant

Argylia adscendens is a species of perennial plant in the family Bignoniaceae. It is found in Chile.
