= Deplanchea bancana =

Conservation status
- Least Concern (IUCN 3.1)

Scientific classification
- Kingdom: Plantae
- Clade: Embryophytes
- Clade: Tracheophytes
- Clade: Angiosperms
- Clade: Eudicots
- Clade: Asterids
- Order: Lamiales
- Family: Bignoniaceae
- Genus: Deplanchea
- Species: D. bancana

Binomial name
- Deplanchea bancana (Scheff.) Steenis

Synonyms
- Diplanthera bancana Scheff.

Species of tree

Deplanchea bancana is a tree in the family Bignoniaceae. It is named for Sumatra's Bangka Island.

== Description ==
Deplanchea bancana grows up to 45 metres (150 ft) tall with a trunk diameter of up to 70 centimetres (28 in). The fissured bark is white to brown. The flowers are yellow and 5-lobed. The fruits are oblong and measure up to 14 cm (6 in) long.

== Distribution and habitat ==
Deplanchea bancana grows naturally in Sumatra, Peninsular Malaysia and Borneo. Its habitat is lowland forests from sea-level to 1,000 metres (3,300 ft) altitude.
