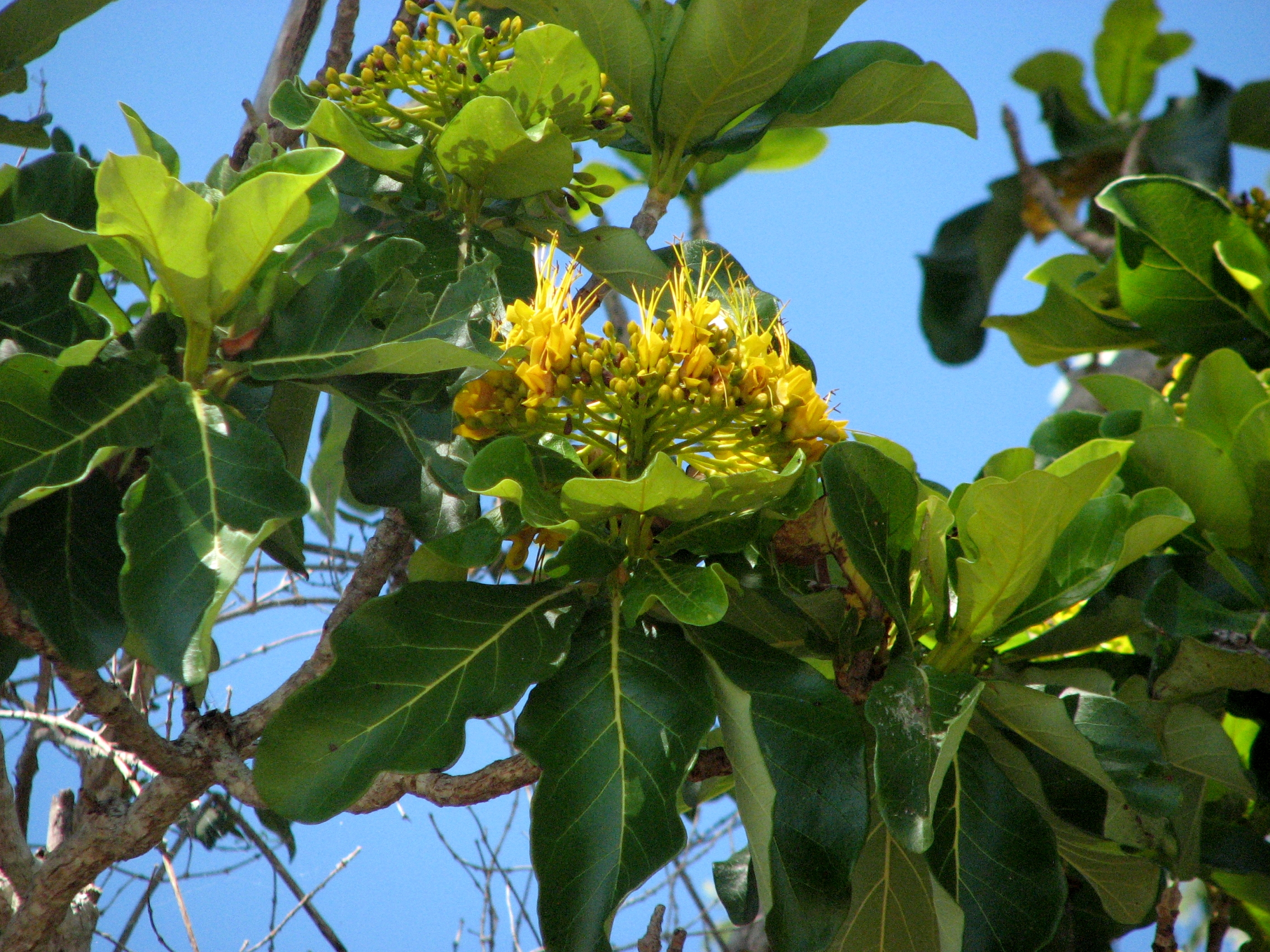
- Deplanchea tetraphylla

Scientific classification
- Kingdom: Plantae
- Clade: Tracheophytes
- Clade: Angiosperms
- Clade: Eudicots
- Clade: Asterids
- Order: Lamiales
- Family: Bignoniaceae
- Tribe: Tecomeae
- Genus: Deplanchea; Vieill.

Type species
- Deplanchea speciosa Vieill.

Species
- See text

= Deplanchea =

Genus of flowering plants

Deplanchea is a genus of about eight species of tropical rainforest trees, constituting part of the plant family Bignoniaceae.

They grow naturally in New Guinea, New Caledonia, Borneo, Sumatra, Malay Peninsula, central Sulawesi and north eastern Australia.

== Species ==
As of April 2014 The Plant List recognises 8 accepted species:

- Deplanchea bancana (Sheffer) Steenis – Sumatra, Borneo, Malay Peninsula, Riau Archipelago, Bangka Island, Belitung
- Deplanchea coriacea Steenis
- Deplanchea glabra (Steenis) Steenis – New Guinea, C. Sulawesi, E. Borneo
- Deplanchea hirsuta (F.M.Bailey) Steenis
- Deplanchea montana (Vieill. ex Beauvis.) Guillaumin
- Deplanchea sessilifolia Vieill. ex Steenis – New Caledonia endemic
- Deplanchea speciosa Vieill. – New Caledonia endemic
- Deplanchea tetraphylla (R.Br.) F.Muell. – New Guinea, Aru Islands, north eastern Queensland and Cape York Peninsula, Australia
