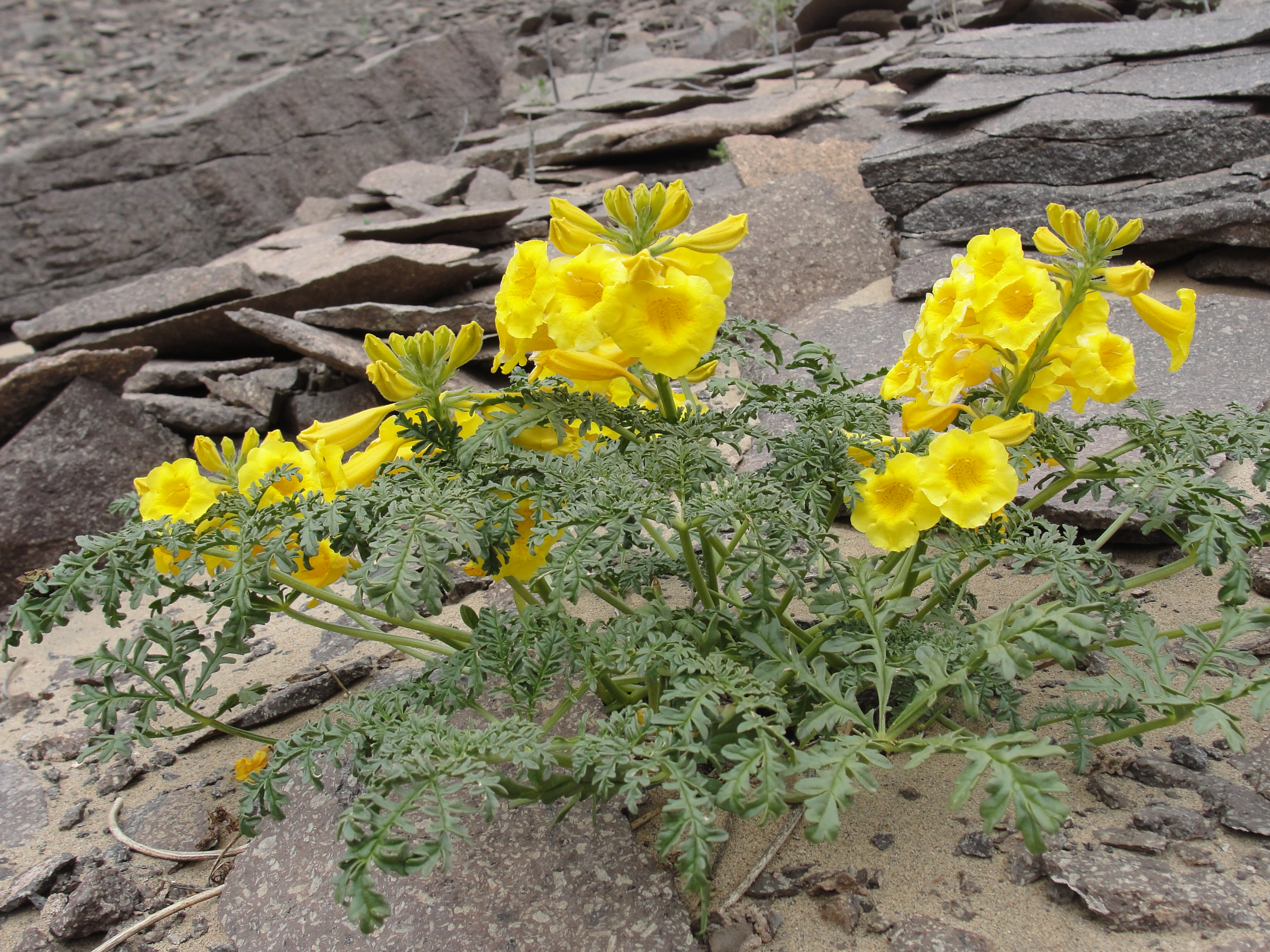

Scientific classification
- Kingdom: Plantae
- Clade: Tracheophytes
- Clade: Angiosperms
- Clade: Eudicots
- Clade: Asterids
- Order: Lamiales
- Family: Bignoniaceae
- Genus: Argylia
- Species: A. radiata

Binomial name
- Argylia radiata (L.) D. Don 1823

Synonyms
- Argylia canescens D.Don; Argylia chrysantha Phil.; Argylia digitalina Phil.; Argylia eremophila Phil.; Argylia feuillei DC.; Argylia glabriuscula Phil.; Argylia puberula DC.; Argylia tenuifolia C.Presl; Argylia villosa Phil.; Bignonia radiata L.; Oxymitus argylioides C.Presl

= Argylia radiata =

Species of flowering plant

Argylia radiata is a species of perennial plant in the family Bignoniaceae. It is found in Brazil, Chile, and Peru.
