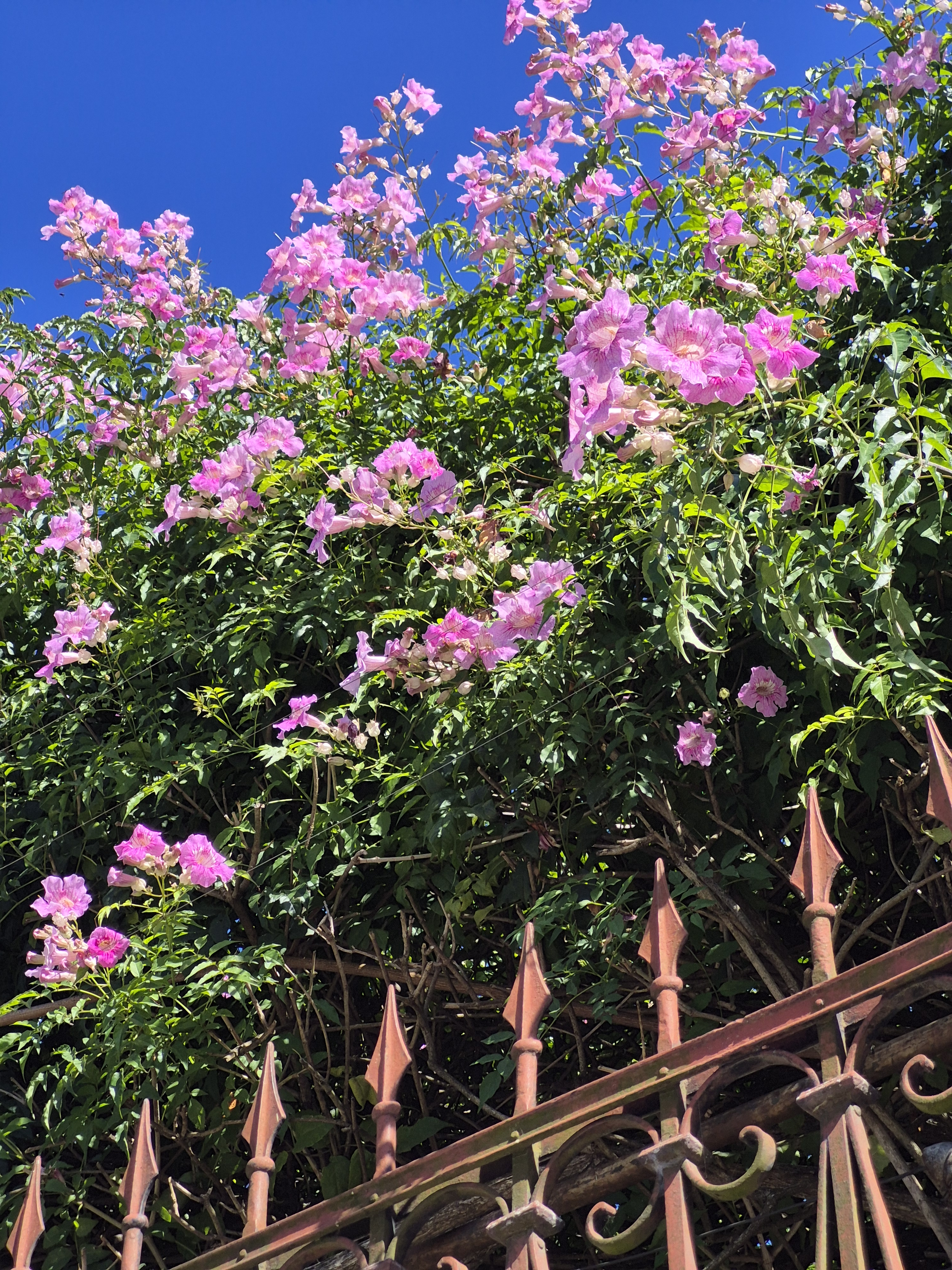
- Habit in Brazil
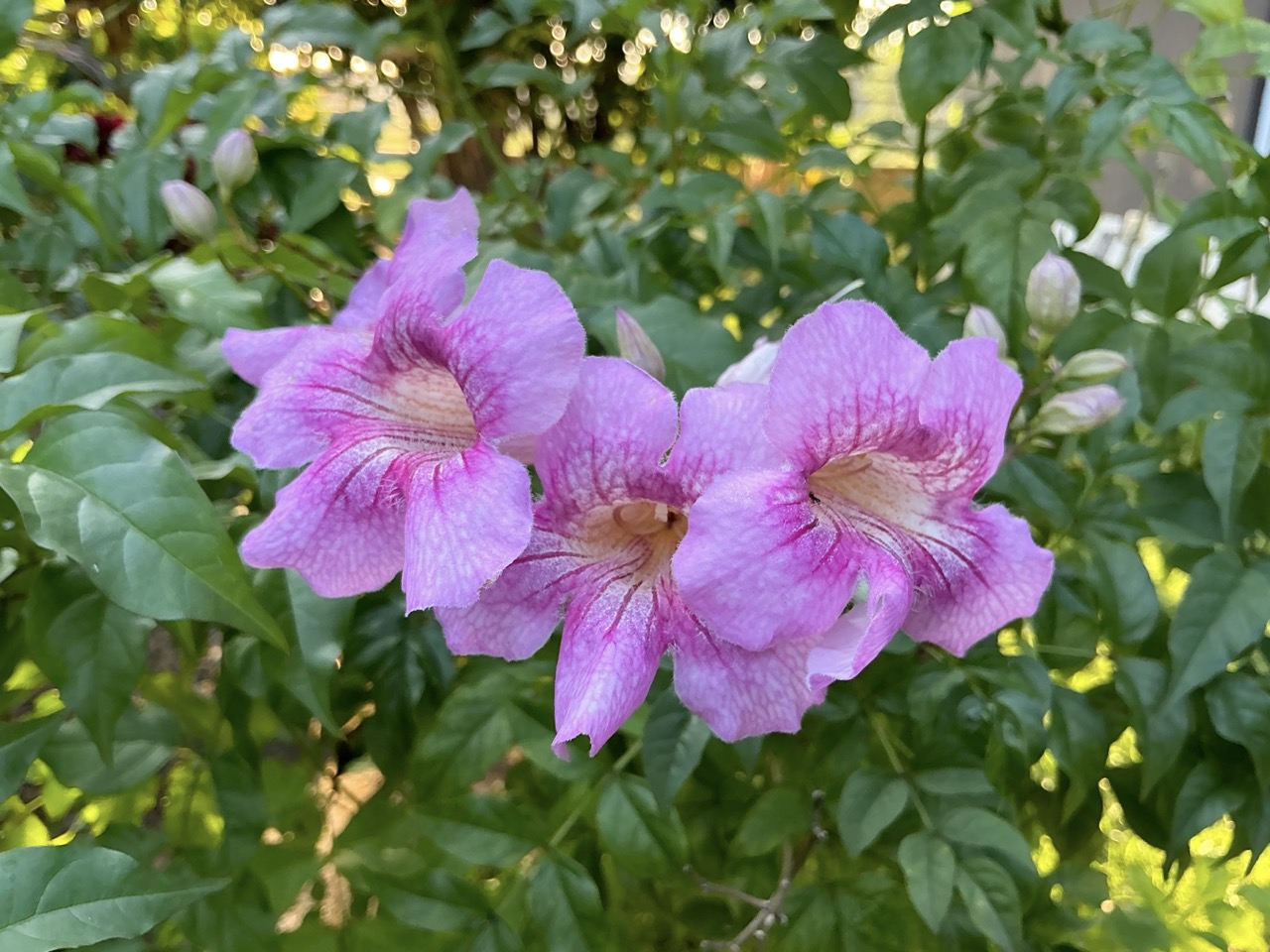
- Flowers and foliage

Scientific classification
- Kingdom: Plantae
- Clade: Embryophytes
- Clade: Tracheophytes
- Clade: Spermatophytes
- Clade: Angiosperms
- Clade: Eudicots
- Clade: Asterids
- Order: Lamiales
- Family: Bignoniaceae
- Genus: Podranea
- Species: P. ricasoliana

Binomial name
- Podranea ricasoliana (Tanfani) Sprague

Synonyms
- Pandorea ricasoliana (Tanfani) K.Schum.; Tecoma ricasoliana Tanfani; Tecomaria ricasoliana (Tanfani) Kraenzl.

= Podranea ricasoliana =

Species of flowering plant

Podranea ricasoliana, called the pink trumpet vine, is a species of flowering plant in the genus Podranea, native to South Africa, Malawi, Mozambique and Zambia. It has gained the Royal Horticultural Society's Award of Garden Merit.

== Description ==
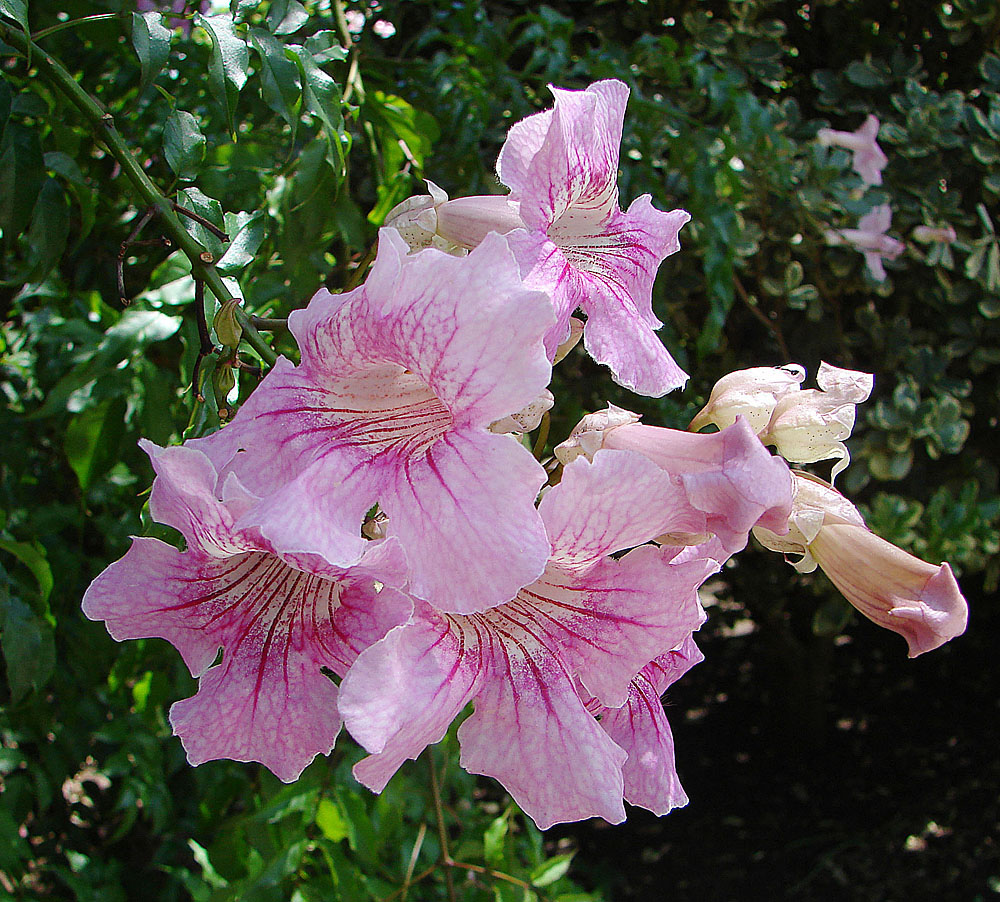
Pink trumpet vine flowers

The pink trumpet vine grows as an evergreen, vining shrub with woody and twining stems, lacking tendrils, that can reach a height of 5 m (16 ft). The up to 25 cm (9.8 in) long, opposite leaves are imparipinnate and composed of 5 to 13 ovate, lanceolate-ovate to broadly oblong-elliptic, pointed leaflets, 2-7 x 1-3 cm or somewhat larger on new shoots.

The leaves are dark green, with a somewhat toothed margin, a cuneate base, often somewhat asymmetrical, and a short to long acuminate apex. Petiole is 0.8–1 cm (0.31–0.39 in) long.

=== Inflorescence ===
The pink flowers have reddish stripes in the center, veined darker in the throat, are in terminal panicles, are bell-shaped, five-lobed (while slightly two-lipped), fragrant and reach a size of up to 7.5 × 7.5 cm. The corolla tube has two long and two short stamens. The calyx is broad bell-shaped, light colored, 1.5–2 cm (0.59–0.79 in) centimeters long, divided halfway with five pointed teeth. The corolla is 6–8 inches (15–20 cm) tall and wide with a spreading five-slip hem and is pale pink to yellow-white, with pinkish-red stripes and spots on the inside and widens bell-shaped from the narrow base. The flowers appear from summer to early autumn.

The fruits are up to 40 cm long, cylindrical capsules that open bivalvely at maturity, releasing numerous winged seeds.

== Distribution ==
The home of the pink trumpet vine is in South Africa; there the species is endemic in the Port St. Johns area (between East London and Durban) at the mouth of the Mzimvubu River (but there are also suspicions that the species originally came from East Africa).

Today, it has been introduced in Morocco, Spain, the Canary Islands, Saint Helena, Hawaii, Bolivia, Central America, Mexico and many Caribbean islands.

== Weed potential ==
The species is considered to be a weed in Australia, New Zealand, and Hawaii. Its vigorous habit and dense masses of foliage and branches tend to smother surrounding vegetation. The plant can withstand temperatures down to −5 °C (23 °F).

== Gallery ==
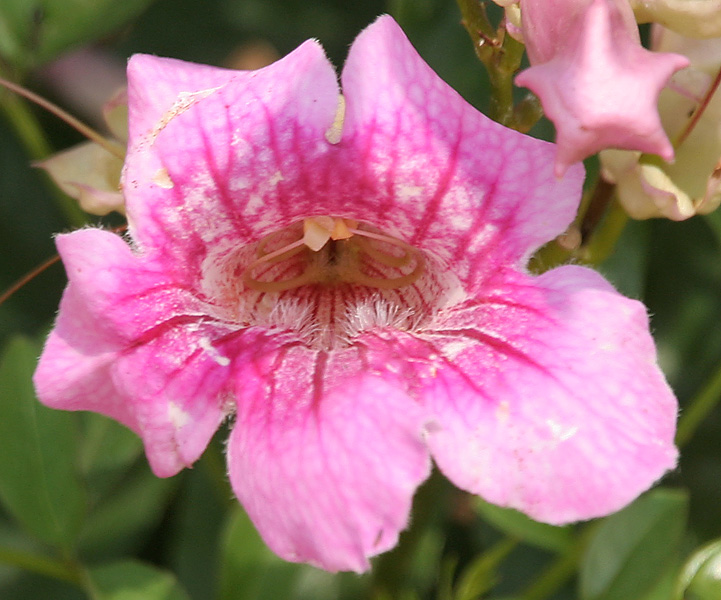
Close-up of flower

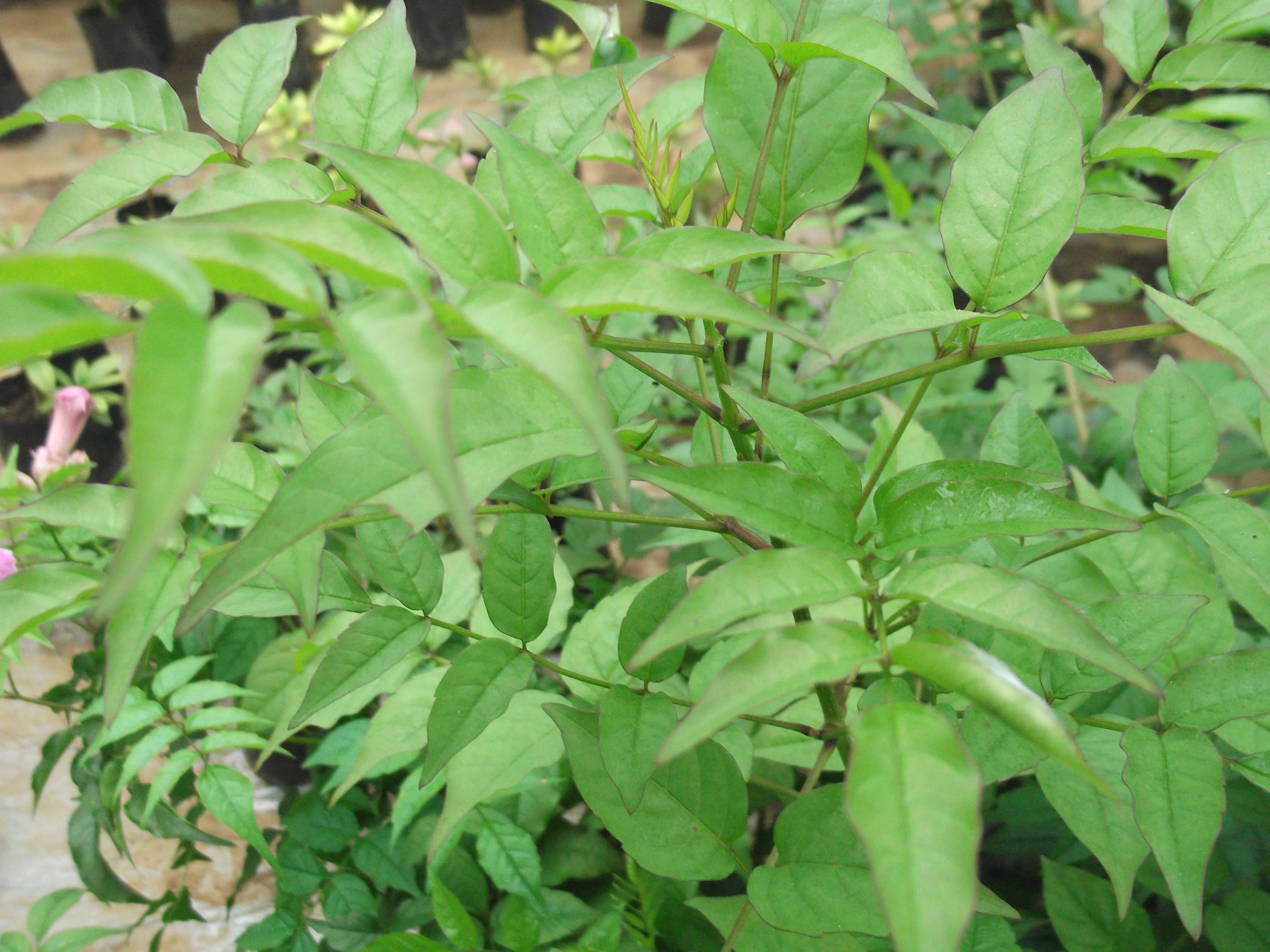
Leaves

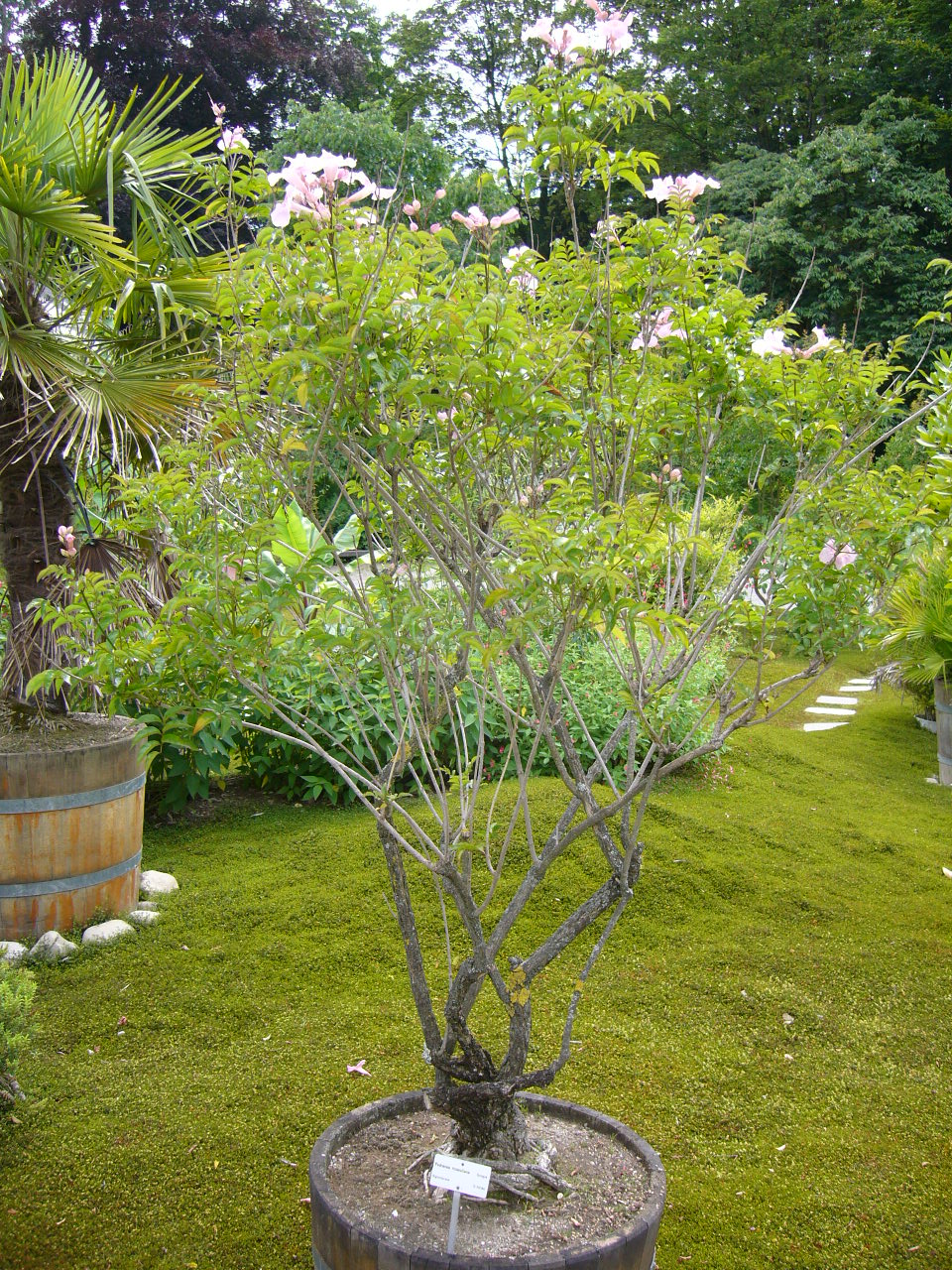
Trained as a shrub

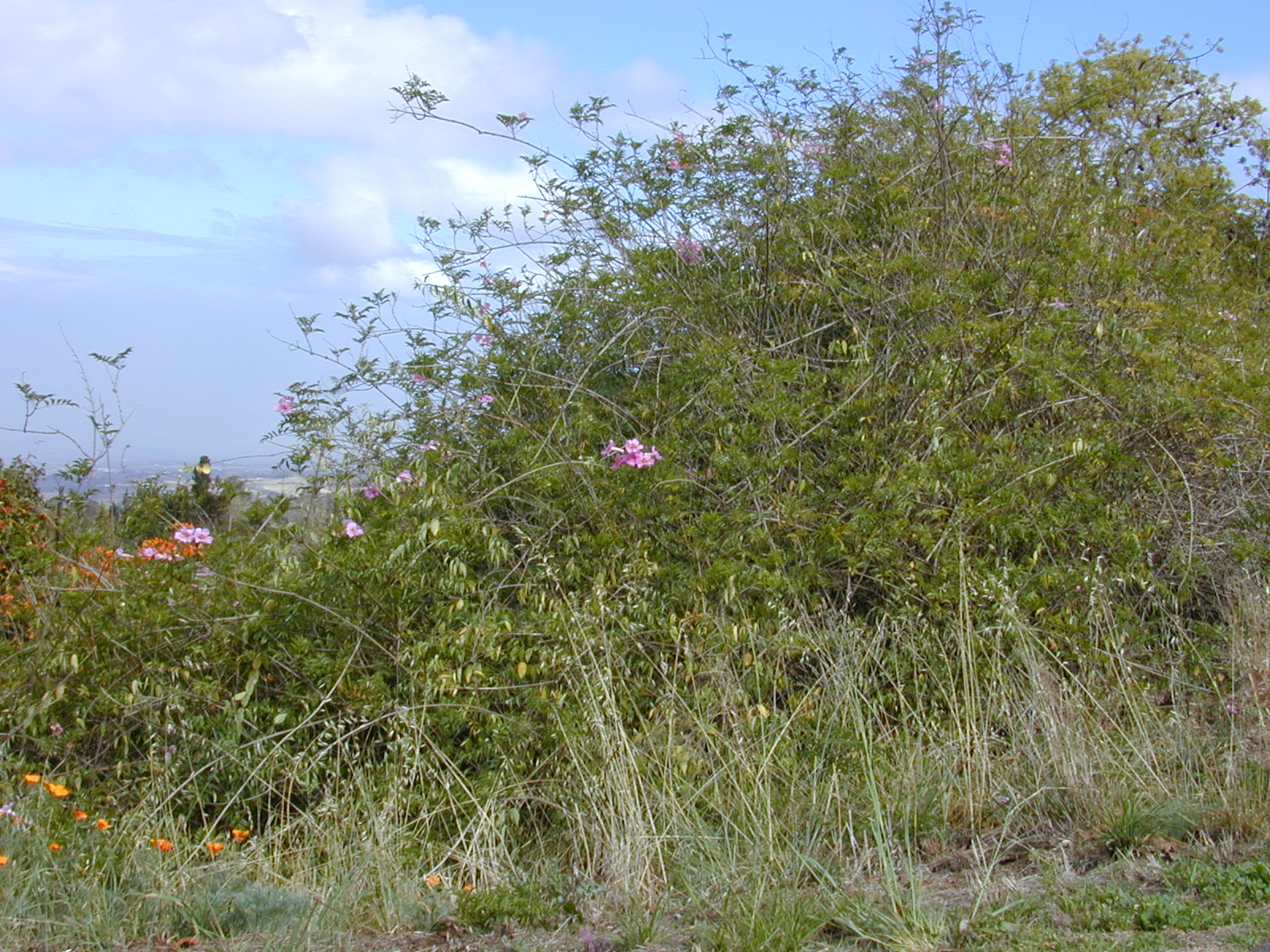
Overgrowth in Hawaii

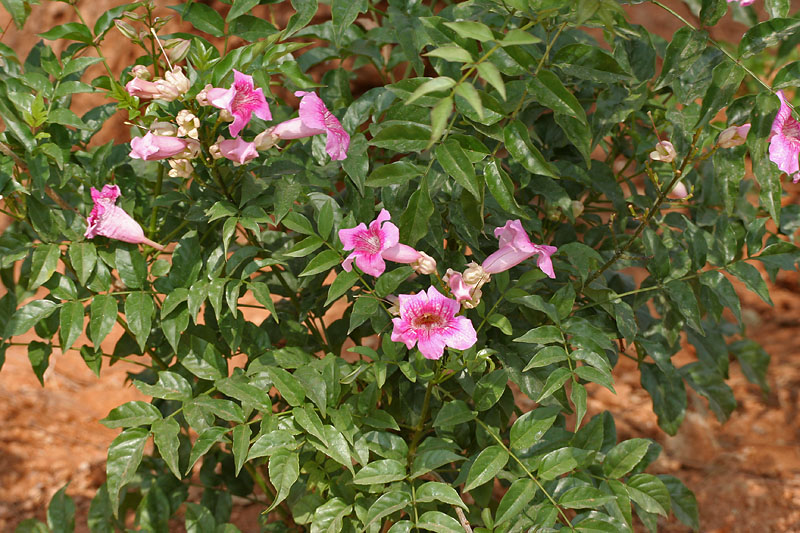
In Hyderabad, India

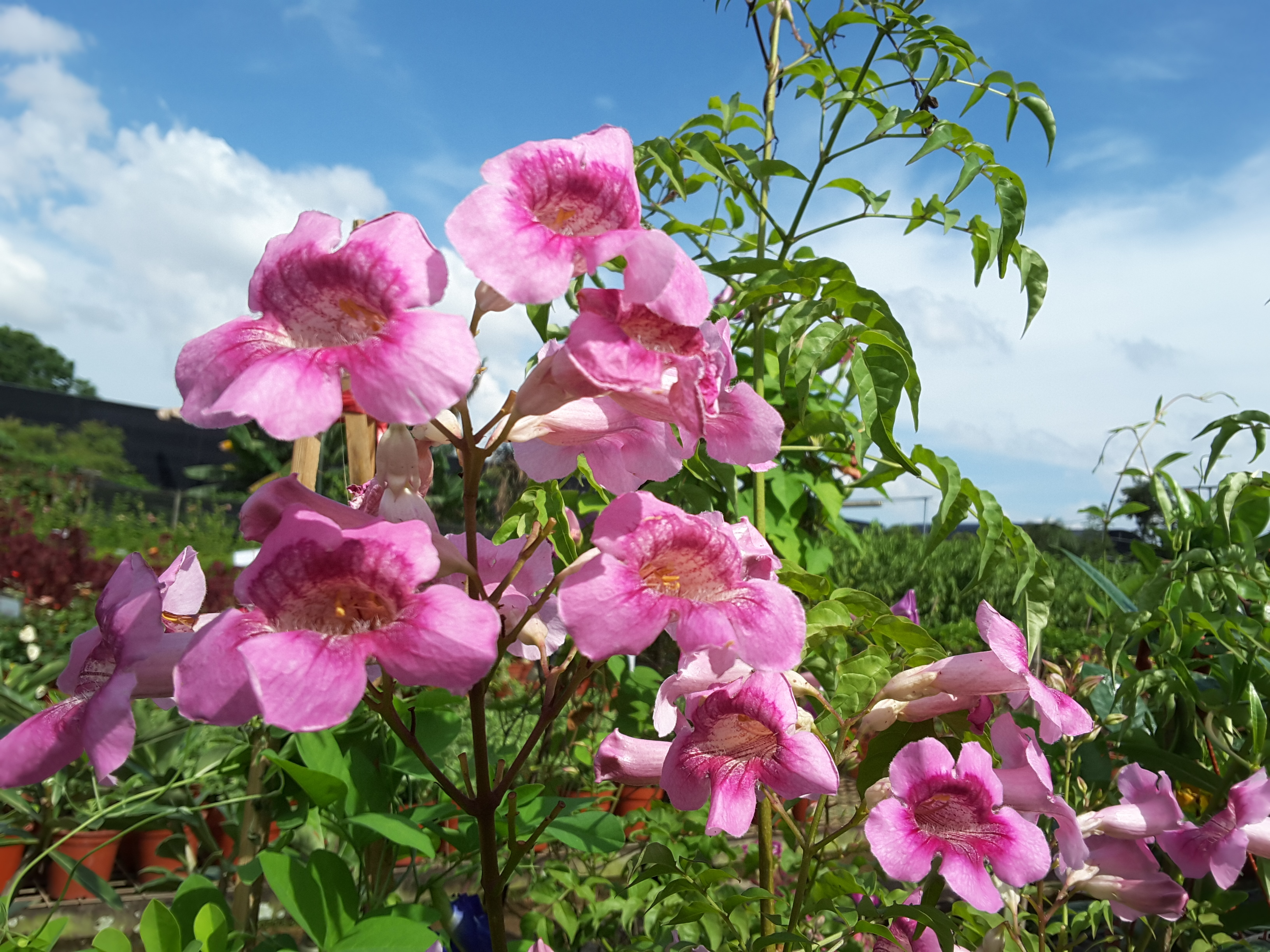
In a shrubland

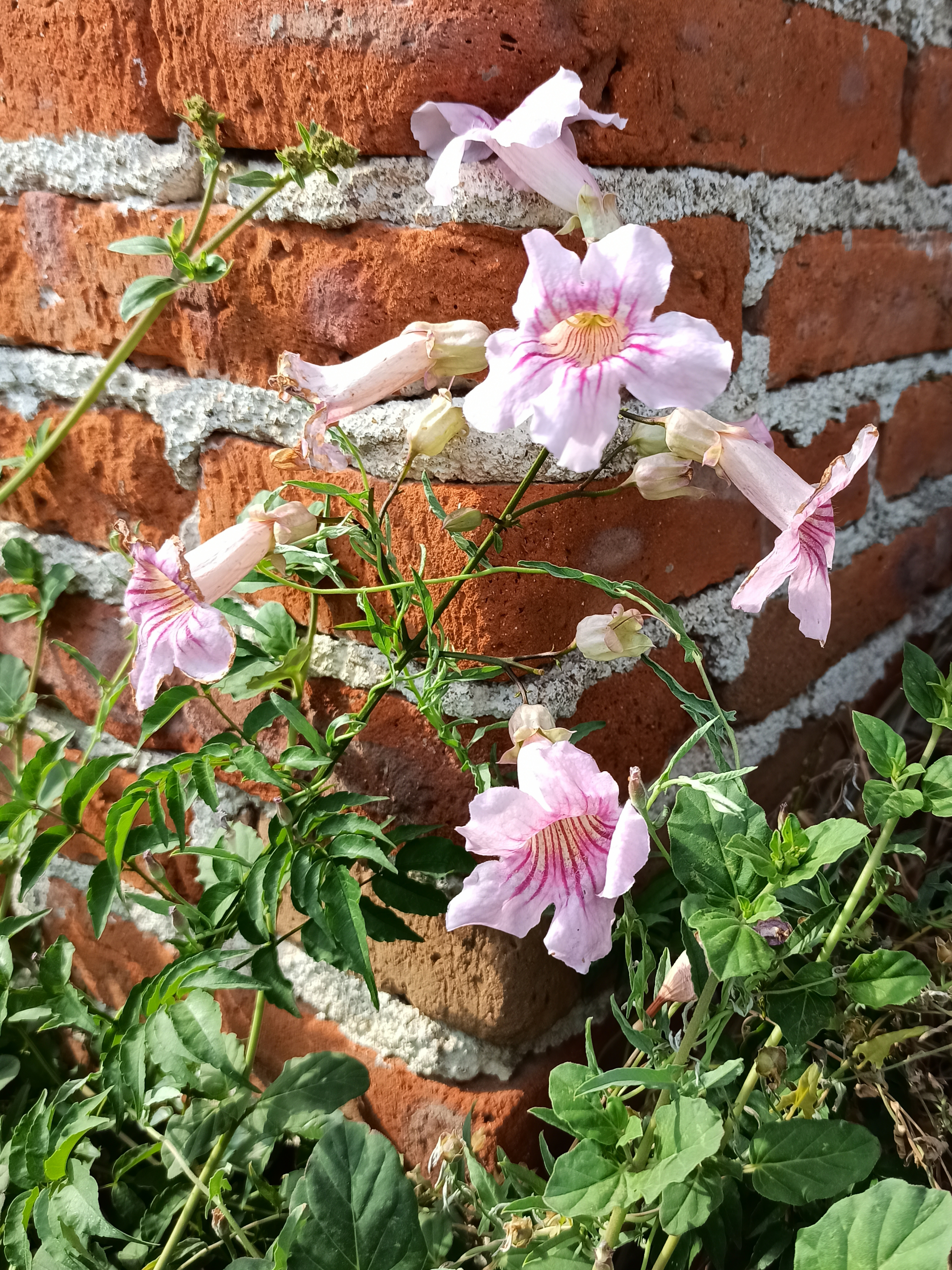
Climbing a wall
