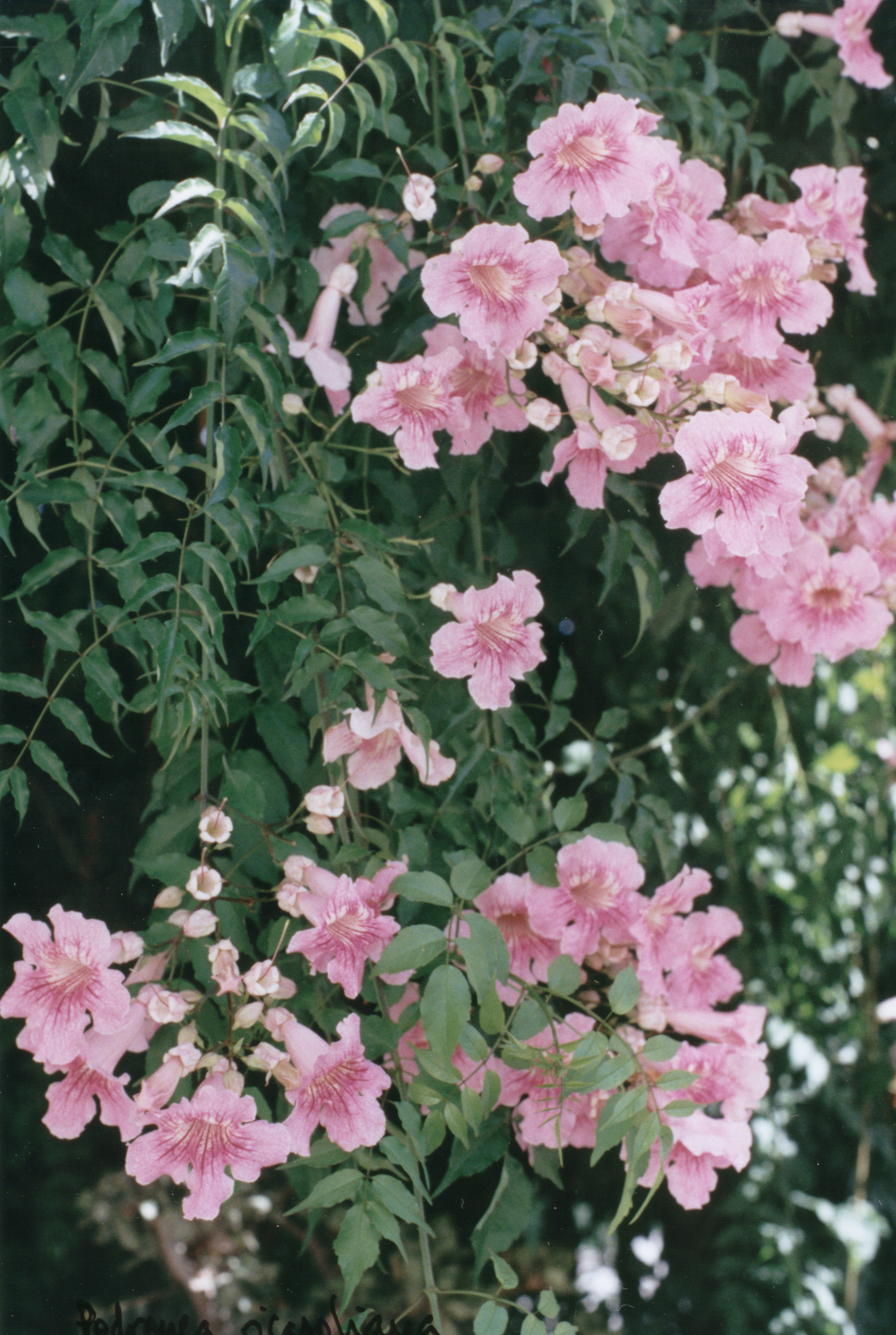

Scientific classification
- Kingdom: Plantae
- Clade: Embryophytes
- Clade: Tracheophytes
- Clade: Spermatophytes
- Clade: Angiosperms
- Clade: Eudicots
- Clade: Asterids
- Order: Lamiales
- Family: Bignoniaceae
- Tribe: Tecomeae
- Genus: Podranea; Sprague

Species
- See text

= Podranea =

Genus of flowering plants

Podranea is a genus of one or two species of African flowering vines in the family Bignoniaceae.

The native range of this genus is southern tropical Africa and southern Africa. It is found in Malawi, Mozambique, Zambia, Zimbabwe and also the Cape Provinces and KwaZulu-Natal in South Africa.

The genus name of Podranea is derived from anagram of Pandorea. As the genus was separated out from the other Bignoniaceae genus.

The genus was circumscribed by Thomas Archibald Sprague in Fl. Cap. (Harvey) vol.4 (2.3) on page 449 in 1904.

== Species ==
Podranea brycei is sometimes considered to be a synonym of Podranea ricasoliana, one of the two species in the genus. The Plant List accepts two species:

Image	Name	Distribution
	Podranea brycei (N.E.Br.) Sprague (Zimbabwe creeper, or Queen of Sheba)	Africa
	Podranea ricasoliana (Tanfani) Sprague (Port St Johns creeper, Port St Johns klimop, pink trumpet vine)	Africa
