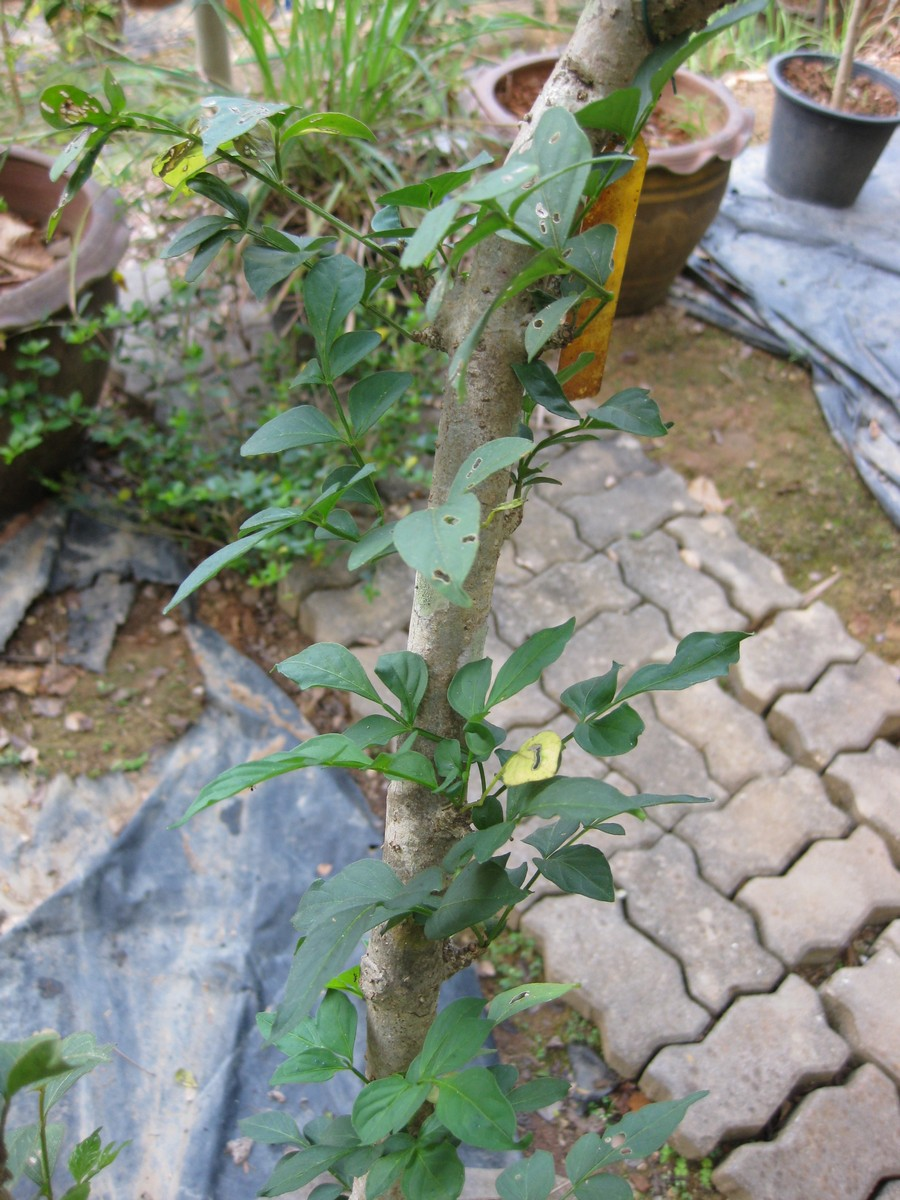
- Pauldopia ghonta, Queen Sirikit Botanic Garden, Chiang Mai Province, Thailand

Scientific classification
- Kingdom: Plantae
- Clade: Tracheophytes
- Clade: Angiosperms
- Clade: Eudicots
- Clade: Asterids
- Order: Lamiales
- Family: Bignoniaceae
- Genus: Pauldopia; Steenis

Synonyms
- Bignonia ghonta Buch.-Ham. ex G.Don; Radermachera alata Dop; Radermachera bipinnata (Collett & Hemsl.) Steenis ex Chatterjee; Radermachera ghonta (Buch.-Ham. ex G.Don) Chatterjee; Stereospermum ghonta (Buch.-Ham. ex G.Don) C.B.Clarke; Tecoma bipinnata Collett & Hemsl.

= Pauldopia =

Species of flowering plant

Pauldopia is a monotypic genus of flowering plants belonging to the family Bignoniaceae. It only contains one known species, Pauldopia ghonta (Buch.-Ham. ex G.Don) Steenis

Its native range is India to Indo-China. It is found in China, India, Laos, Sri Lanka, Thailand and Vietnam.

The genus name of Pauldopia is in honour of Paul Louis Amans Dop (1876–1954), a French botanist who worked extensively in Indo-china. The Latin specific epithet of ghonta is a Bengalis word which means bell, alluding to the corolla shape of the flower. See also Ghanta. Both the genus and the species were first described and published in Acta Bot. Neerl. Vol.18 on page 425-427 in 1969.
