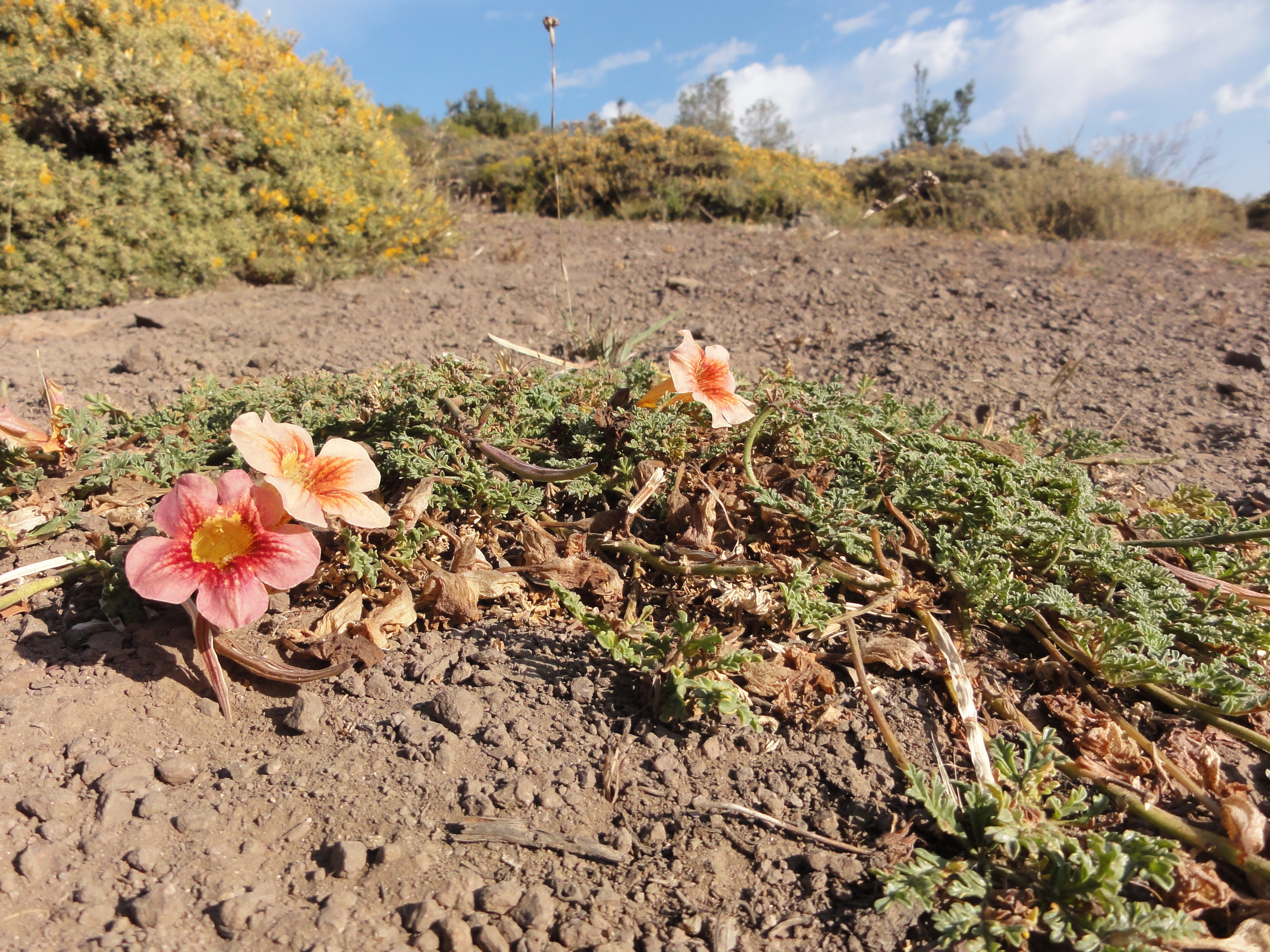
- Argylia adscendens near Santiago, Chile (Feb 8, 2011)

Scientific classification
- Kingdom: Plantae
- Clade: Tracheophytes
- Clade: Angiosperms
- Clade: Eudicots
- Clade: Asterids
- Order: Lamiales
- Family: Bignoniaceae
- Genus: Argylia; DC.

= Argylia =

Genus of flowering plants

Argylia is a genus of flowering plants that is a member of the family Bignoniaceae.

== Species ==
- Argylia adscendens DC.
- Argylia bifrons Phil.
- Argylia bustillosii Phil.
- Argylia checoensis (Meyen) I.M.Johnst.
- Argylia conaiensis Ravenna
- Argylia farnesiana Gleisner & Ricardi Accepted
- Argylia geranioides DC.
- Argylia glutinosa Phil.
- Argylia potentillifolia DC.
- Argylia radiata (L.) D.Don
- Argylia robusta Sandwith
- Argylia tomentosa Phil.
- Argylia uspallatensis DC.
