= Paul Louis Amans Dop =

French botanist (1876–1954)

Paul Louis Amans Dop (Toulouse, 25 February 1876 – Lectoure, 19 August 1954) was a French botanist who worked extensively in Indochina. From 1908 he was associated with the Mascarene botanist Marcel Marie Maurice Dubard, carrying out much taxonomic work under the name of Dubard & Dop.

In 1969, botanist Cornelis Gijsbert Gerrit Jan van Steenis published Pauldopia, a monotypic genus of flowering plants from Indo-China, belonging to the family Bignoniaceae and named in honour of Paul Dop.

== Publications ==
- Flore de la region toulousaine – Cong. Assoc. Franc. Avanc. 39 (Toulouse 1910)
- Étude de quelques types nouveaux ou peu connus de Rubiacées de Madagascar (Extrait du Journal de botanique, t.III, 2e série) – Marcel Dubard, Paul Dop (1911)
- La végétation de l'Indo-Chine – Trav.Lab. For. Toulouse I (Art. 9): 1–16 (1931)
- Les Gmelina arborescents de l'Indochine – Rev. Bot. Appl. 13: 893–897 (1933)
- Manuel de Technique Botanique, Histologie Et Microbie – Paul Dop, Albert Gautié – 1928
- Étude de quelques types nouveaux ou peu connus de – Marcel Dubard, Paul Dop – 1911
- Recherches sur la structure et le développement de la – Paul Dop - 1903
- Un nouveau genre d'Ericacées de l'Annam; La végétation de – Paul Dop – 1931
- Observations sur la végétation littorale du golfe de Gascogne – Paul Dop – 1931
- Sur deux genres nouveaux de Bignoniacées du Tonkin – Paul Dop – 1929
- Contribution à l'étude des Loganiacées asiatiques de – Paul Dop – 1910
- Les Callicarpa de l'Indochine – Paul Dop – 1932
- Recherches sur la structure et le dévoloppment de la fleur – Paul Dop – 1903
- Flore de la région toulousaine – Paul Dop – 1910
- Les Cléthracées asiatiques – Paul Dop – 1928
- Les Symphorémoldées de l'Indochine – René Dupont, Paul Dop, Université de Toulouse. Laboratoire forestier – 1933
- Description de quelques espèces nouvelles de Madagascar – Marcel Dubard, Paul Dop
- Recherches anatomiques sur la fleur du Tanghin du Ménabé – Paul Dop – 1904
- Contribution a l'étude des Malpighiacées de Madagascar – Marcel Dubard, Paul Dop – 1908
- Les Vitex de l'Indo-Chine – Paul Dop – 1928
- Les Symphorémoidées de l'Indochine – Paul Dop – 1933
- Contribution à l'étude des Bignoniacées – Paul Dop – 1925
- Un Nouveau genre d'éricacées de l'Annam – Paul Dop, Laboratoire forestier (Toulouse) – 1931
- Bignoniacées nouvelles de l'Indo-Chine – Paul Dop – 1926

== Eponyms ==
- Pauldopia Steenis 1969 in the family Bignoniaceae
- (Ericaceae) Vaccinium dopii H.F.Cope (=Vaccinium dunalianum var. urophyllum Rehder & E.H. Wilson)
- (Lamiaceae) Premna dopii C.Pei (=Premna tapintzeana Dop)
- (Lamiaceae) Teucrium × dopii Sennen
