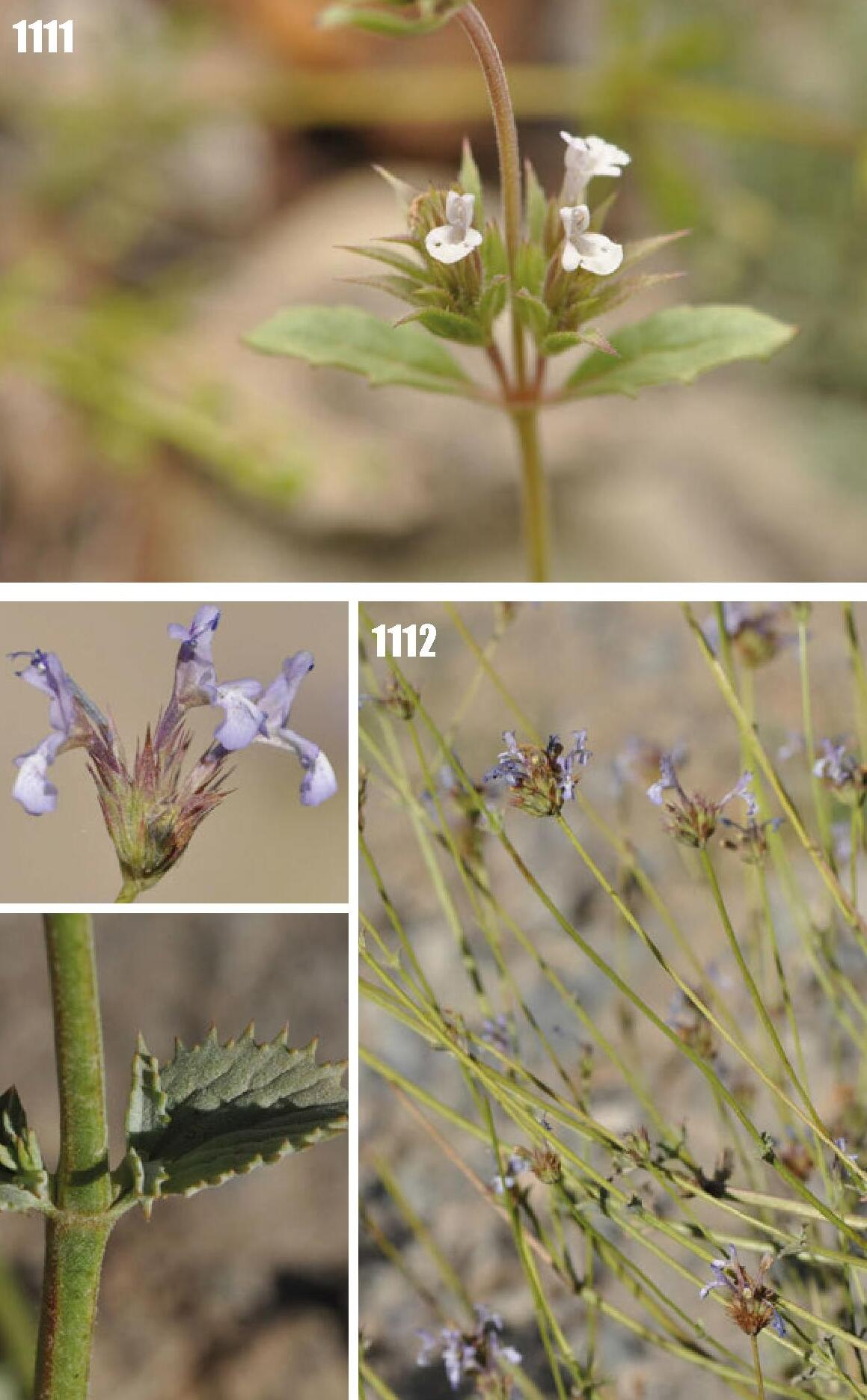
- K. jacubii and K. korshinskyi

Scientific classification
- Kingdom: Plantae
- Clade: Tracheophytes
- Clade: Angiosperms
- Clade: Eudicots
- Clade: Asterids
- Order: Lamiales
- Family: Lamiaceae
- Subfamily: Nepetoideae
- Tribe: Mentheae
- Genus: Kudrjaschevia; Pojark.

= Kudrjaschevia =

Genus of flowering plants

Kudrjaschevia is a genus of plants in the Lamiaceae, first described in 1953. It is native to mountainous regions of south-central Asia.

Species

- Kudrjaschevia grubovii Kochk. - Tajikistan
- Kudrjaschevia jacubii (Lipsky) Pojark. - Tajikistan, Afghanistan, Kyrgyzstan
- Kudrjaschevia korshinskyi (Lipsky) Pojark. - Tajikistan, Afghanistan
- Kudrjaschevia nadinae (Lipsky) Pojark. - Tajikistan
- Kudrjaschevia pojarkovae Ikonn. - Tajikistan
