= Rhaphiodon =

Rhaphiodon is the scientific name of two genera of organisms and may refer to:

- Rhaphiodon (fish), a genus of fish in the family Cynodontidae
- Rhaphiodon (plant), a genus of plants in the family Lamiaceae
