= Eriothymus =

Scientific classification
- Kingdom: Plantae
- Clade: Tracheophytes
- Clade: Angiosperms
- Clade: Eudicots
- Clade: Asterids
- Order: Lamiales
- Family: Lamiaceae
- Subfamily: Nepetoideae
- Tribe: Mentheae
- Genus: Eriothymus (Benth.) Rchb.
- Species: E. rubiaceus

Binomial name
- Eriothymus rubiaceus (Benth.) J.A.Schmidt

Synonyms
- Keithia rubiacea Benth.; Hedeoma rubiacea (Benth.) Briq.

Genus of plants

Eriothymus is a genus of flowering plant in the family Lamiaceae, first described as a genus in 1835. It contains only one known species, Eriothymus rubiaceus. It is endemic to the State of Minas Gerais in Brazil.
