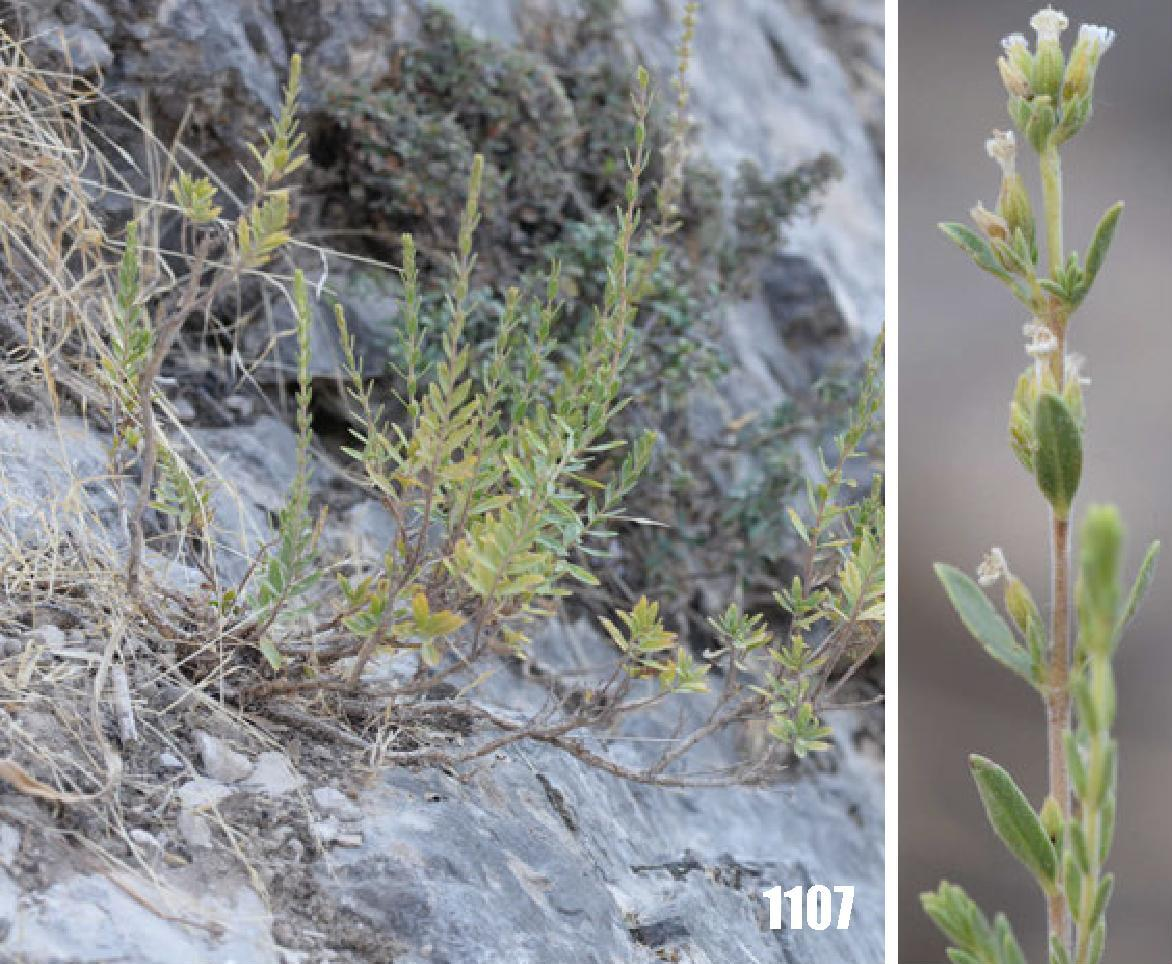

Scientific classification
- Kingdom: Plantae
- Clade: Tracheophytes
- Clade: Angiosperms
- Clade: Eudicots
- Clade: Asterids
- Order: Lamiales
- Family: Lamiaceae
- Subfamily: Nepetoideae
- Tribe: Mentheae
- Genus: Gontscharovia; Boriss.
- Species: G. popovii

Binomial name
- Gontscharovia popovii (B.Fedtsch. & Gontsch.) Boriss.

Synonyms
- Satureja popovii B.Fedtsch. & Gontsch.; Micromeria gontscharovii Vved.; Micromeria popovii (B.Fedtsch. & Gontsch.) Vved.; Micromeria afghanica Freitag

= Gontscharovia =

Genus of plants

Gontscharovia is a genus of flowering plant in the family Lamiaceae, first described in 1953. It contains only one known species, Gontscharovia popovii, native to the mountains of south-central Asia (Afghanistan, Pakistan, Tajikistan, Uzbekistan and Kashmir).
