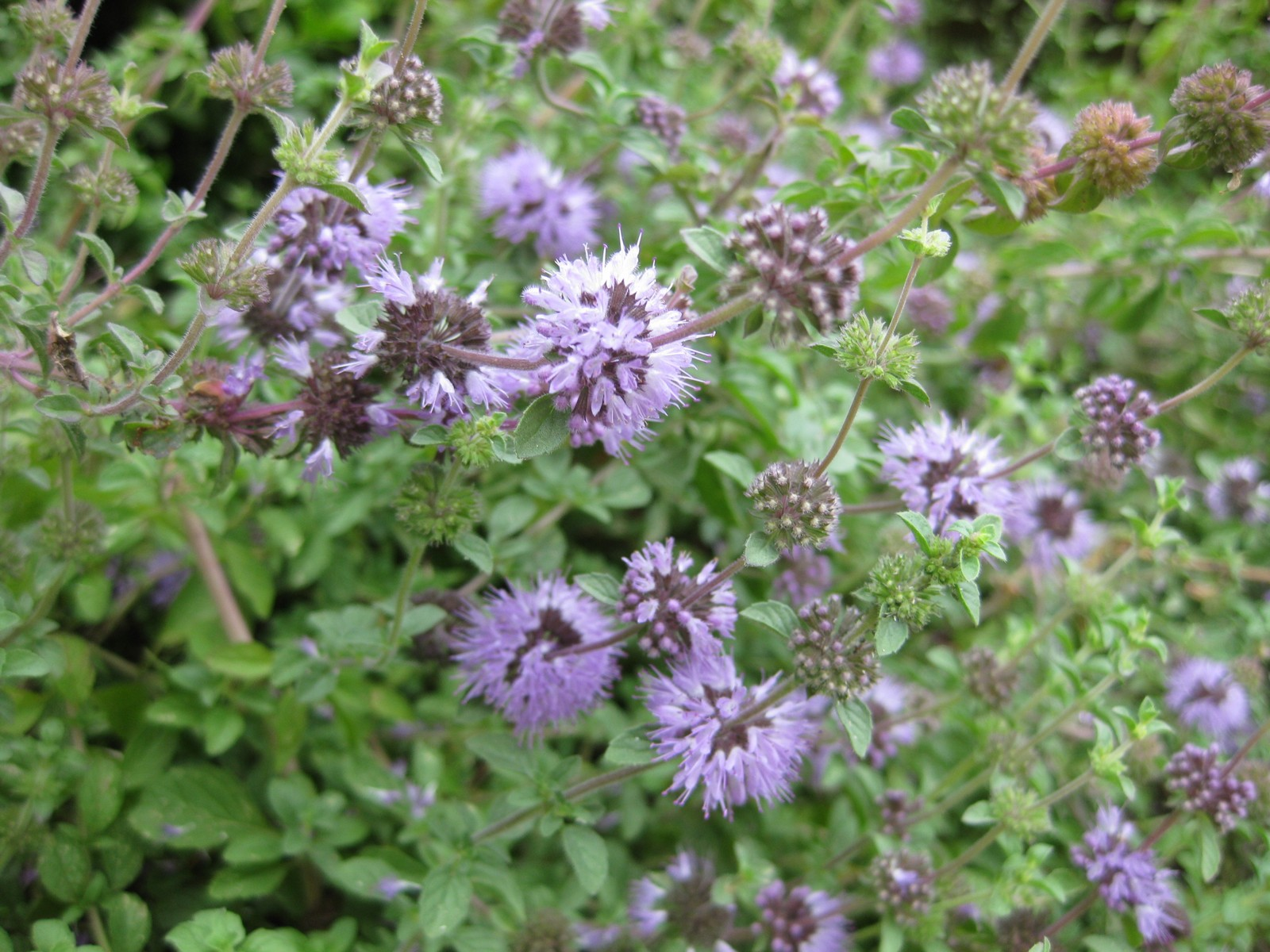
- Mentha pulegium

Scientific classification
- Kingdom: Plantae
- Clade: Tracheophytes
- Clade: Angiosperms
- Clade: Eudicots
- Clade: Asterids
- Order: Lamiales
- Family: Lamiaceae
- Subfamily: Nepetoideae
- Tribe: Mentheae

Type genus
- Mentha

Genera
- See text

= Mentheae =

Tribe of flowering plants in the sage family

Mentheae is the largest tribe of plants in the family Lamiaceae. It includes herbs such as sage, hyssop, mint, catnip, bee balm and thyme.

== Genera ==
=== Subtribe Lycopinae ===
- Lycopus (21 living species)

=== Subtribe Menthinae ===
- Acanthomintha
- Blephilia
- Bystropogon
- Clinopodium
- Conradina
- Cuminia
- Cunila
- Cyclotrichium
- Dicerandra
- Drymosiphon
- Eriothymus
- Glechon
- Gontscharovia
- Hedeoma
- Hesperozygis
- Hoehnea
- Killickia (treated as part of Micromeria by Harley et al. 2004)
- Kurzamra
- Mentha
- Micromeria
- Minthostachys
- Monarda
- Monardella
- Obtegomeria
- Origanum
- Pentapleura
- Piloblephis
- Pogogyne
- Poliomintha
- Pycnanthemum
- Rhabdocaulon
- Rhododon
- Saccocalyx
- Satureja
- Stachydeoma
- Thymbra
- Thymus
- Zataria
- Ziziphora

=== Subtribe Nepetinae ===
- Agastache
- Cedronella
- Dracocephalum
- Drepanocaryum
- Glechoma
- Heterolamium
- Hymenocrater
- Hyssopus
- Kudrjaschevia
- Lallemantia
- Lophanthus
- Marmoritis
- Meehania
- Nepeta
- Schizonepeta

=== Subtribe Prunellinae ===
- Cleonia
- Horminum
- Prunella

=== Subtribe Salviinae ===
- Chaunostoma
- Dorystaechas
- Lepechinia
- Melissa
- Meriandra, syn. of Salvia
- Salvia

=== Incertae sedis ===
(uncertain placement):

- Acinos (treated as part of Clinopodium by Harley et al. 2004)
