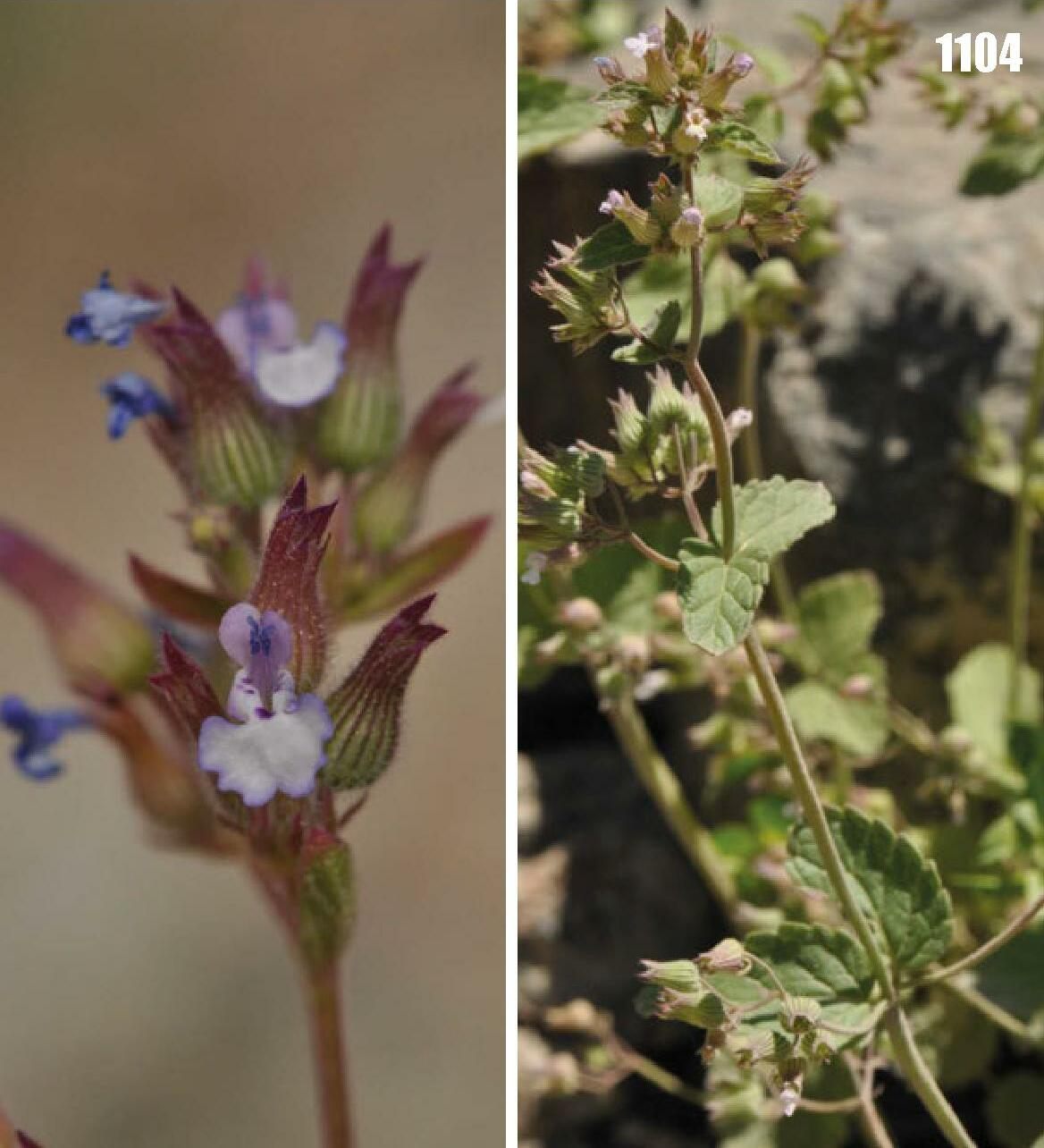

Scientific classification
- Kingdom: Plantae
- Clade: Tracheophytes
- Clade: Angiosperms
- Clade: Eudicots
- Clade: Asterids
- Order: Lamiales
- Family: Lamiaceae
- Subfamily: Nepetoideae
- Tribe: Mentheae
- Genus: Drepanocaryum; Pojark.
- Species: D. sewerzowii

Binomial name
- Drepanocaryum sewerzowii (Regel) Pojark.

Synonyms
- Nepeta sewerzowii Regel; Glechoma sewerzowii (Regel) Kuntze

= Drepanocaryum =

Genus of flowering plants

Drepanocaryum is a genus of flowering plant in the family Lamiaceae, first described in 1954. It contains only one known species, Drepanocaryum sewerzowii, native to west, central and south-central Asia (Iran, Afghanistan, Pakistan, Kyrgyzstan, Turkmenistan, Uzbekistan, Tajikistan).
