= Cyclotrichium =

Scientific classification
- Kingdom: Plantae
- Clade: Tracheophytes
- Clade: Angiosperms
- Clade: Eudicots
- Clade: Asterids
- Order: Lamiales
- Family: Lamiaceae
- Subfamily: Nepetoideae
- Tribe: Mentheae
- Genus: Cyclotrichium (Boiss.) Manden. & Scheng.

Genus of plant in the mint family

Cyclotrichium is a genus of plants in the Lamiaceae, first described as a genus in 1953. The entire genus is endemic to southwestern Asia (Iran, Iraq, Turkey, Syria, Lebanon).

Species

- Cyclotrichium depauperatum (Bunge) Manden. & Scheng. - western Iran
- Cyclotrichium glabrescens (Boiss. ex Rech.f.) Leblebici - southeastern Turkey
- Cyclotrichium haussknechtii (Bunge) Manden. & Scheng. - western Iran
- Cyclotrichium leucotrichum (Stapf ex Rech.f.) Leblebici - Iran, Iraq, Turkey
- Cyclotrichium longiflorum Leblebici - Iran, Iraq, Turkey
- Cyclotrichium niveum (Boiss.) Manden. & Scheng - eastern Turkey
- Cyclotrichium origanifolium (Labill.) Manden. & Scheng. - Lebanon, Syria, southern Turkey
- Cyclotrichium stamineum (Boiss. & Hohen.) Manden. & Scheng. - Iraq, Turkey
- Cyclotrichium straussii (Bornm.) Rech.f. - western Iran
