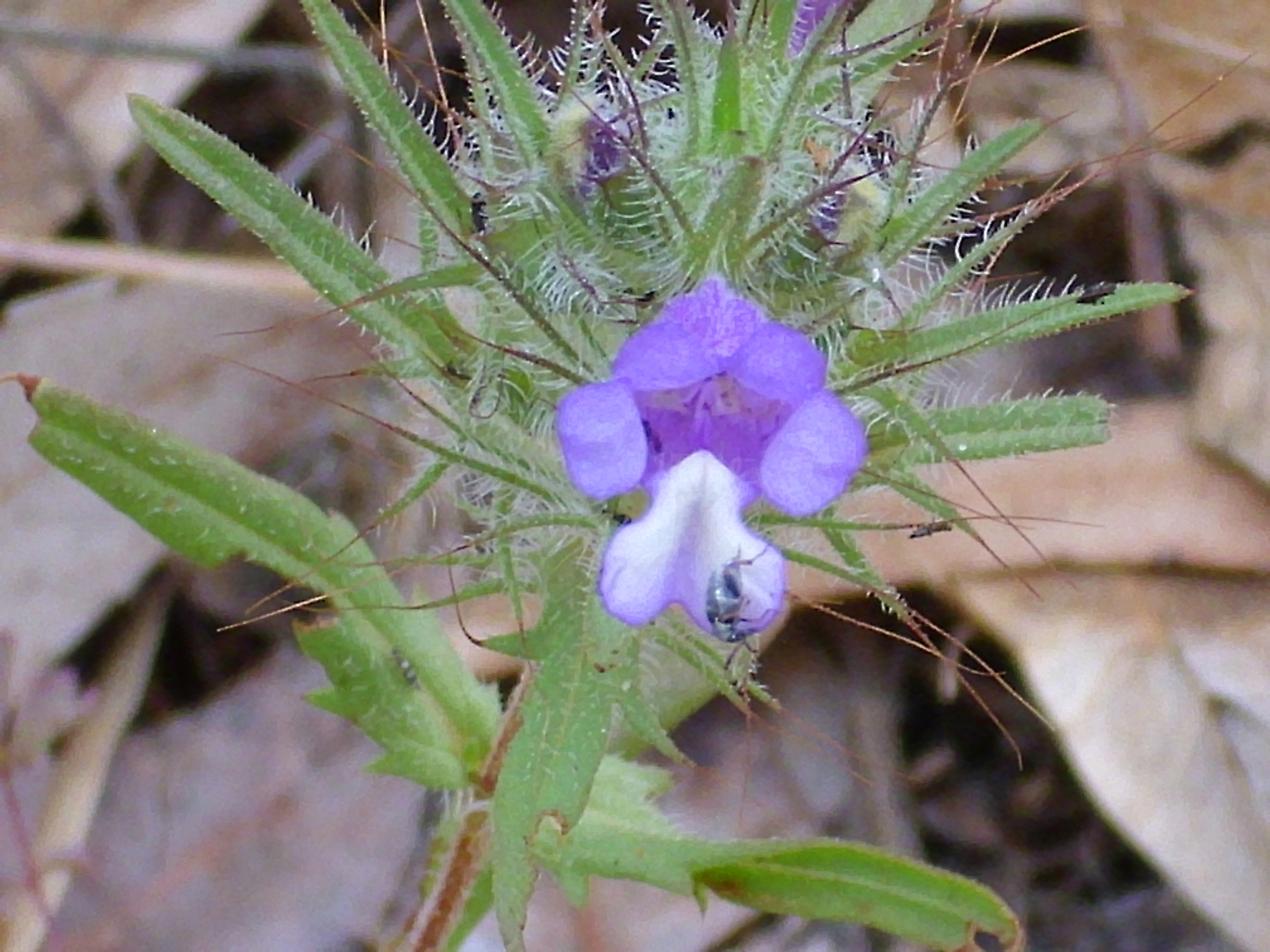
- Dehesa Boyal de Puertollano, Spain photo by Javier Martín

Scientific classification
- Kingdom: Plantae
- Clade: Tracheophytes
- Clade: Angiosperms
- Clade: Eudicots
- Clade: Asterids
- Order: Lamiales
- Family: Lamiaceae
- Subfamily: Nepetoideae
- Tribe: Mentheae
- Genus: Cleonia; L.
- Species: C. lusitanica

Binomial name
- Cleonia lusitanica (L.) L.

Synonyms
- Prunella lusitanica L.; Prunella odorata Lam.; Cleonia lusitanica var. aristata Cout.; Cleonia punica Beauverd

= Cleonia =

Genus of flowering plants

Cleonia is a genus of plants in the mint family (Lamiaceae), first described in 1763. It contains only one known species, Cleonia lusitanica, native to Spain, Portugal, Algeria, Morocco, and Tunisia.
