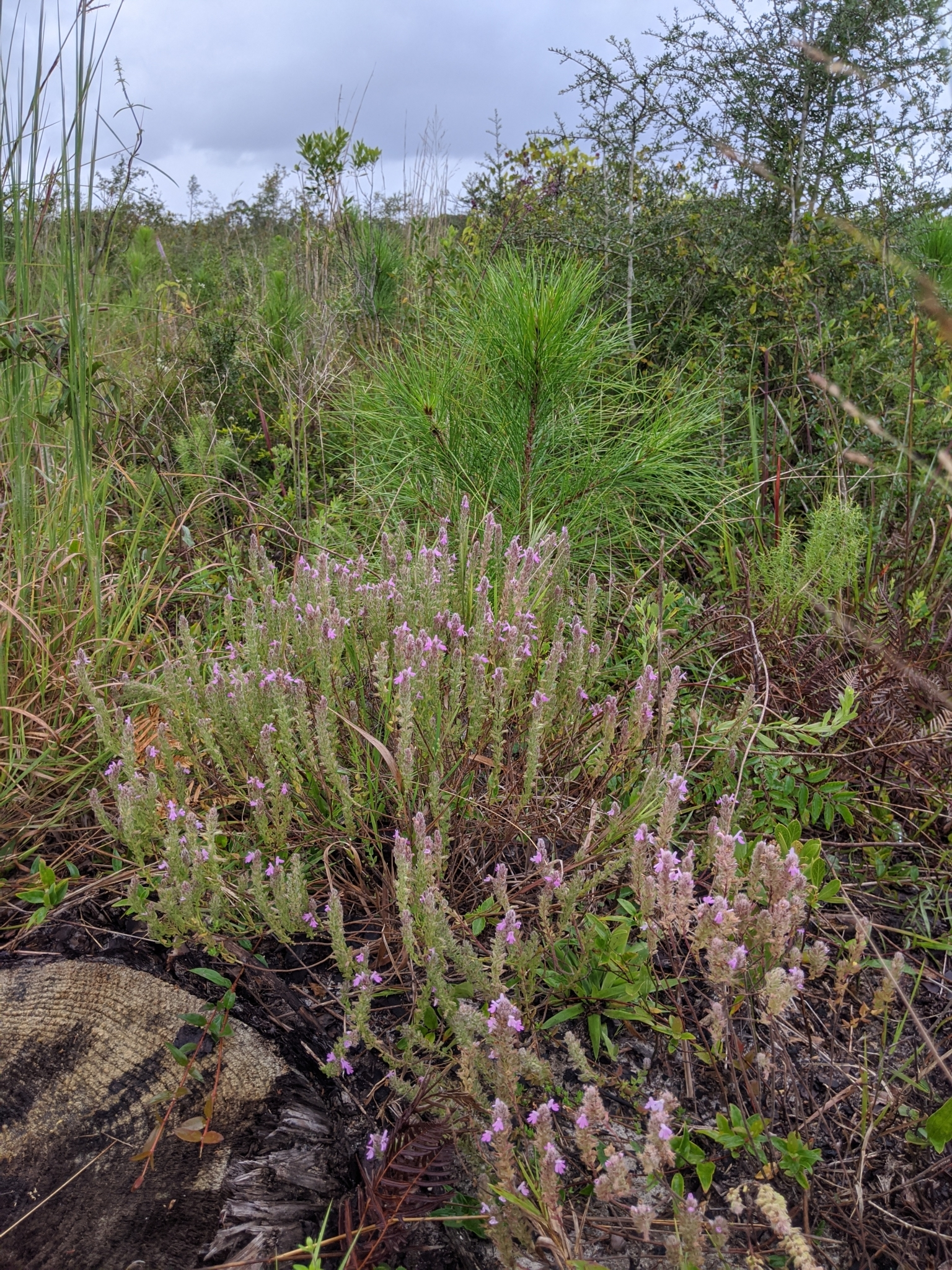

Conservation status
- Imperiled (NatureServe)

Scientific classification
- Kingdom: Plantae
- Clade: Tracheophytes
- Clade: Angiosperms
- Clade: Eudicots
- Clade: Asterids
- Order: Lamiales
- Family: Lamiaceae
- Subfamily: Nepetoideae
- Tribe: Mentheae
- Genus: Stachydeoma; Small
- Species: S. graveolens

Binomial name
- Stachydeoma graveolens (Chapm. ex A.Gray) Small

Synonyms
- Hedeoma graveolens Chapm. ex A.Gray

= Stachydeoma =

Genus of flowering plants

Stachydeoma, common name mock pennyroyal, is a genus of flowering plant in the family Lamiaceae, first described as a genus in 1903. It contains only one known species, Stachydeoma graveolens, endemic to the state of Florida in the United States. It has been found only in the northwestern part of the state, referred to colloquially as the "Panhandle."
