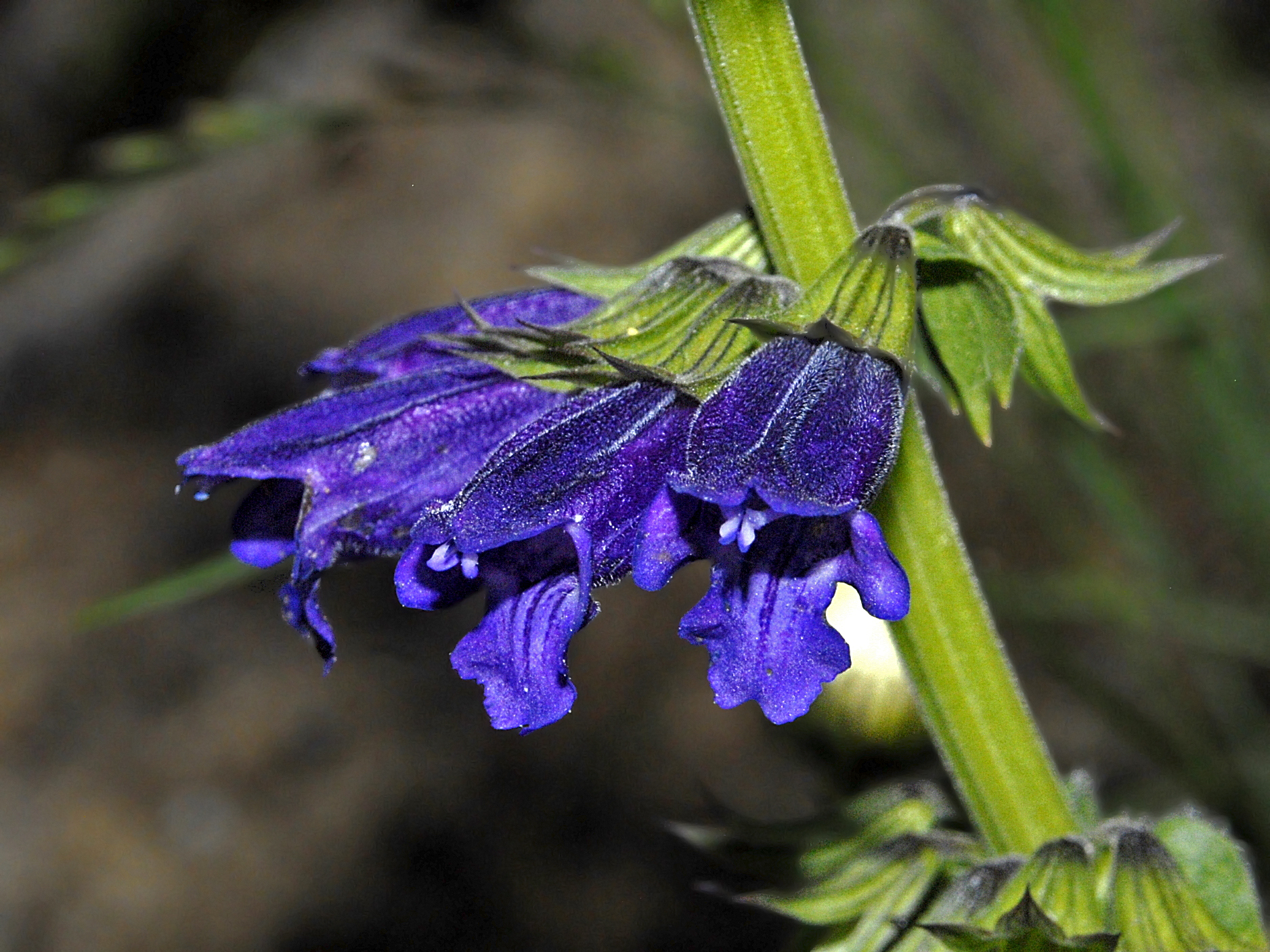
- Flowers of Horminum pyrenaicum at the Giardino Botanico Alpino Chanousia

Scientific classification
- Kingdom: Plantae
- Clade: Tracheophytes
- Clade: Angiosperms
- Clade: Eudicots
- Clade: Asterids
- Order: Lamiales
- Family: Lamiaceae
- Subfamily: Nepetoideae
- Tribe: Mentheae
- Genus: Horminum; L.
- Species: H. pyrenaicum

Binomial name
- Horminum pyrenaicum L.

= Horminum =

Genus of flowering plants

Horminum is a genus of flowering plants in the family Lamiaceae, comprising a single species, Horminum pyrenaicum. Common names include dragonmouth and Pyrenean dead-nettle.

== Description ==
Horminum pyrenaicum is a perennial plant growing to 45 cm tall. The square stems have small hairs with sessile glands. The leaves are produced in basal rosettes, 3–7 cm long and 2–5 cm broad, long-stalked, ovate, glossy deep green, quilted, with a bluntly toothed margin. The flowers are produced in whorls on the upper stems, violet-blue or dark purple, tubular or bell-shaped, 1.5–2 cm long, with two lips. The flowering period extends from July to August.

== Cultivation ==
Grow in peaty, well-drained but not overly rich soil in full sun. This is an alpine plant best suited to areas with mild summers where nights are cool. Keep evenly moist and feed once at the start of the growing season with a ration of slow-release fertiliser. Propagate from seed sown in autumn and exposed to low winter temperatures, or by dividing established clumps in spring.

== Distribution ==
This species is native to the Pyrenees and Alps in western Europe.

== Habitat ==
Horminum pyrenaicum prefers rocky slopes, pastures and grasslands at elevation of 1,400–2,500 metres (4,600–8,200 ft) above sea level.

== Gallery ==
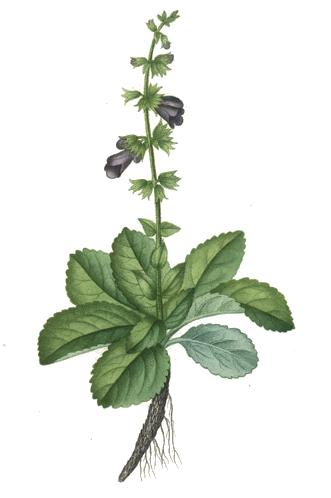
Illustration from "La flore et la pomone françaises" by J.H. Saint-Hilaire, 1832.

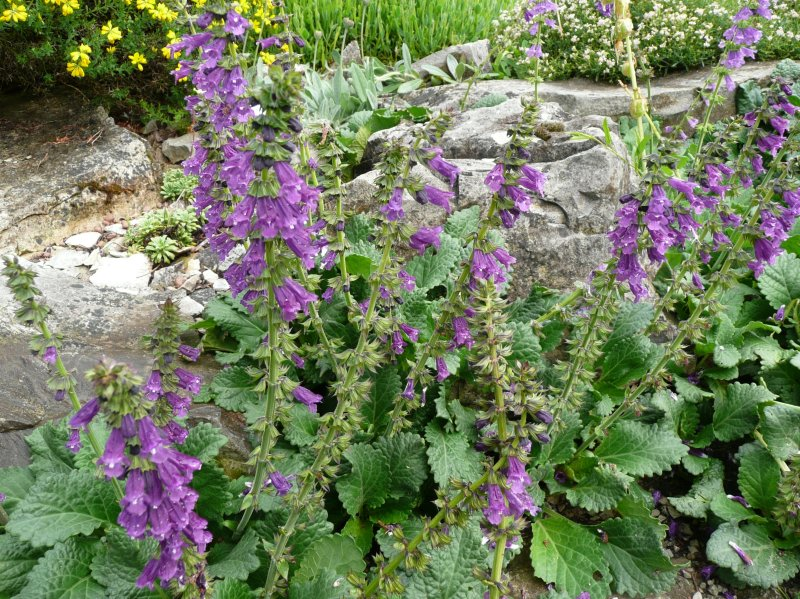
Plants

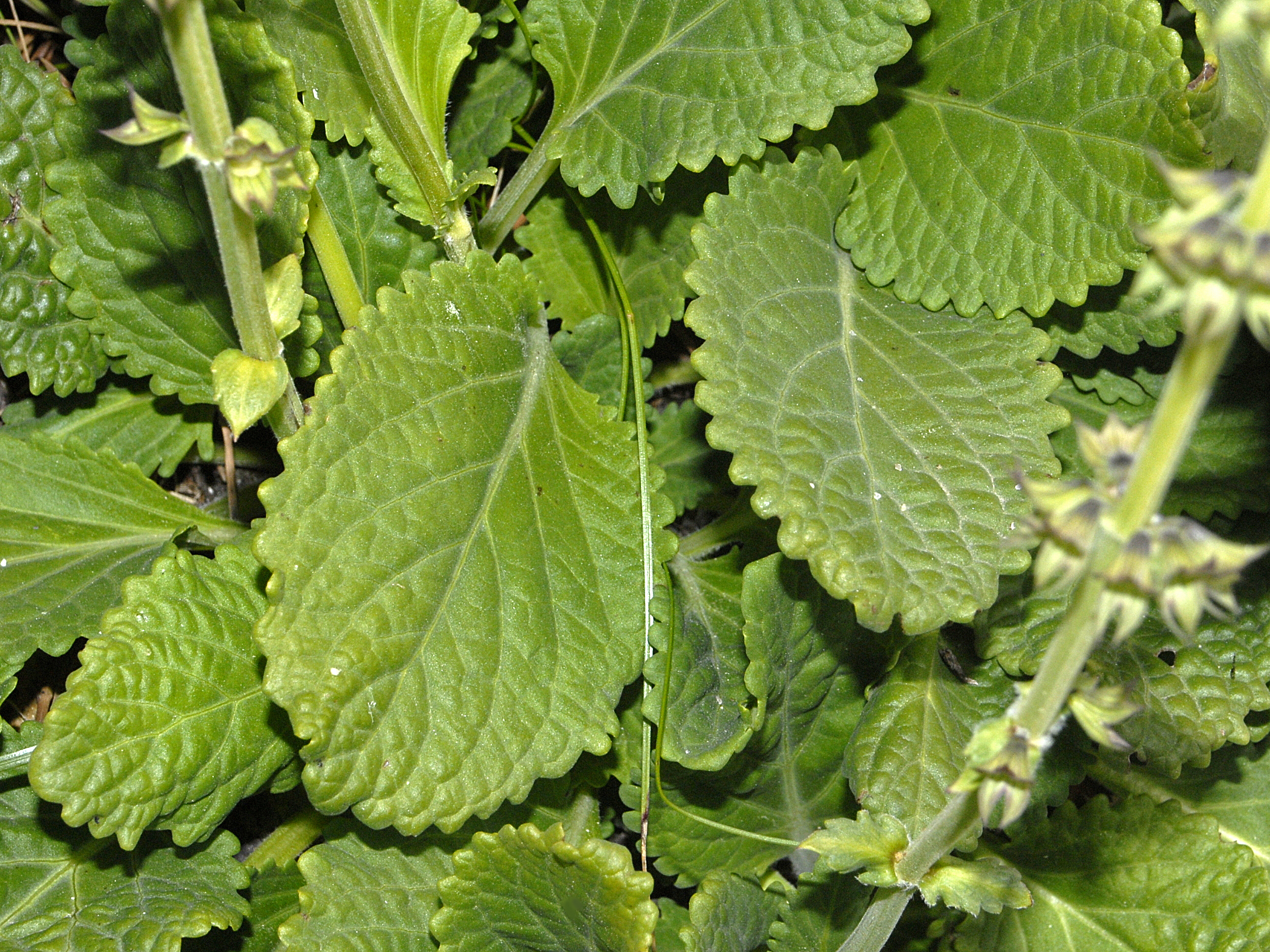
Basal leaves
