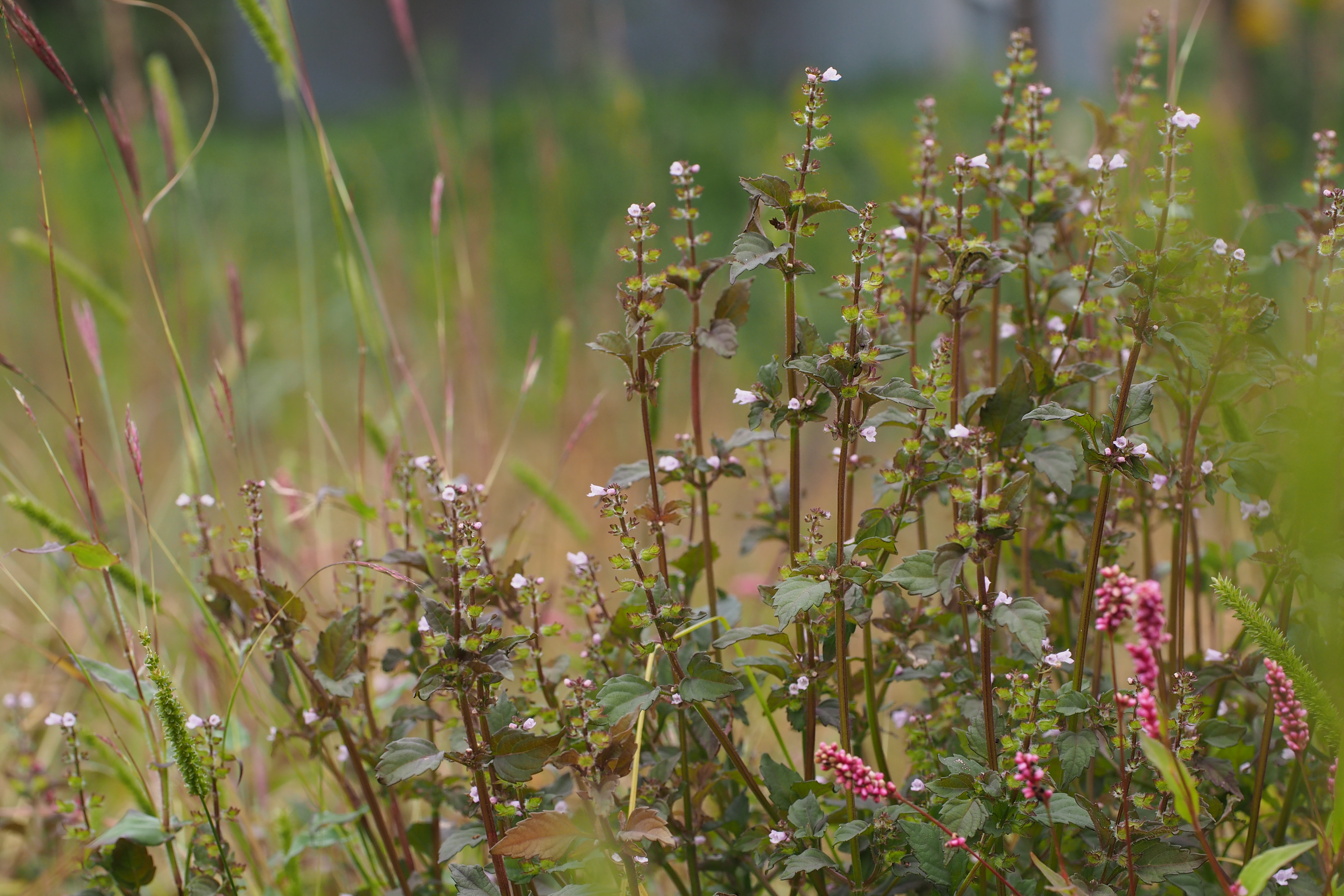
- Mosla dianthera

Scientific classification
- Kingdom: Plantae
- Clade: Tracheophytes
- Clade: Angiosperms
- Clade: Eudicots
- Clade: Asterids
- Order: Lamiales
- Family: Lamiaceae
- Subfamily: Nepetoideae
- Tribe: Elsholtzieae
- Genus: Mosla (Benth.) Buch.-Ham. ex Maxim.

Synonyms
- Hedeoma Persoon sect. Mosla Bentham; Orthodon Benth. 1865 not R.Br. 1819

= Mosla =

Genus of flowering plants

Mosla is a genus of plants in the family Lamiaceae, first described as a genus in 1875. It is native to eastern Asia, the Himalayas, and southeastern Asia.

Species

1. Mosla bracteata Doan ex Suddee & A.J.Paton - Vietnam
2. Mosla cavaleriei H.Lév.- Vietnam, Guangdong, Guangxi, Guizhou, Hubei, Jiangxi, Sichuan, Yunnan, Zhejiang
3. Mosla chinensis Maxim. - Vietnam, Korea, Japan, Anhui, Fujian, Guangdong, Guangxi, Guizhou, Hubei, Hunan, Jiangsu, Jiangxi, Shandong, Sichuan, Taiwan, Zhejiang
4. Mosla coreana H.Lév. - Korea
5. Mosla dianthera (Buch.-Ham. ex Roxb.) Maxim. - China, Japan, Korea, Ryukyu Islands, Kuril Islands, Primorye, Caucasus, Himalayas (Nepal, Bangladesh, Bhutan, northern + eastern India), Myanmar, Vietnam, Philippines, Sumatra
6. Mosla exfoliata (C.Y.Wu) C.Y.Wu & H.W.Li - Sichuan
7. Mosla hangchouensis Matsuda - Zhejiang
8. Mosla japonica (Benth. ex Oliv.) Maxim. - Japan, Korea, Ryukyu Islands
9. Mosla longibracteata (C.Y.Wu & S.J.Hsuan) C.Y.Wu & H.W.Li - Guangxi, Zhejiang
10. Mosla longispica (C.Y.Wu) C.Y.Wu & H.W.Li - Jiangxi
11. Mosla pauciflora (C.Y.Wu) C.Y.Wu & H.W.Li - Guizhou, Hubei, Sichuan
12. Mosla punctulata Nakai - Korea, Taiwan, Japan, China
13. Mosla scabra (Thunb.) C.Y.Wu & H.W.Li - Vietnam, Korea, Japan, Ryukyu Islands, Anhui, Fujian, Gansu, Guangdong, Guangxi, Henan, Hubei, Hunan, Jiangsu, Jiangxi, Liaoning, Shaanxi, Sichuan, Taiwan, Zhejiang
14. Mosla soochouensis Matsuda - Anhui, Jiangsu, Jiangxi, Zhejiang
15. Mosla tamdaoensis Phuong - Vietnam
