= Benguellia =

Scientific classification
- Kingdom: Plantae
- Clade: Tracheophytes
- Clade: Angiosperms
- Clade: Eudicots
- Clade: Asterids
- Order: Lamiales
- Family: Lamiaceae
- Subfamily: Nepetoideae
- Tribe: Ocimeae
- Genus: Benguellia; G.Taylor
- Species: B. lanceolata

Binomial name
- Benguellia lanceolata (Gürke) G.Taylor

Synonyms
- Orthosiphon lanceolatus Gürke

Genus of flowering plants

Benguellia is a genus of plants in the family Lamiaceae, first described in 1931. It contains only one known species, Benguellia lanceolata, endemic to Angola.
