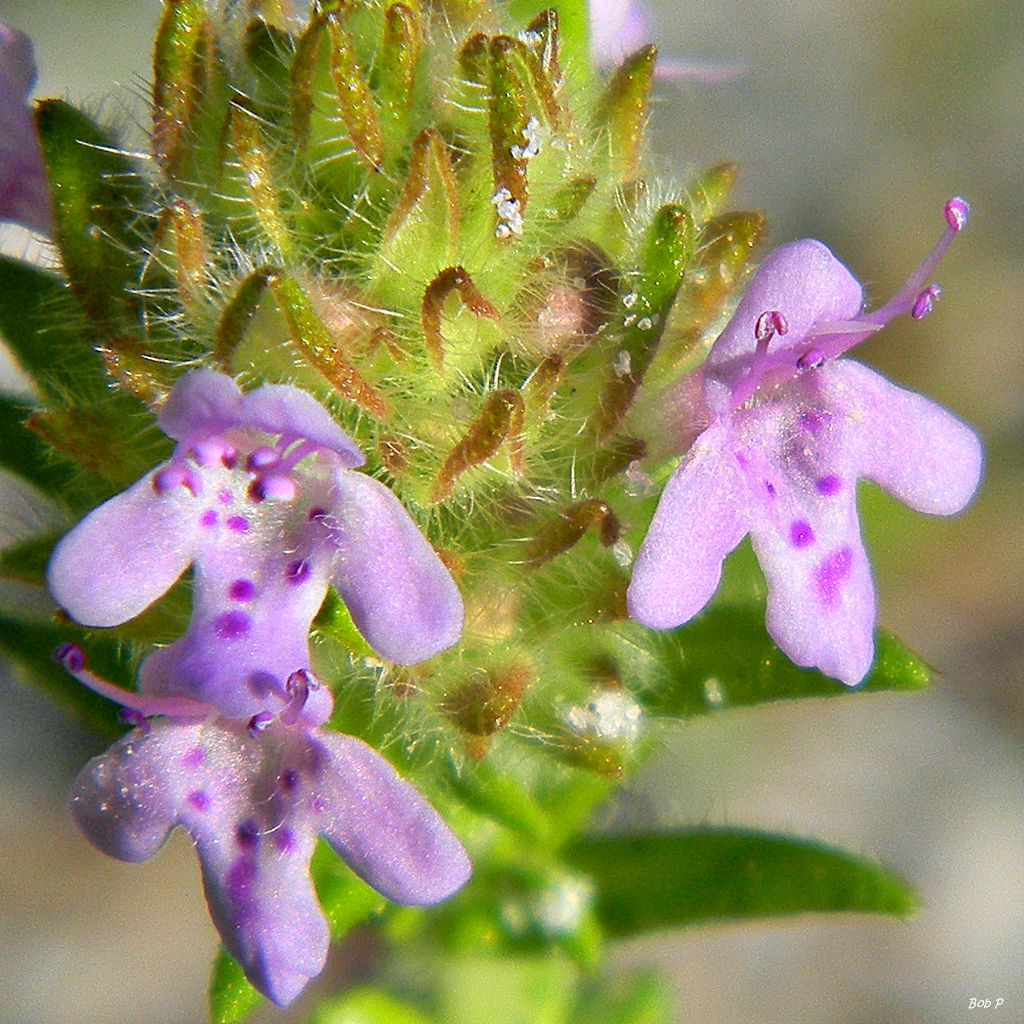

Conservation status
- Vulnerable (NatureServe)

Scientific classification
- Kingdom: Plantae
- Clade: Tracheophytes
- Clade: Angiosperms
- Clade: Eudicots
- Clade: Asterids
- Order: Lamiales
- Family: Lamiaceae
- Subfamily: Nepetoideae
- Tribe: Mentheae
- Genus: Piloblephis; Raf.
- Species: P. rigida

Binomial name
- Piloblephis rigida (Bartram ex Benth.) Raf.

Synonyms
- Pycnothymus (Benth.) Small; Satureja rigida Bartram ex Benth.; Clinopodium rigidum (Bartram ex Benth.) Kuntze; Pycnothymus rigidus (Bartram ex Benth.) Small; Piloblephis ericoides Raf.

= Piloblephis =

Genus of flowering plants

Piloblephis is a monotypic genus of flowering plant in the family Lamiaceae, first described in 1838. It contains only one known species, Piloblephis rigida, the wild pennyroyal, or pennyroyal native to Florida, southern Georgia, and the Bahamas.
