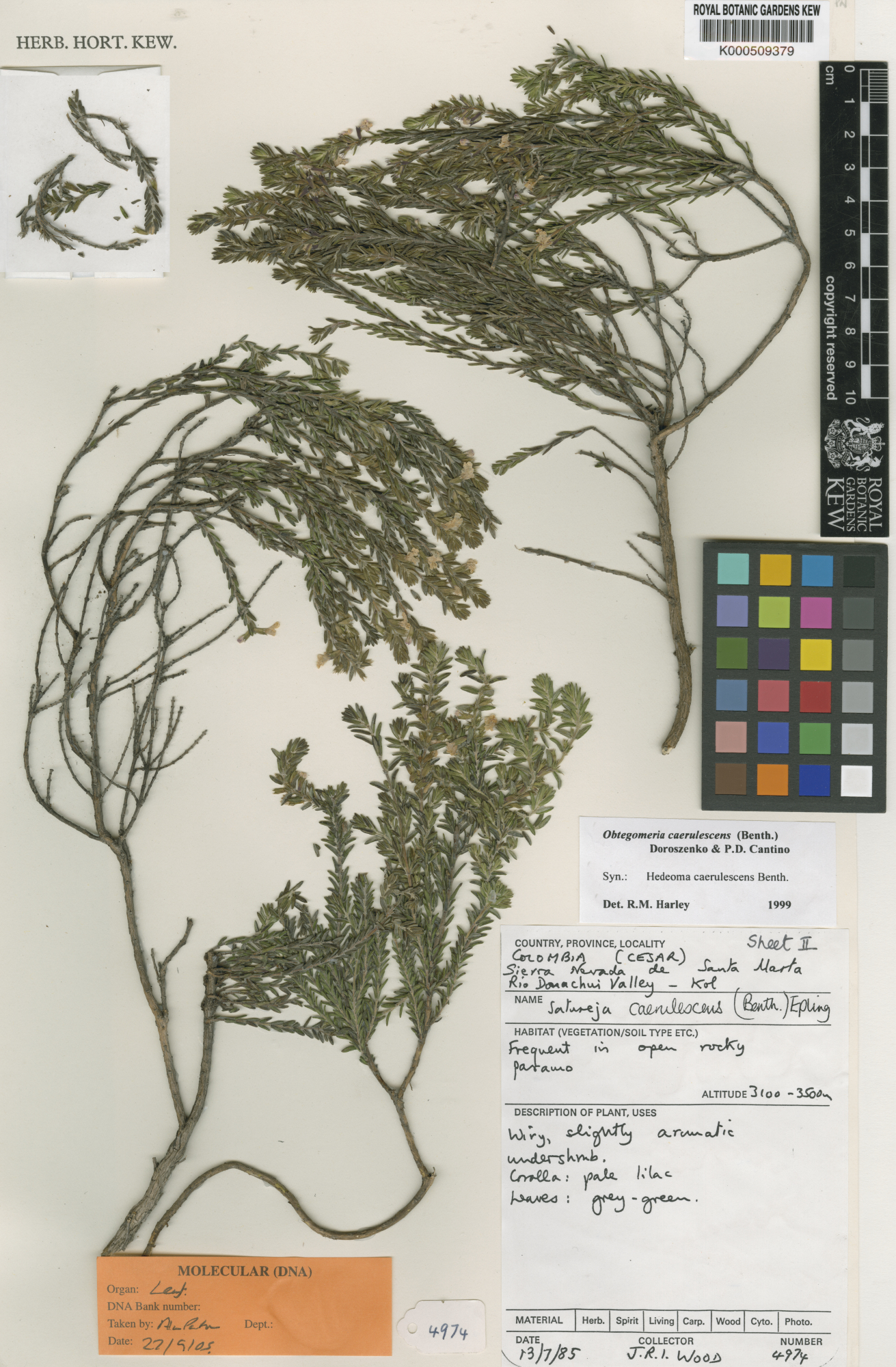

Scientific classification
- Kingdom: Plantae
- Clade: Tracheophytes
- Clade: Angiosperms
- Clade: Eudicots
- Clade: Asterids
- Order: Lamiales
- Family: Lamiaceae
- Subfamily: Nepetoideae
- Tribe: Mentheae
- Genus: Obtegomeria; Doroszenko & P.D.Cantino
- Species: O. caerulescens

Binomial name
- Obtegomeria caerulescens (Benth.) Doroszenko & P.D.Cantino

Synonyms
- Hedeoma caerulescens Benth.; Calamintha caerulescens (Benth.) Wedd.; Clinopodium caerulescens (Benth.) Kuntze; Satureja caerulescens (Benth.) Epling; Satureja lindeniana Briq.

= Obtegomeria =

Genus of flowering plants

Obtegomeria is a genus of flowering plant in the family Lamiaceae, first described in 1998. It contains only one known species, Obtegomeria caerulescens, endemic to the Sierra Nevada de Santa Marta in northern Colombia.
