= Zataria =

Scientific classification
- Kingdom: Plantae
- Clade: Embryophytes
- Clade: Tracheophytes
- Clade: Spermatophytes
- Clade: Angiosperms
- Clade: Eudicots
- Clade: Asterids
- Order: Lamiales
- Family: Lamiaceae
- Subfamily: Nepetoideae
- Tribe: Mentheae
- Genus: Zataria
- Species: Z. multiflora

Binomial name
- Zataria multiflora Boiss.

Synonyms
- Zataria bracteata Boiss.; Zataria multiflora var. elatior Boiss.

Species of plant in the mint family

Zataria is a genus of flowering plant in the family Lamiaceae, first described in 1876. It contains only one known species, Zataria multiflora, native to southwestern Asia (Iran, Afghanistan, Pakistan, Kashmir).
