= Heterolamium =

Scientific classification
- Kingdom: Plantae
- Clade: Tracheophytes
- Clade: Angiosperms
- Clade: Eudicots
- Clade: Asterids
- Order: Lamiales
- Family: Lamiaceae
- Subfamily: Nepetoideae
- Tribe: Mentheae
- Genus: Heterolamium; C.Y.Wu

Synonyms
- Changruicaoia Z.Y.Zhu

Genus of flowering plants

Heterolamium is a genus of plants in the family Lamiaceae, first described in 1965. The 2 known species are both endemic to China.

Species

- Heterolamium debile (Hemsl.) C.Y.Wu - Hubei, Hunan, Shaanxi, Sichuan, Yunnan
- Heterolamium flaviflorum (Z.Y.Zhu) L.Wei - Sichuan
