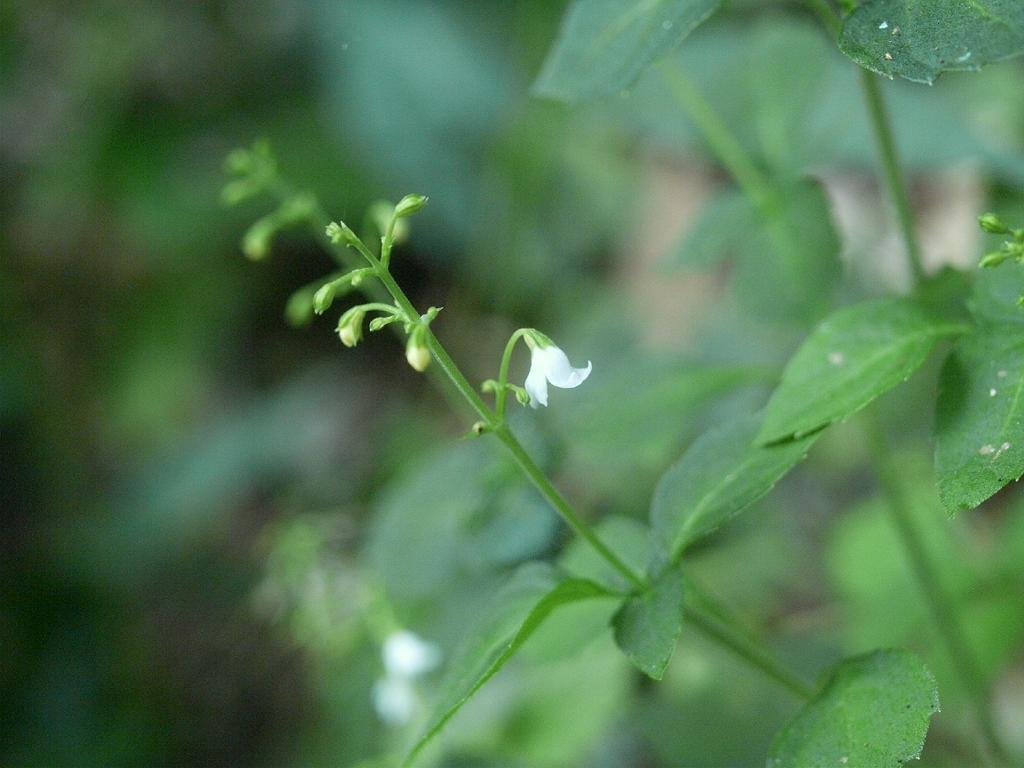
- Perillula

Scientific classification
- Kingdom: Plantae
- Clade: Tracheophytes
- Clade: Angiosperms
- Clade: Eudicots
- Clade: Asterids
- Order: Lamiales
- Family: Lamiaceae
- Subfamily: Nepetoideae
- Tribe: Elsholtzieae
- Genus: Perillula; Maxim.
- Species: P. reptans

Binomial name
- Perillula reptans Maxim.

= Perillula =

Genus of flowering plants

Perillula is a genus of flowering plant in the family Lamiaceae, first described in 1875. It contains only one known species, Perillula reptans, endemic to Japan (including the Ryukyu Islands).
