= Kurzamra =

Scientific classification
- Kingdom: Plantae
- Clade: Tracheophytes
- Clade: Angiosperms
- Clade: Eudicots
- Clade: Asterids
- Order: Lamiales
- Family: Lamiaceae
- Subfamily: Nepetoideae
- Tribe: Mentheae
- Genus: Kurzamra; Kuntze
- Species: K. pulchella

Binomial name
- Kurzamra pulchella (Clos) Kuntze

Synonyms
- Soliera Clos 1849, illegitimate; Soliera pulchella Clos; Micromeria pulchella (Clos) Wedd.

Genus of flowering plants

Kurzamra is a genus of flowering plant in the family Lamiaceae, first described in 1891. It contains only one known species, Kurzamra pulchella, native to Chile and northwestern Argentina.
