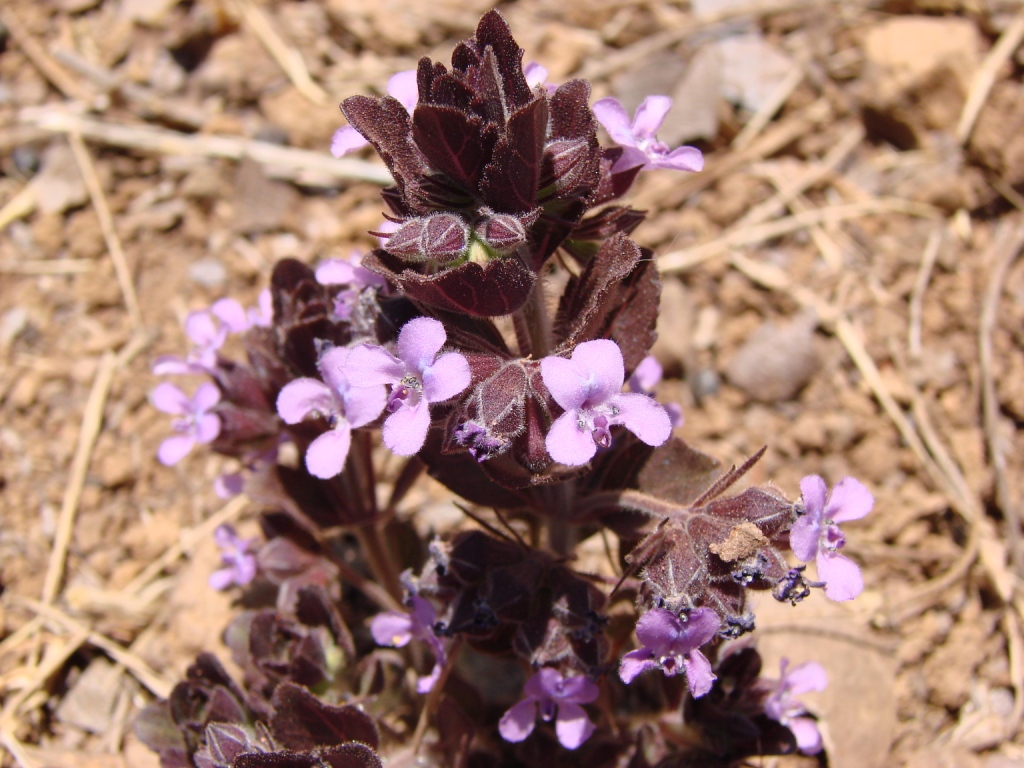
- Marsypianthes montana

Scientific classification
- Kingdom: Plantae
- Clade: Tracheophytes
- Clade: Angiosperms
- Clade: Eudicots
- Clade: Asterids
- Order: Lamiales
- Family: Lamiaceae
- Subfamily: Nepetoideae
- Tribe: Ocimeae
- Genus: Marsypianthes; Mart. ex Benth.

= Marsypianthes =

Genus of flowering plants

Marsypianthes is a genus of flowering plants in the family Lamiaceae, first described in 1833. It is native to South America, Central America, the West Indies, and southern Mexico.

Species

1. Marsypianthes burchellii Epling - Brazil
2. Marsypianthes chamaedrys (Vahl) Kuntze. - from southern Mexico and the West Indies south to Argentina
3. Marsypianthes foliolosa Benth. - Brazil
4. Marsypianthes hassleri Briq. - Paraguay, southern Brazil, Misiones Province of Argentina
5. Marsypianthes montana Benth. - Brazil
