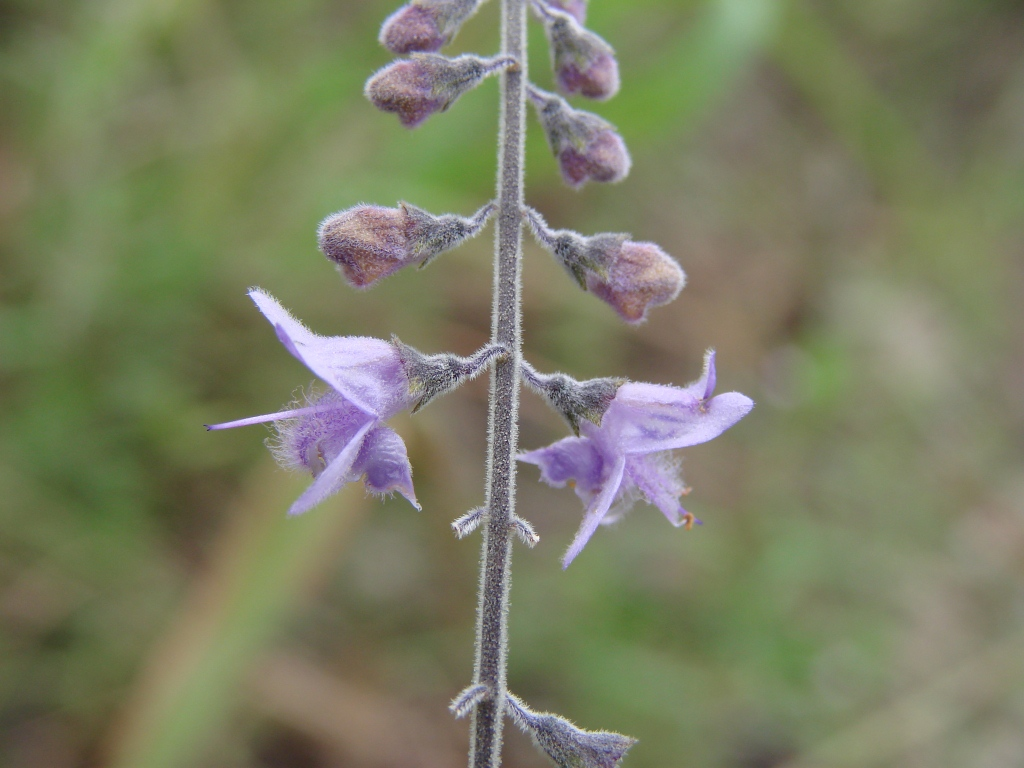
- Eriope macrostachya

Scientific classification
- Kingdom: Plantae
- Clade: Tracheophytes
- Clade: Angiosperms
- Clade: Eudicots
- Clade: Asterids
- Order: Lamiales
- Family: Lamiaceae
- Subfamily: Nepetoideae
- Tribe: Ocimeae
- Genus: Eriope; Humb. & Bonpl. ex Benth.

= Eriope =

Genus of flowering plants

Eriope is a genus of plants in the family Lamiaceae, first described in 1833. It is native to South America, many of the species endemic to Brazil.

Species

- Eriope alpestris Mart. ex Benth. - Minas Gerais
- Eriope anamariae Harley - Bahia
- Eriope angustifolia Epling - Minas Gerais
- Eriope arenaria Harley - Minas Gerais
- Eriope blanchetii (Benth.) Harley - northeastern Brazil
- Eriope complicata Mart. ex Benth. - Brazil
- Eriope confusa Harley - Bahia
- Eriope crassifolia Mart. ex Benth. - Bahia
- Eriope crassipes Benth. - Brazil, Paraguay, Venezuela, French Guiana, Bolivia, Colombia
- Eriope exaltata Harley - Bahia
- Eriope filifolia Benth. - Minas Gerais
- Eriope foetida A.St.-Hil. ex Benth. - Brazil
- Eriope glandulosa (Harley) Harley - Bahia, Minas Gerais
- Eriope hypenioides Mart. ex Benth. - Bahia
- Eriope hypoleuca (Benth.) Harley - Bahia, Minas Gerais
- Eriope latifolia (Mart. ex Benth.) Harley - eastern Brazil
- Eriope luetzelburgii Harley - Bahia
- Eriope machrisae (Epling) Harley - Goiás
- Eriope macrostachya Mart. ex Benth. - Brazil, Paraguay, Venezuela
- Eriope montana Harley - Bahia
- Eriope monticola Mart. ex Benth. - Bahia
- Eriope obovata Epling - northeastern Brazil
- Eriope parvifolia Mart. ex Benth. - Brazil
- Eriope polyphylla Mart. ex Benth. - Bahia
- Eriope salviifolia (Pohl ex Benth.) Harley - Bahia, Minas Gerais
- Eriope sincorana Harley - Bahia
- Eriope tumidicaulis Harley - Bahia
- Eriope velutina Epling - Brazil
- Eriope xavantium Harley - Mato Grosso
