= Rhabdocaulon =

Scientific classification
- Kingdom: Plantae
- Clade: Tracheophytes
- Clade: Angiosperms
- Clade: Eudicots
- Clade: Asterids
- Order: Lamiales
- Family: Lamiaceae
- Subfamily: Nepetoideae
- Tribe: Mentheae
- Genus: Rhabdocaulon (Benth.) Epling

Genus of flowering plants

Rhabdocaulon is a genus of plants in the family Lamiaceae, first described as a genus in 1936. It is native to South America.

Species

1. Rhabdocaulon coccineum (Benth.) Epling - southern Brazil
2. Rhabdocaulon denudatum (Benth.) Epling - Brazil
3. Rhabdocaulon erythrostachys Epling - southern Brazil
4. Rhabdocaulon gracile (Benth.) Epling - southern Brazil
5. Rhabdocaulon lavanduloides (Benth.) Epling - southern Brazil
6. Rhabdocaulon stenodontum (Briq.) Epling - southern Brazil, Paraguay, northeastern Argentina
7. Rhabdocaulon strictum (Benth.) Epling - southern Brazil, Uruguay, northeastern Argentina
