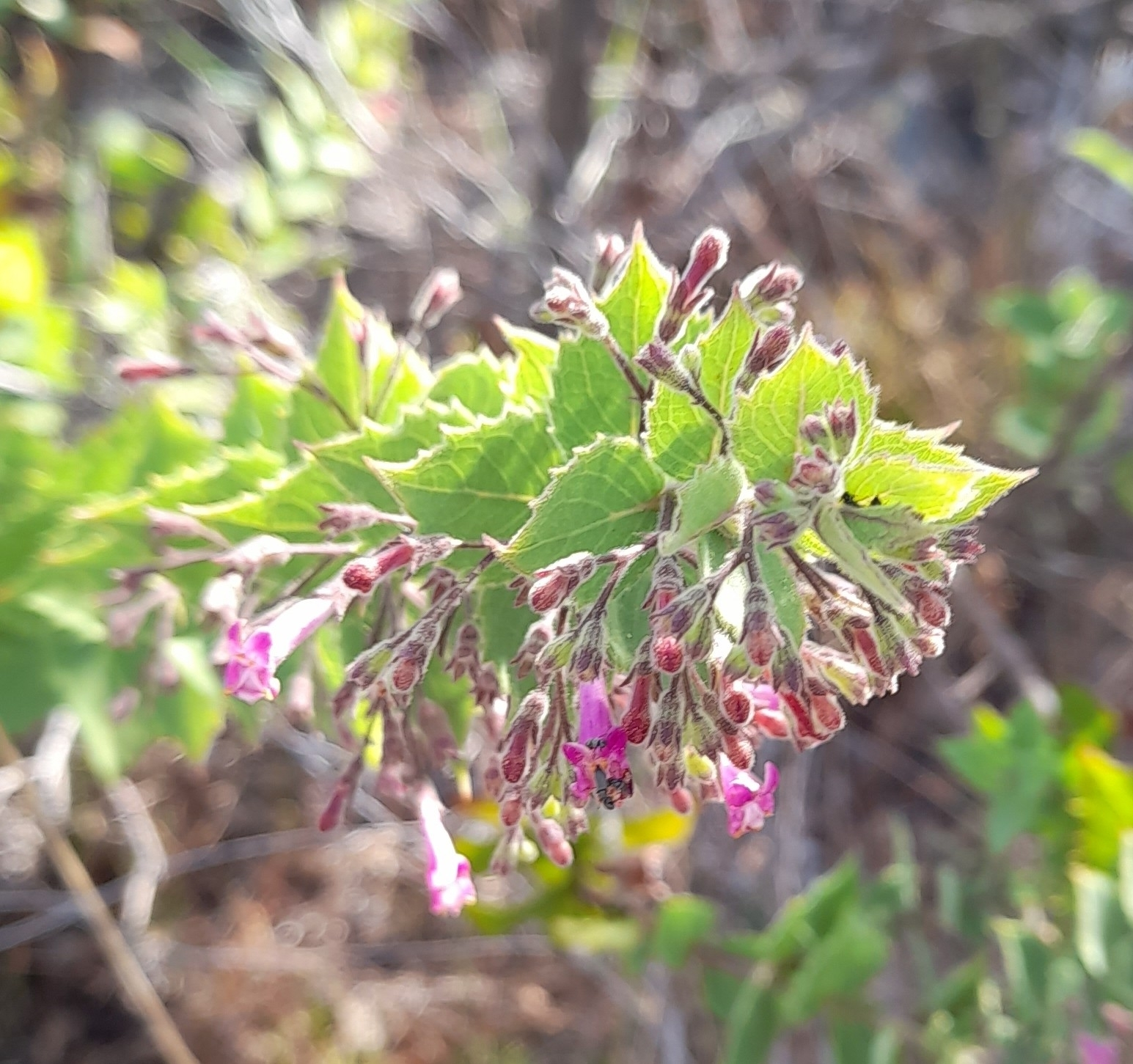
- Hyptidendron roseum

Scientific classification
- Kingdom: Plantae
- Clade: Tracheophytes
- Clade: Angiosperms
- Clade: Eudicots
- Clade: Asterids
- Order: Lamiales
- Family: Lamiaceae
- Subfamily: Nepetoideae
- Tribe: Ocimeae
- Genus: Hyptidendron; Harley

Synonyms
- Siagonarrhen Mart. ex J.A.Schmidt

= Hyptidendron =

Genus of flowering plants

Hyptidendron is a genus of plants in the family Lamiaceae that was first described in 1849. Species of the genus are endemic to South America.

== Species ==
The following species are recognised:

- Hyptidendron albidum Harley & Antar
- Hyptidendron amethystoides (Benth.) Harley - eastern Brazil
- Hyptidendron arboreum (Benth.) Harley - Guyana, Venezuela, Colombia, Ecuador, Peru, northwestern Brazil
- Hyptidendron arbusculum (Epling) Harley - Brazil
- Hyptidendron asperrimum (Spreng.) Harley - eastern Brazil
- Hyptidendron canum (Pohl ex Benth.) Harley - Brazil, Bolivia
- Hyptidendron caudatum (Epling & Játiva) Harley - Brazil
- Hyptidendron cerradoense Antar & Harley
- Hyptidendron claussenii (Benth.) Harley - Minas Gerais
- Hyptidendron conspersum (Benth.) Harley - Bahia
- Hyptidendron dictiocalyx (Benth.) Harley - Goiás
- Hyptidendron dorothyanum Antar & Harley
- Hyptidendron eximium (Epling) Harley & J.F.B.Pastore - Mato Grosso
- Hyptidendron glutinosum (Benth.) Harley - Brazil, Bolivia
- Hyptidendron leucophyllum (Pohl ex Benth.) Harley - southern Brazil
- Hyptidendron pulcherrimum Antar & Harley Antar & Harley
- Hyptidendron rhabdocalyx (Mart. ex Benth.) Harley - southern Brazil
- Hyptidendron roseum Antar, Harley & J.F.B.Pastore
- Hyptidendron rondonicum (Harley) Harley - Brazil
- Hyptidendron unilaterale (Epling) Harley - southern Brazil
- Hyptidendron vauthieri (Briq.) Harley - southern Brazil
- Hyptidendron vepretorum (Mart. ex Benth.) Harley - Minas Gerais
