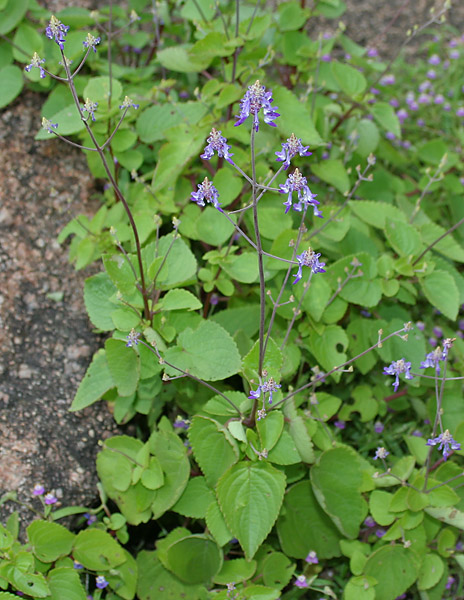
- Anisochilus carnosus

Scientific classification
- Kingdom: Plantae
- Clade: Tracheophytes
- Clade: Angiosperms
- Clade: Eudicots
- Clade: Asterids
- Order: Lamiales
- Family: Lamiaceae
- Subfamily: Nepetoideae
- Tribe: Ocimeae
- Genus: Anisochilus; Briq.

Synonyms
- Stiptanthus Briq.

= Anisochilus =

Genus of flowering plants

Anisochilus is a genus in the family Lamiaceae, commonly called as Kapuri first described in 1830. It is native to China, the Indian subcontinent, and Indochina. Has healing properties that deal with treatment for ailments known as gastric ulcer and helps with dermis issues. Anisochilus also has active properties such as camphor, leutiolin, and apigenin. A new hygrine-like compound has been found within the DNA of this plant.

Species

- Anisochilus adenanthus Dalzell & A.Gibson - southern India
- Anisochilus argenteus Gamble - southern India
- Anisochilus cambodianus Murata - Thailand, Cambodia
- Anisochilus carnosus (L.f.) Wall. - India, Sri Lanka, Nepal, Himalayas, Bhutan, Assam, Myanmar, Thailand
- Anisochilus dysophylloides Benth. - Shervarayan Hills in Tamil Nadu
- Anisochilus harmandii Doan ex Suddee & A.J.Paton - Thailand, Laos, Cambodia
- Anisochilus mitis R.A.Clement - eastern Himalayas
- Anisochilus pallidus Wall. - Yunnan, India, Assam, Bangladesh, Laos, Myanmar, Thailand, Vietnam
- Anisochilus paniculatus Benth. - southern India
- Anisochilus plantagineus Hook.f. - southern India
- Anisochilus polystachys Benth. - Nepal, Bhutan, Assam, Bangladesh, eastern Himalayas
- Anisochilus robustus Hook.f. - southern India
- Anisochilus scaber Benth. - southern India
- Anisochilus siamensis Ridl. - Thailand
- Anisochilus suffruticosus Wight - southern India
- Anisochilus velutinus Trimen - Sri Lanka
- Anisochilus wightii Hook.f. - southern India
