= Alvesia =

Scientific classification
- Kingdom: Plantae
- Clade: Tracheophytes
- Clade: Angiosperms
- Clade: Eudicots
- Clade: Asterids
- Order: Lamiales
- Family: Lamiaceae
- Subfamily: Nepetoideae
- Tribe: Ocimeae
- Genus: Alvesia; Welw.

Synonyms
- Plectranthastrum T.C.E.Fr.

Genus of flowering plants

Alvesia is a genus of plants in the family Lamiaceae, first described in 1869. It is native to central Africa.

Species

- Alvesia clerodendroides (T.C.E.Fr.) B.Mathew - Burundi, Tanzania
- Alvesia cylindricalyx (B.Mathew) B.Mathew - Zaïre, Zambia
- Alvesia rosmarinifolia Welw. - Congo-Brazzaville, Zaïre, Zambia Angola
