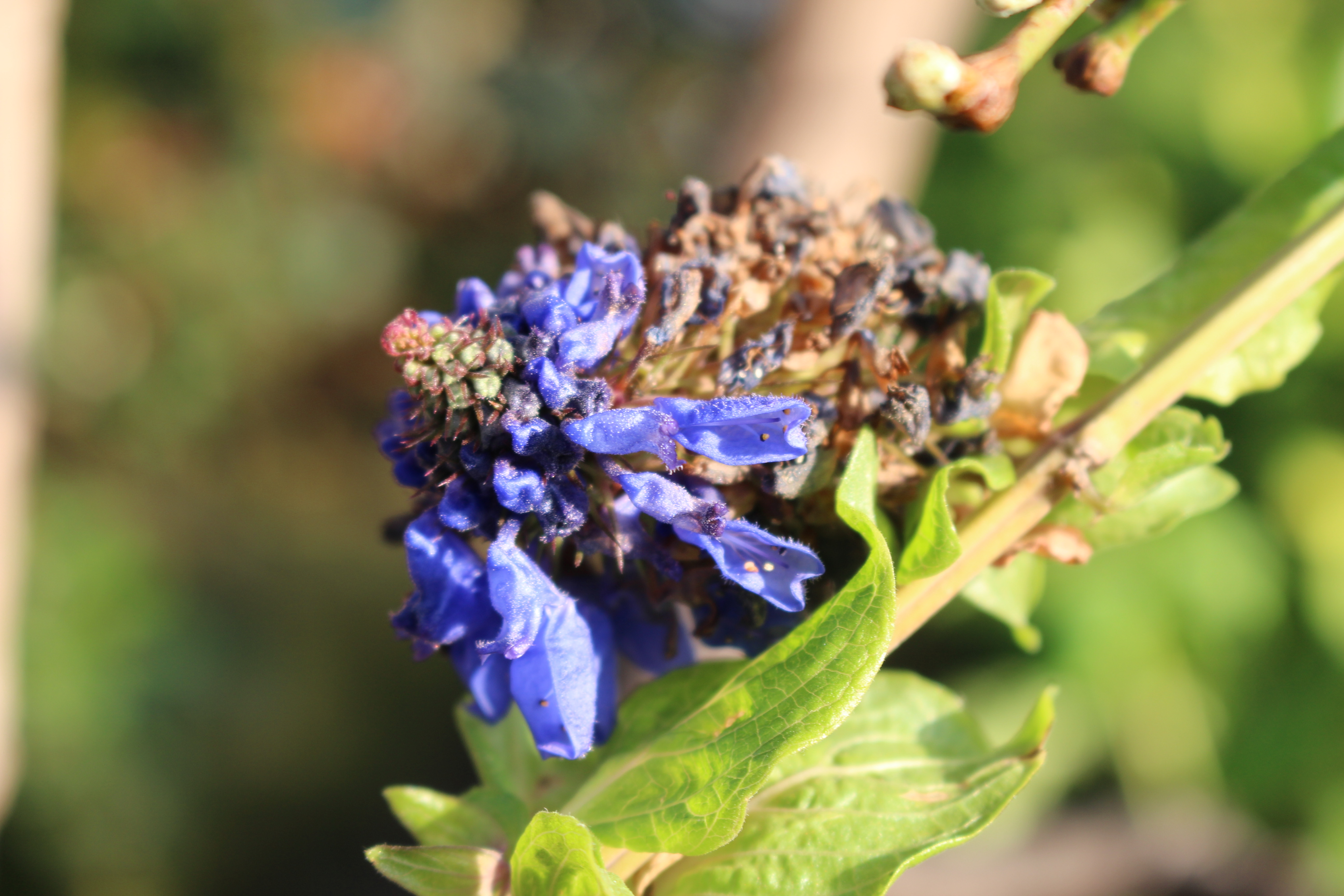
- Pycnostachys urticifolia

Scientific classification
- Kingdom: Plantae
- Clade: Tracheophytes
- Clade: Angiosperms
- Clade: Eudicots
- Clade: Asterids
- Order: Lamiales
- Family: Lamiaceae
- Subfamily: Nepetoideae
- Tribe: Ocimeae
- Genus: Pycnostachys; Hook.

Synonyms
- Echinostachys E.Mey.

= Pycnostachys =

Genus of flowering plants

Pycnostachys is a genus of plants in the family Lamiaceae, first described in 1826. It is native to sub-Saharan Africa including Madagascar.

Species

1. Pycnostachys abyssinica Fresen. - Ethiopia
2. Pycnostachys angolensis G.Taylor - Angola
3. Pycnostachys batesii Baker - Cameroon, Zaïre, Sudan, Uganda
4. Pycnostachys chevalieri Briq. - Central African Republic
5. Pycnostachys ciliata Bramley - Tanzania, Malawi, Mozambique, Zambia
6. Pycnostachys coerulea Hook. - East Africa from Ethiopia to Botswana; Madagascar
7. Pycnostachys congensis Gürke - Zaïre, Zambia
8. Pycnostachys de-wildemaniana Robyns & Lebrun - East Africa from Burundi to Zimbabwe
9. Pycnostachys deflexifolia Baker - Kenya, Tanzania, Uganda
10. Pycnostachys descampsii Briq. - Zaïre
11. Pycnostachys elliotii S.Moore - Zaïre, Uganda
12. Pycnostachys eminii Gürke - from Cameroon to Ethiopia + Tanzania
13. Pycnostachys erici-rosenii R.E.Fr - Zaïre, Uganda, Burundi, Rwanda
14. Pycnostachys goetzenii Gürke - Zaïre, Uganda, Rwanda
15. Pycnostachys gracilis R.D.Good - Angola
16. Pycnostachys graminifolia Perkins - Tanzania
17. Pycnostachys kassneri De Wild - Zaïre, Zambia, Tanzania
18. Pycnostachys lancifolia Bramley - Tanzania
19. Pycnostachys meyeri Gürke - western + central Africa
20. Pycnostachys nepetifolia Baker - Kenya
21. Pycnostachys niamniamensis Gürke - South Sudan, Kenya, Uganda
22. Pycnostachys orthodonta Gürke - Zimbabwe, Mozambique, Zambia, Tanzania
23. Pycnostachys parvifolia Baker - Zambia, Tanzania, Malawi
24. Pycnostachys prittwitzii Perkins - Zambia, Tanzania
25. Pycnostachys pseudospeciosa Buscal. & Muschl. - Zaïre, Zambia
26. Pycnostachys recurvata Ryding - Ethiopia
27. Pycnostachys reticulata (E.Mey.) Benth. - central + southern Africa
28. Pycnostachys ruandensis De Wild. - east-central Africa
29. Pycnostachys schliebenii Mildbr. - east-central Africa
30. Pycnostachys schweinfurthii Briq - western + central Africa
31. Pycnostachys speciosa Gürke - Kenya, Uganda, Tanzania, Rwanda
32. Pycnostachys sphaerocephala Baker - Zambia, Tanzania, Malawi, Zaïre
33. Pycnostachys stuhlmannii Gürke - central Africa
34. Pycnostachys umbrosa (Vatke) Perkins - Kenya, Tanzania
35. Pycnostachys urticifolia Hook. - southeastern Africa
36. Pycnostachys verticillata Baker - Zambia, Tanzania
