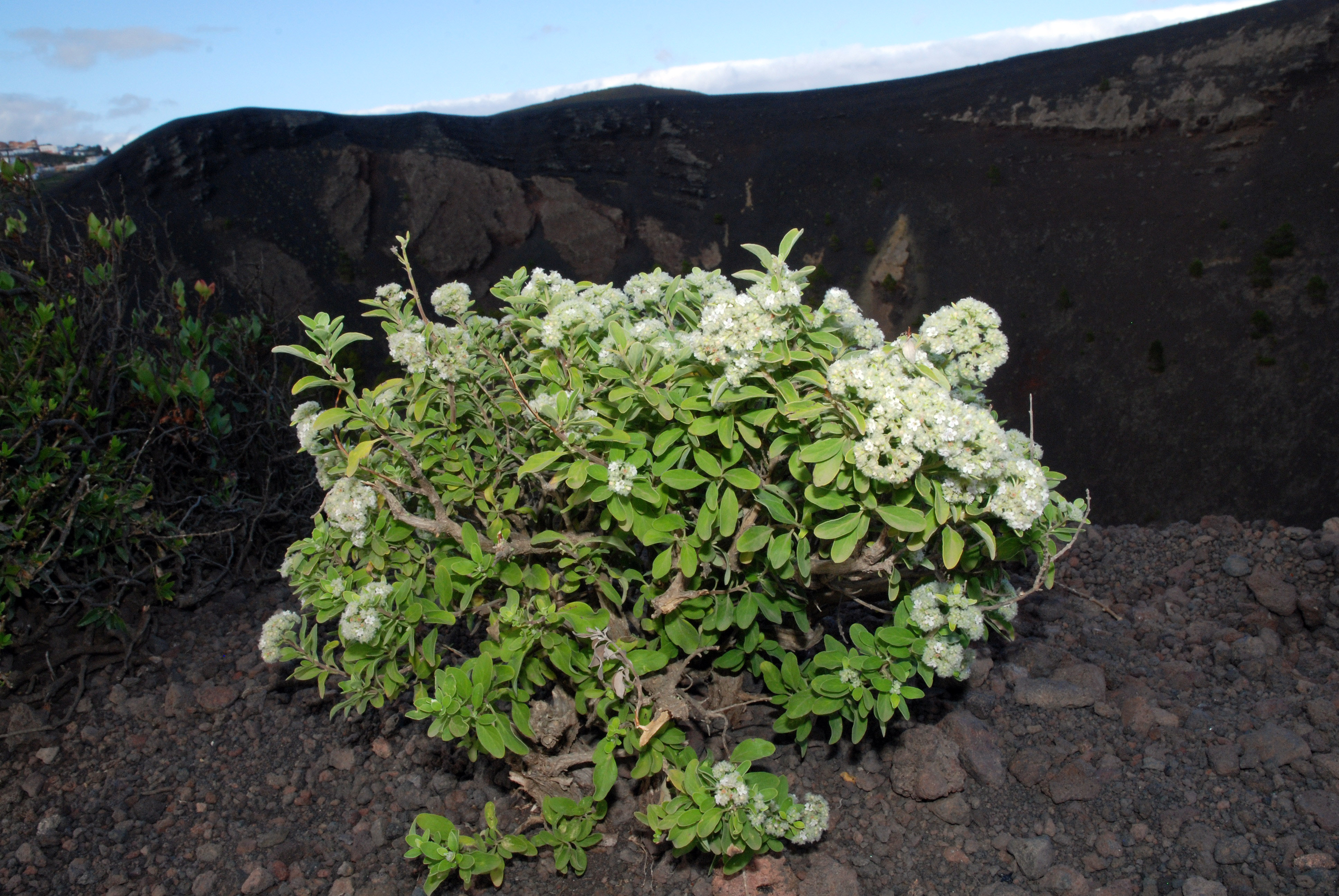
- Bystropogon origanifolius in La Palma

Scientific classification
- Kingdom: Plantae
- Clade: Tracheophytes
- Clade: Angiosperms
- Clade: Eudicots
- Clade: Asterids
- Order: Lamiales
- Family: Lamiaceae
- Subfamily: Nepetoideae
- Tribe: Mentheae
- Genus: Bystropogon; L'Hér.

= Bystropogon =

Genus of flowering plants

Bystropogon is a genus of evergreen shrubs in the family Lamiaceae. It is native to the Canary Islands and Madeira in the eastern Atlantic Ocean. Allied to Ziziphora and Clinopodium acinos, the genus is characterized by tiny flowers in much-branched clusters, with plume-like sepals that elongate at the fruiting stage, giving the whole tip of each branch a fuzzy appearance. Stems are square in cross-section and leaves, arranged in opposite pairs, are aromatic when crushed.

Cultivation The plant prefers mild and dry climates. Grow in very well-drained soil in sunny position. Propagate from seed or cuttings.

== Species ==
Many species names have been proposed for members of this genus, but most of them have been moved to other genera, particularly Clinopodium, Minthostachys, Cuminia, and Mesosphaerum. As currently constituted, the following are recognized in Bystropogon

1. Bystropogon × beltraniae La Serna - Tenerife (B. canariensis var. smithianus × B. plumosus)
2. Bystropogon canariensis (L.) L'Hér. - Canary Islands
3. Bystropogon maderensis Webb & Berthel. - Madeira
4. Bystropogon odoratissimus Bolle - Tenerife
5. Bystropogon origanifolius L'Hér. - Canary Islands
6. Bystropogon plumosus (L.f.) L'Hér. - Tenerife
7. Bystropogon punctatus L'Hér. - Madeira
8. Bystropogon × schmitzii (Menezes) Menezes - Ribiero Frio in Madeira (B. maderensis × B. punctatus)
9. Bystropogon × serrulatus Webb & Berthel - Gran Canaria (B. canariensis × B. origanifolium var. canariae)
10. Bystropogon wildpretii La Serna - La Palma in the Canary Islands
