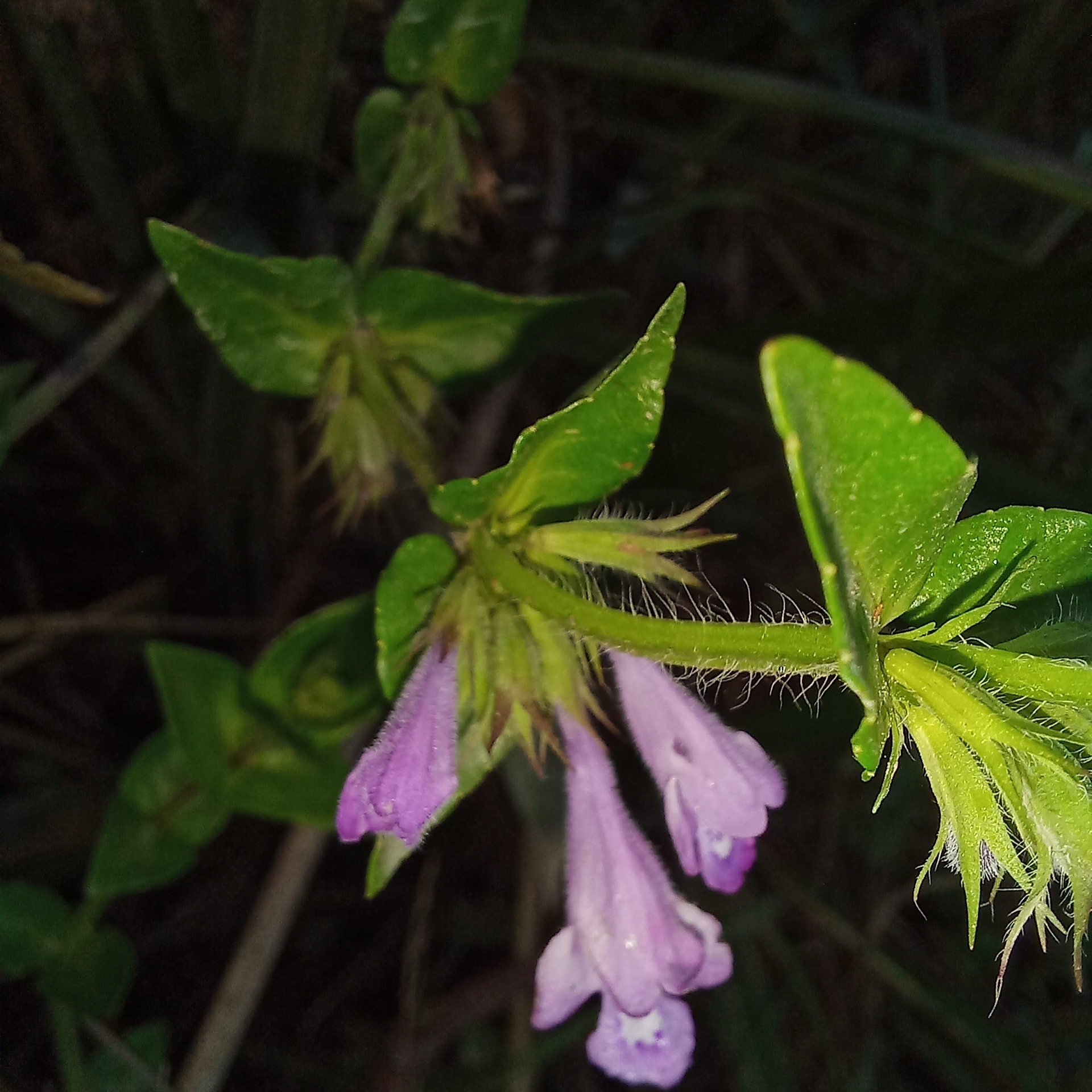
- Hoehnea scutellarioides

Scientific classification
- Kingdom: Plantae
- Clade: Tracheophytes
- Clade: Angiosperms
- Clade: Eudicots
- Clade: Asterids
- Order: Lamiales
- Family: Lamiaceae
- Subfamily: Nepetoideae
- Tribe: Mentheae
- Genus: Hoehnea; Epling

Synonyms
- Keithia Benth. 1834 not Spreng. 1822

= Hoehnea =

Genus of flowering plants

Hoehnea is a genus of plants in the family Lamiaceae, first described with this name in 1939. It is native to South America, primarily southern Brazil and Paraguay.

The genus name of Hoehnea is in honour of Frederico Carlos Hoehne (1882-1959), who was a Brazilian botanist. It was first described in 1939.

Species

- Hoehnea epilobioides (Epling) Epling - Paraguay, southern Brazil
- Hoehnea minima (J.A.Schmidt) Epling - southern Brazil and possibly northern Argentina
- Hoehnea parvula (Epling) Epling - southern Brazil
- Hoehnea scutellarioides (Benth.) Epling - southern Brazil
