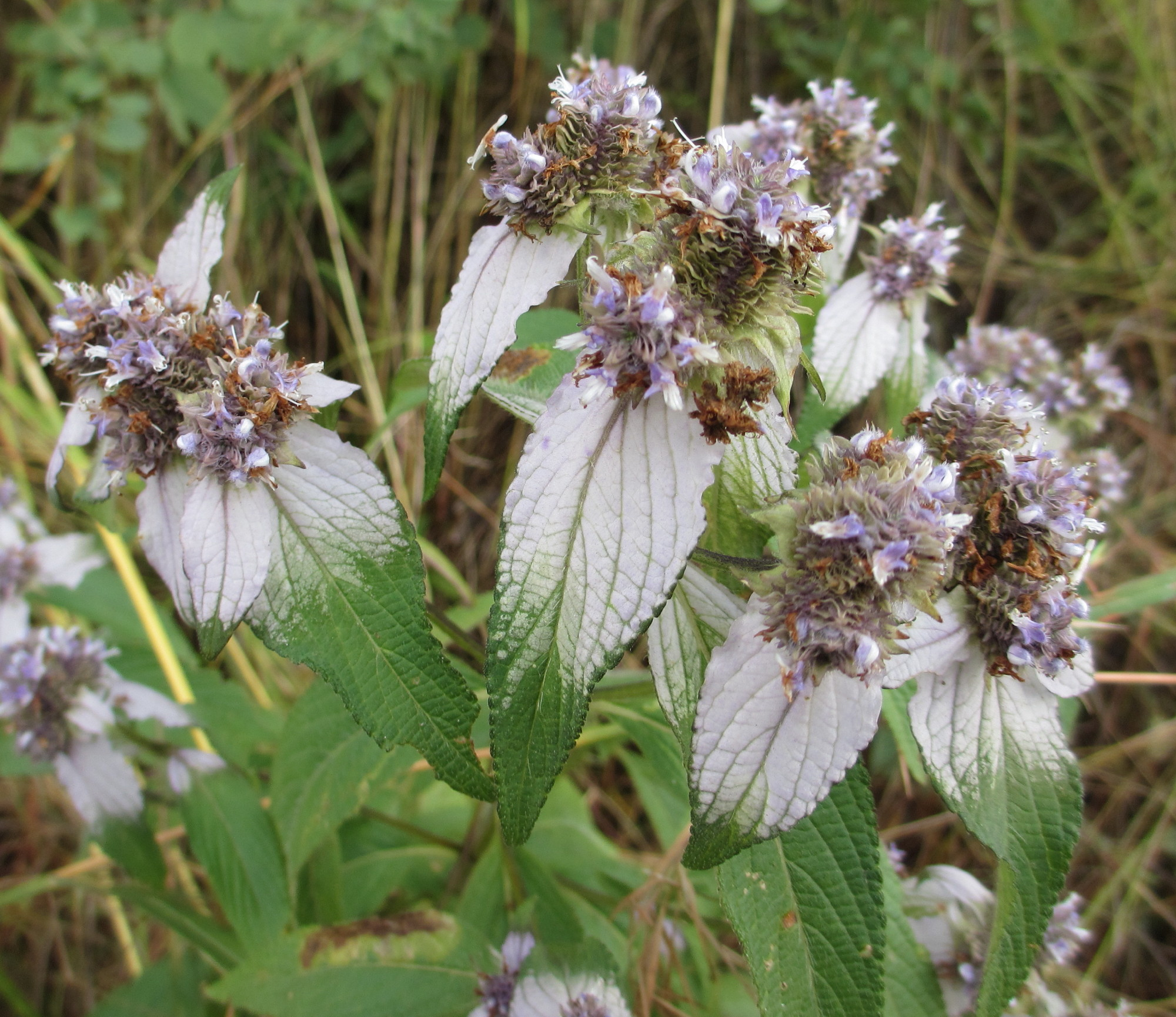
- Haumaniastrum villosum

Scientific classification
- Kingdom: Plantae
- Clade: Tracheophytes
- Clade: Angiosperms
- Clade: Eudicots
- Clade: Asterids
- Order: Lamiales
- Family: Lamiaceae
- Subfamily: Nepetoideae
- Tribe: Ocimeae
- Genus: Haumaniastrum; P.A.Duvign. & Plancke

= Haumaniastrum =

Genus of flowering plants

Haumaniastrum is a genus of flowering plants in the mint family, Lamiaceae, first described in 1959. The species are native to Africa (including Madagascar).

Species

- Haumaniastrum alboviride (Hutch.) P.A.Duvign. & Plancke - Ghana, Nigeria, Cameroon, Chad
- Haumaniastrum bianense A.J.Paton - Zaïre
- Haumaniastrum buettneri (Gürke) J.K.Morton - central + western Africa from Zaïre to Sierra Leone
- Haumaniastrum caeruleum (Oliv.) P.A.Duvign. & Plancke - widespread from Senegal to Somalia, south to Malawi
- Haumaniastrum chartaceum A.J.Paton - Zaïre
- Haumaniastrum cordigerum P.A.Duvign. & Plancke - Zaïre
- Haumaniastrum coriaceum (Robyns & Lebrun) A.J.Paton - Zaïre, Burundi, Tanzania, Zambia, Malawi
- Haumaniastrum cubanquense (R.D.Good) A.J.Paton - Angola
- Haumaniastrum dissitifolium (Baker) A.J.Paton - western Africa from Burundi to Zimbabwe
- Haumaniastrum glabrifolium A.J.Paton - Zambia
- Haumaniastrum graminifolium (Robyns) A.J.Paton - Kibara Plateau in Zaïre
- Haumaniastrum kaessneri (S.Moore) P.A.Duvign. & Plancke - Zaïre
- Haumaniastrum katangense (S.Moore) P.A.Duvign. & Plancke - Zaïre, Tanzania, Angola, Zambia
- Haumaniastrum lantanoides (S.Moore) P.A.Duvign. & Plancke - Zaïre, Malawi, Angola, Zambia
- Haumaniastrum linearifolium (De Wild.) P.A.Duvign. & Plancke - Zaïre, Zambia
- Haumaniastrum membranaceum A.J.Paton - Angola
- Haumaniastrum minor (Briq.) A.J.Paton - Angola, Zambia
- Haumaniastrum morumbense (De Wild.) A.J.Paton - Zaïre
- Haumaniastrum paniculatum (Briq.) A.J.Paton - Zaïre, Angola, Cabinda
- Haumaniastrum polyneurum (S.Moore) P.A.Duvign. & Plancke - Zaïre
- Haumaniastrum praealtum (Briq.) P.A.Duvign. & Plancke - Zaïre, Tanzania, Angola, Zambia
- Haumaniastrum robertii (Robyns) P.A.Duvign. & Plancke - Zaïre
- Haumaniastrum rosulatum (De Wild.) P.A.Duvign. & Plancke - Zaïre
- Haumaniastrum rupestre (R.E.Fr.) A.J.Paton - Zaïre, Zambia
- Haumaniastrum semilignosum (P.A.Duvign. & Plancke) P.A.Duvign. & Plancke - Zaïre
- Haumaniastrum sericeum (Briq.) A.J.Paton - Congo-Brazzaville, Zaïre, Angola, Zambia, Mozambique, Zimbabwe, Namibia
- Haumaniastrum speciosum (E.A.Bruce) A.J.Paton - Tanzania, Zambia
- Haumaniastrum stanneum A.J.Paton - Zaïre
- Haumaniastrum suberosum (Robyns & Lebrun) P.A.Duvign. & Plancke - Zaïre, Zambia, Mozambique, Tanzania
- Haumaniastrum timpermanii (P.A.Duvign. & Plancke) P.A.Duvign. & Plancke - Zaïre
- Haumaniastrum triramosum (N.E.Br.) A.J.Paton - Angola
- Haumaniastrum uniflorum A.J.Paton - Tanzania
- Haumaniastrum vandenbrandei (P.A.Duvign. & Plancke) P.A.Duvign. & Plancke - Zaïre
- Haumaniastrum venosum (Baker) Agnew - Uganda, Kenya, Zaïre, Zambia, Mozambique, Tanzania, Malawi, Zimbabwe
- Haumaniastrum villosum (Benth.) A.J.Paton - Madagascar, from Ethiopia west to Nigeria and south to Zimbabwe*
