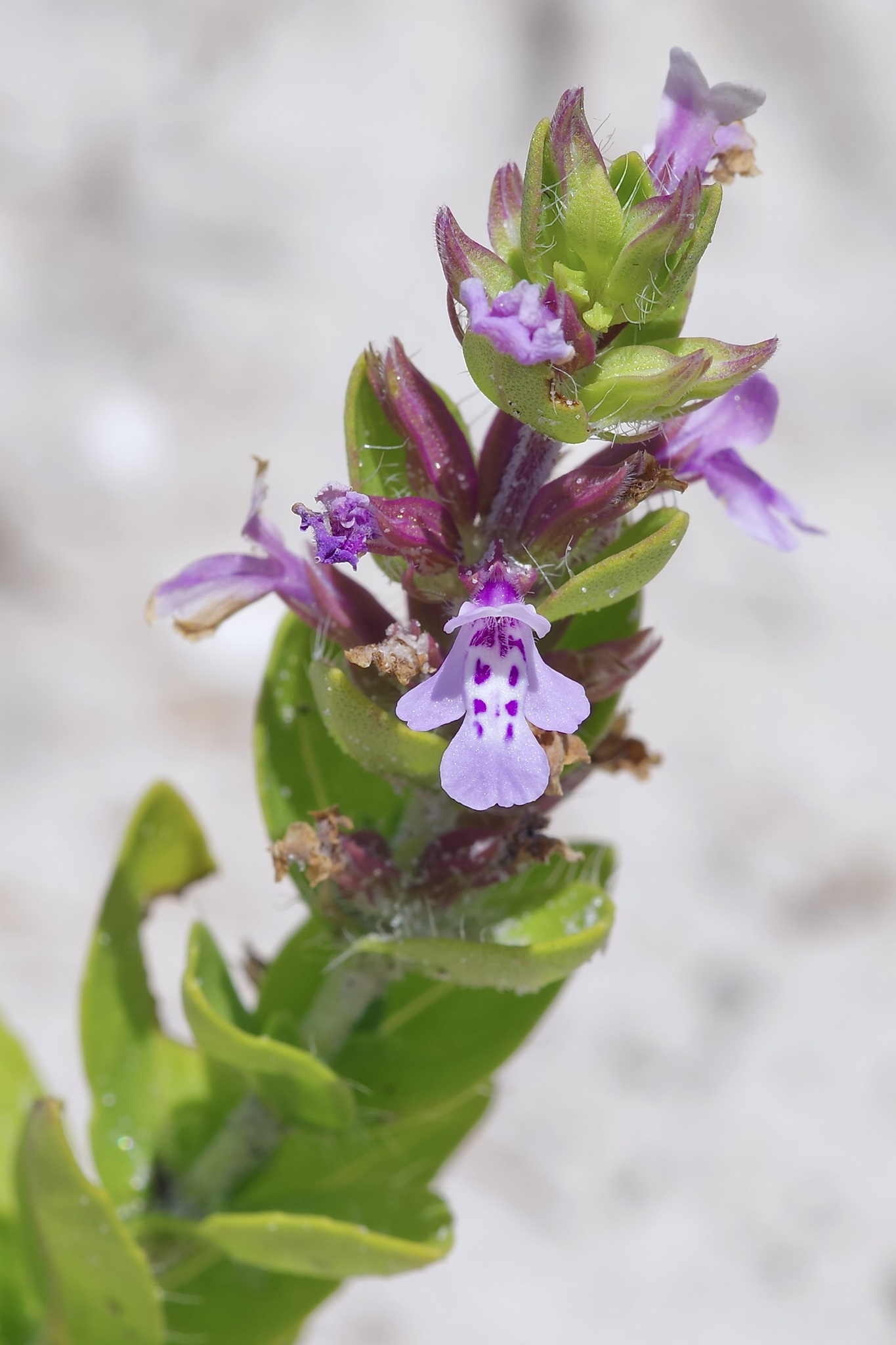
- Rhododon angulatus

Scientific classification
- Kingdom: Plantae
- Clade: Tracheophytes
- Clade: Angiosperms
- Clade: Eudicots
- Clade: Asterids
- Order: Lamiales
- Family: Lamiaceae
- Subfamily: Nepetoideae
- Tribe: Mentheae
- Genus: Rhododon; Epling

= Rhododon =

Genus of flowering plants

Rhododon, commonly referred to as sandmint, is a genus of flowering plant in the mint family (Lamiaceae) first described in 1939. It contains two known species, Rhododon ciliatus (Texas sandmint) and Rhododon angulatus (angled sandmint) Both species are endemic to the state of Texas in the United States.
