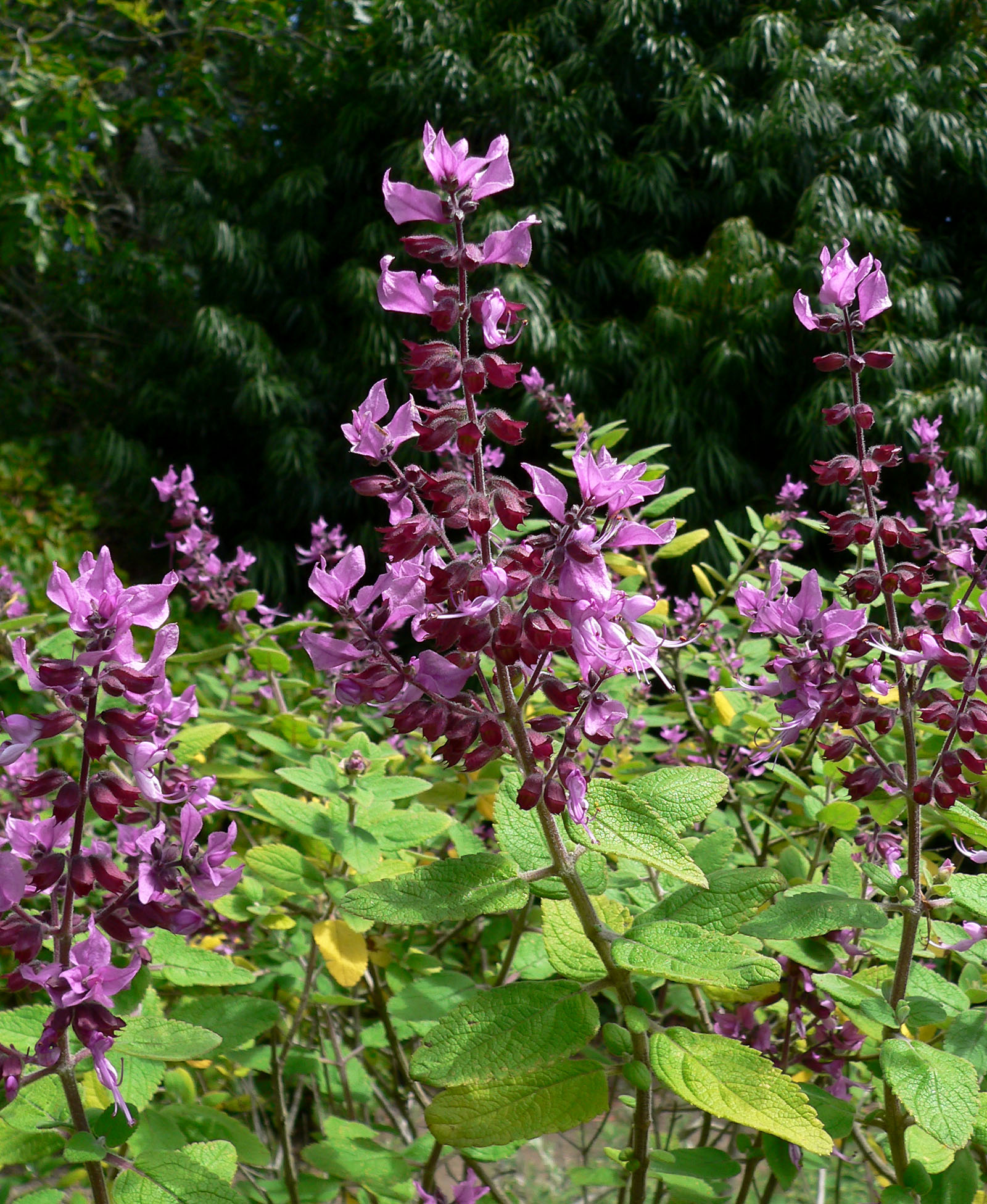
- Syncolostemon obermeyerae

Scientific classification
- Kingdom: Plantae
- Clade: Tracheophytes
- Clade: Angiosperms
- Clade: Eudicots
- Clade: Asterids
- Order: Lamiales
- Family: Lamiaceae
- Subfamily: Nepetoideae
- Tribe: Ocimeae
- Genus: Syncolostemon; E.Mey. ex Benth.

Synonyms
- Hemizygia (Benth.) Briq.; Bouetia A.Chev.

= Syncolostemon =

Genus of flowering plants

Syncolostemon (sagebushes) is a genus of plants in the family Lamiaceae, first described in 1838. It is native primarily to South Africa, with some species in other parts of sub-Saharan Africa (including Madagascar), plus one species in India.

Species

1. Syncolostemon albiflorus (N.E.Br.) D.F.Otieno - Transvaal, Eswatini
2. Syncolostemon argenteus N.E.Br. - KwaZulu-Natal
3. Syncolostemon bolusii (N.E.Br.) D.F.Otieno - KwaZulu-Natal
4. Syncolostemon bracteosus (Benth.) D.F.Otieno - widespread across much of sub-Saharan Africa
5. Syncolostemon canescens (Gürke) D.F.Otieno - Angola, Botswana, Zimbabwe, Eswatini, South Africa
6. Syncolostemon cinereum (Codd) D.F.Otieno & Retief - South Africa
7. Syncolostemon comosus (Wight ex Benth.) D.F.Otieno - southern India
8. Syncolostemon comptonii Codd - Eswatini
9. Syncolostemon concinnus N.E.Br. - Eswatini, South Africa
10. Syncolostemon densiflorus Benth. - South Africa
11. Syncolostemon elliottii (Baker) D.F.Otieno - Zimbabwe, Botswana, Transvaal
12. Syncolostemon eriocephalus Verd. - Northern Province of South Africa
13. Syncolostemon flabellifolius (S.Moore) A.J.Paton - Chimanimani Mountains of Mozambique + Zimbabwe
14. Syncolostemon floccosus (Launert) D.F.Otieno - Namibia
15. Syncolostemon foliosus (S.Moore) D.F.Otieno - Eswatini, South Africa
16. Syncolostemon gerrardii (N.E.Br.) D.F.Otieno - South Africa
17. Syncolostemon incanus (Codd) D.F.Otieno - Northern Province of South Africa
18. Syncolostemon latidens (N.E.Br.) Codd - KwaZulu-Natal
19. Syncolostemon linearis (Benth.) D.F.Otieno - Zimbabwe
20. Syncolostemon macranthus (Gürke) Ashby - Drakensberg Mountains in South Africa
21. Syncolostemon macrophyllus Gürke - South Africa
22. Syncolostemon madagascariensis (A.J.Paton & Hedge) D.F.Otieno - Madagascar
23. Syncolostemon modestus (Codd) D.F.Otieno - Eswatini, South Africa
24. Syncolostemon namapaensis D.F.Otieno - Mozambique, Tanzania
25. Syncolostemon obermeyerae (M.Ashby) D.F.Otieno - Northern Province of South Africa
26. Syncolostemon oritrephes (Wild) D.F.Otieno - Chimanimani Mountains of Mozambique + Zimbabwe
27. Syncolostemon ornatus (S.Moore) D.F.Otieno - Chimanimani Mountains of Zimbabwe
28. Syncolostemon parviflorus E.Mey. ex Benth. - Eswatini, South Africa
29. Syncolostemon parvifolius (Codd) D.F.Otieno - Northern Province of South Africa
30. Syncolostemon persimilis (N.E.Br.) D.F.Otieno - Northern Province of South Africa
31. Syncolostemon petiolatus (Ashby) D.F.Otieno - Eswatini, South Africa, Mozambique
32. Syncolostemon pretoriae (Gürke) D.F.Otieno - Eswatini, South Africa
33. Syncolostemon punctatus (Codd) D.F.Otieno - Northern Province of South Africa
34. Syncolostemon ramosus (Codd) D.F.Otieno - KwaZulu-Natal
35. Syncolostemon ramulosus E.Mey. ex Benth. - KwaZulu-Natal, Cape Province
36. Syncolostemon rehmannii (Gürke) D.F.Otieno - Northern Province of South Africa
37. Syncolostemon rotundifolius E.Mey. ex Benth. - KwaZulu-Natal, Cape Province
38. Syncolostemon rugosifolius (M.Ashby) D.F.Otieno - Northern Province of South Africa
39. Syncolostemon stalmansii (A.J.Paton & K.Balkwill) D.F.Otieno - Mpumalanga, Eswatini
40. Syncolostemon stenophyllus (Gürke) D.F.Otieno - KwaZulu-Natal, Cape Province
41. Syncolostemon subvelutinus (Gürke) D.F.Otieno - Northern Province of South Africa
42. Syncolostemon teucriifolius (Hochst.) D.F.Otieno - Mozambique, Zimbabwe, South Africa
43. Syncolostemon thorncroftii (N.E.Br.) D.F.Otieno - Northern Province of South Africa
44. Syncolostemon transvaalensis (Schltr.) D.F.Otieno - Northern Province of South Africa
45. Syncolostemon welwitschii (Rolfe) D.F.Otieno - Nigeria, Cameroon, Central African Republic, Zaire, Tanzania, Zambia, Angola
