= Fuerstia =

Scientific classification
- Kingdom: Plantae
- Clade: Tracheophytes
- Clade: Angiosperms
- Clade: Eudicots
- Clade: Asterids
- Order: Lamiales
- Family: Lamiaceae
- Subfamily: Nepetoideae
- Tribe: Ocimeae
- Genus: Fuerstia; T.C.E.Fr.

Genus of flowering plants

Fuerstia is a genus of plants in the family Lamiaceae, first described in 1929. It is native to Eastern and Southern Africa.

Species

- Fuerstia adpressa A.J.Paton - Angola
- Fuerstia africana T.C.E.Fr. - East Africa (Ethiopia, Rwanda, Somalia, Kenya, Uganda, Tanzania)
- Fuerstia angustifolia G.Taylor - Tanzania, Angola, Malawi, Zambia
- Fuerstia bartsioides (Baker) G.Taylor - South Sudan
- Fuerstia dendrothrix A.J.Paton - Somalia
- Fuerstia rara G.Taylor - Angola
- Fuerstia rigida (Benth.) A.J.Paton - Angola
- Fuerstia ternata A.J.Paton - Tanzania
- Fuerstia welwitschii G.Taylor - Angola
