= Eriopidion =

Scientific classification
- Kingdom: Plantae
- Clade: Tracheophytes
- Clade: Angiosperms
- Clade: Eudicots
- Clade: Asterids
- Order: Lamiales
- Family: Lamiaceae
- Subfamily: Nepetoideae
- Tribe: Ocimeae
- Genus: Eriopidion (Benth.) Harley
- Species: E. strictum

Binomial name
- Eriopidion strictum (Benth.) Harley

Synonyms
- Eriope stricta Benth.

Genus of plants

Eriopidion is a genus of flowering plant in the family Lamiaceae, first described as a genus in 1976. It contains only one known species, Eriopidion strictum. It is native to Venezuela and Brazil.
