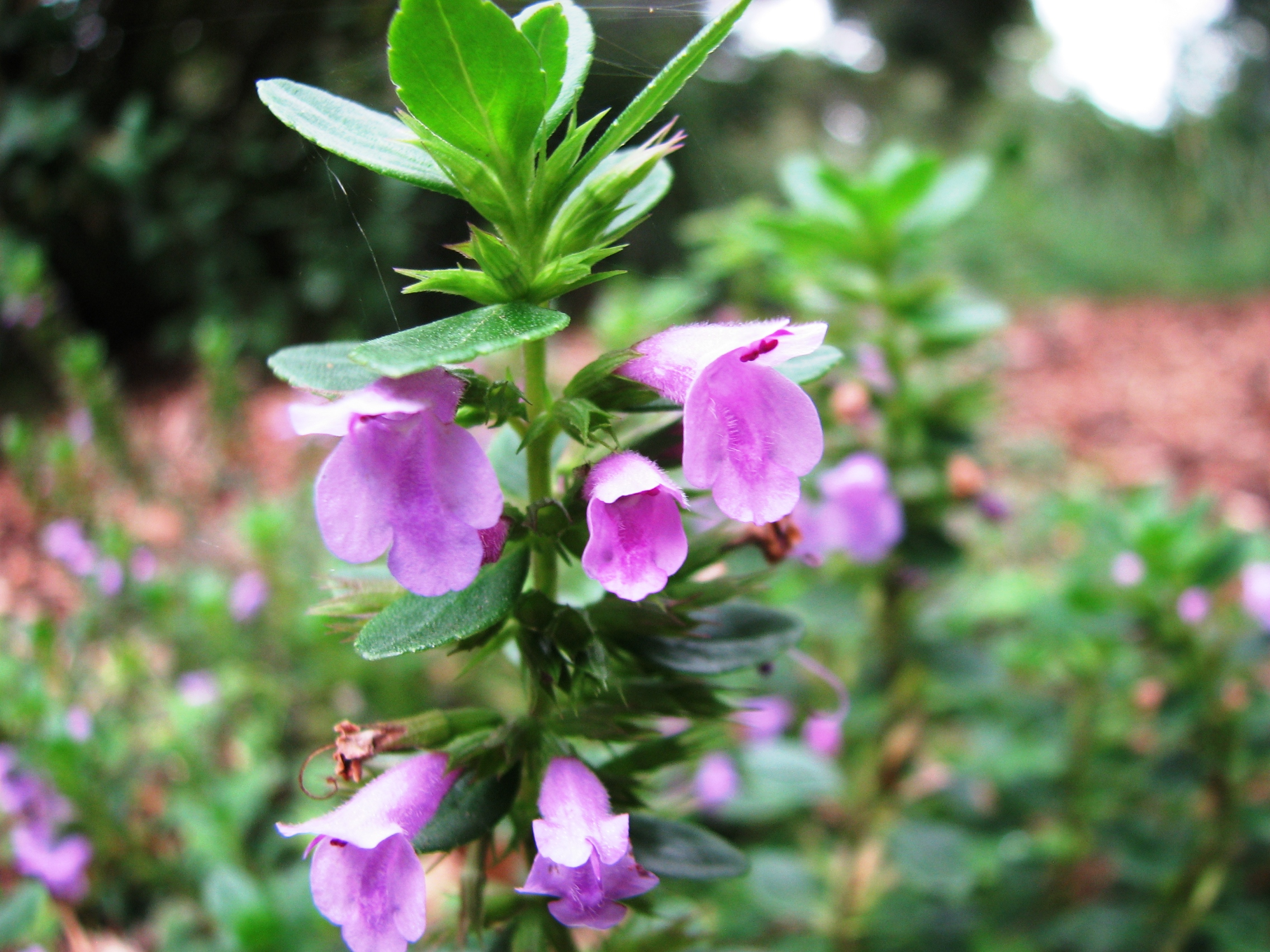
- Hesperozygis dimidiata

Scientific classification
- Kingdom: Plantae
- Clade: Tracheophytes
- Clade: Angiosperms
- Clade: Eudicots
- Clade: Asterids
- Order: Lamiales
- Family: Lamiaceae
- Subfamily: Nepetoideae
- Tribe: Mentheae
- Genus: Hesperozygis; Epling

= Hesperozygis =

Genus of flowering plants

Hesperozygis is a genus of shrubs or subshrubs in the family Lamiaceae. The species are all endemic to southern and southeastern Brazil.

== Species ==
1. Hesperozygis dimidiata Epling & Mathias
2. Hesperozygis kleinii Epling & Játiva
3. Hesperozygis myrtoides (A.St.-Hil. ex Benth.) Epling
4. Hesperozygis nitida (Benth.) Epling
5. Hesperozygis rhododon Epling
6. Hesperozygis ringens (Benth.) Epling
7. Hesperozygis spathulata Epling

== Cultivation ==
Several hybrids are in cultivation. Hesperozygis hybrida×Satureja hybrida as Hesperozygis 'Sunrise Mojito' and Hesperozygis kleinii×(H. myrtoides×H. dimidiata) as Hesperozygis 'Midnight Mojito'.
