= Glechon =

Scientific classification
- Kingdom: Plantae
- Clade: Tracheophytes
- Clade: Angiosperms
- Clade: Eudicots
- Clade: Asterids
- Order: Lamiales
- Family: Lamiaceae
- Subfamily: Nepetoideae
- Tribe: Mentheae
- Genus: Glechon; Spreng.

Genus of flowering plants

Glechon is a genus of flowering plants in the mint family, Lamiaceae, first described in 1827. It is native to South America.

Species

- Glechon ciliata Benth. - southern Brazil, northern Argentina, Paraguay, Uruguay
- Glechon discolor Epling - southern Brazil
- Glechon elliptica C.Pereira & Hatschbach - Paraná
- Glechon hoehneana Epling - southern Brazil
- Glechon marifolia Benth. - southern Brazil, Misiones Province of Argentina, Paraguay, Uruguay
- Glechon spathulata Benth. - southern Brazil, Misiones Province of Argentina
- Glechon thymoides Spreng. - southern Brazil, Misiones Province of Argentina, Uruguay
