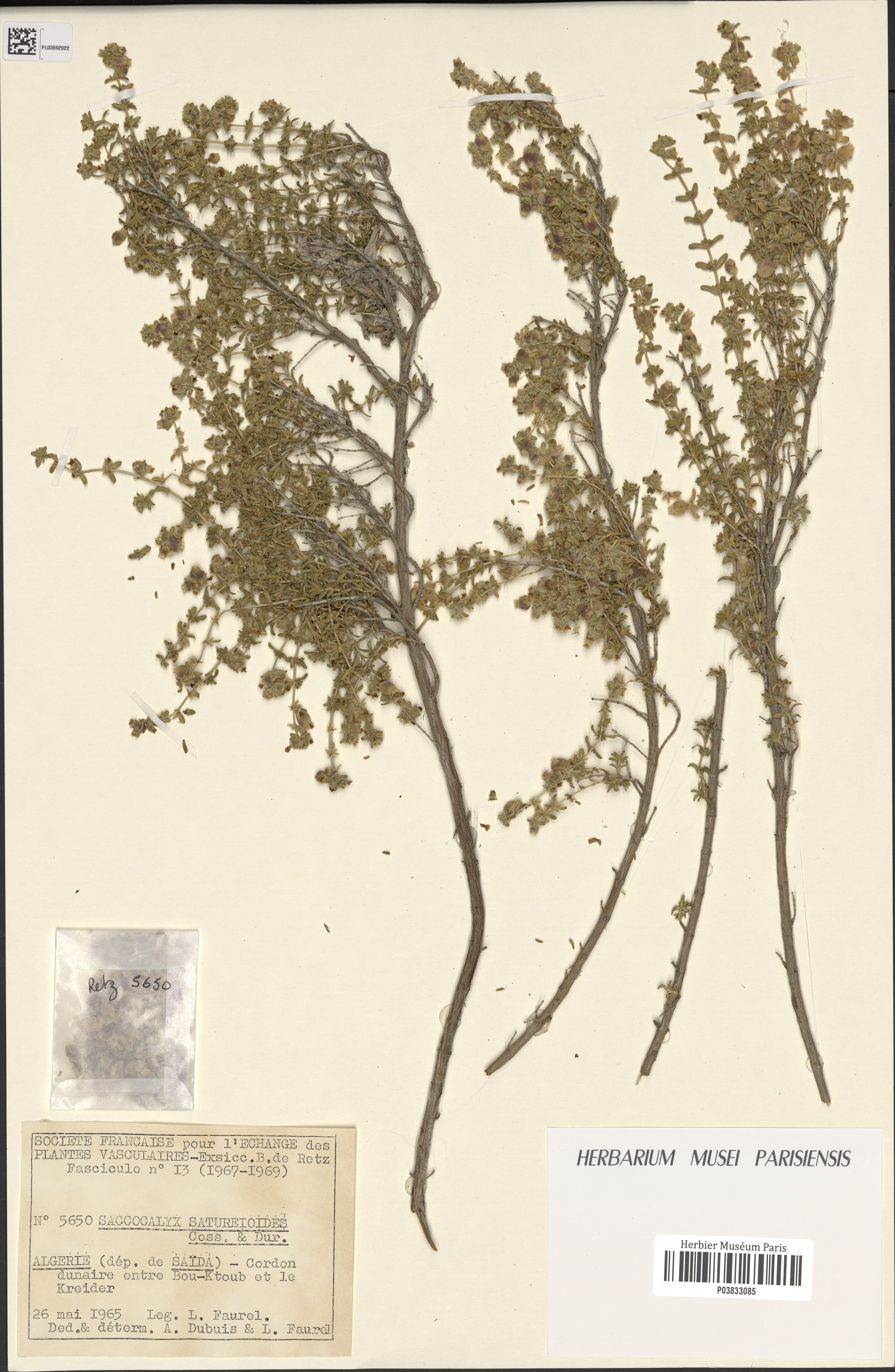

Scientific classification
- Kingdom: Plantae
- Clade: Tracheophytes
- Clade: Angiosperms
- Clade: Eudicots
- Clade: Asterids
- Order: Lamiales
- Family: Lamiaceae
- Subfamily: Nepetoideae
- Tribe: Mentheae
- Genus: Saccocalyx; Coss. & Durieu
- Species: S. saturejoides

Binomial name
- Saccocalyx saturejoides Coss. & Durieu

Synonyms
- Genus synonymy: Faustia Font Quer & Rothm; Species synonymy: Faustia saturejoides (Coss. & Durieu) Font Quer & Rothm.

= Saccocalyx saturejoides =

Genus of flowering plants

Saccocalyx is a genus of flowering plant in the family Lamiaceae, first described in 1835. It contains only one known species, Saccocalyx saturejoides, native to Morocco and Algeria.
