= Pentapleura =

Scientific classification
- Kingdom: Plantae
- Clade: Tracheophytes
- Clade: Angiosperms
- Clade: Eudicots
- Clade: Asterids
- Order: Lamiales
- Family: Lamiaceae
- Subfamily: Nepetoideae
- Tribe: Mentheae
- Genus: Pentapleura; Hand.-Mazz.
- Species: P. subulifera

Binomial name
- Pentapleura subulifera Hand.-Mazz.

Genus of flowering plants

Pentapleura is a genus of flowering plant in the family Lamiaceae, first described in 1913. It contains only one known species, Pentapleura subulifera, native to southeastern Turkey and northern Iraq.
