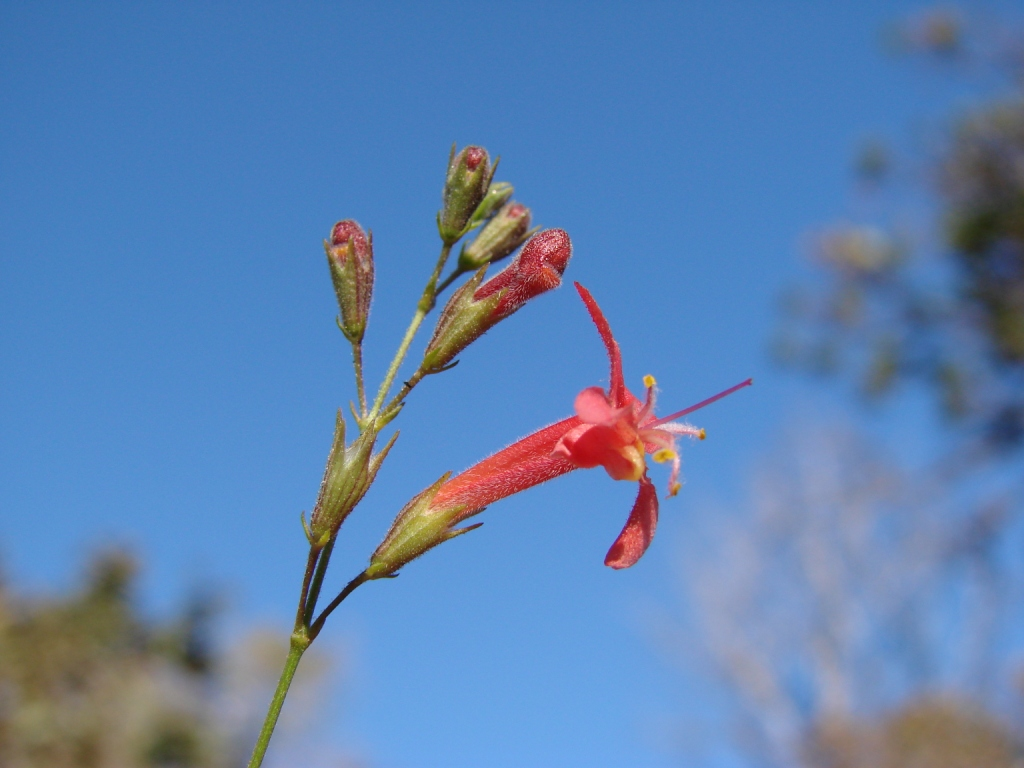
- Hypenia macrantha

Scientific classification
- Kingdom: Plantae
- Clade: Tracheophytes
- Clade: Angiosperms
- Clade: Eudicots
- Clade: Asterids
- Order: Lamiales
- Family: Lamiaceae
- Subfamily: Nepetoideae
- Tribe: Ocimeae
- Genus: Hypenia (Mart. ex Benth.) Harley

= Hypenia =

Genus of flowering plants

Hypenia is a genus of flowering plants in the family Lamiaceae, first described as a genus in 1988. It is native to South America and southern Mexico.

Species

- Hypenia aristulata (Epling) Harley - Goiás
- Hypenia brachystachys (Pohl ex Benth.) Harley - southern Brazil
- Hypenia calycina (Pohl ex Benth.) Harley - Brazil
- Hypenia concinna (Benth.) Harley - Tocantins
- Hypenia crispata (Pohl ex Benth.) Harley - Goiás
- Hypenia densiflora (Pohl ex Benth.) Harley - Brazil
- Hypenia durifolia (Epling) Harley - Brazil
- Hypenia gardneriana (Benth.) Harley - Brazil
- Hypenia glauca (A.St.-Hil. ex Benth.) Harley - Brazil, Paraguay
- Hypenia inelegans (Epling) Harley - Brazil
- Hypenia irregularis (Benth.) Harley - Brazil
- Hypenia macrantha (A.St.-Hil. ex Benth.) Harley - Brazil
- Hypenia macrosiphon (Briq.) Harley - Brazil, Paraguay, Bolivia
- Hypenia marifolia (Benth.) Harley - Brazil
- Hypenia micrantha (Benth.) Harley - Mato Grosso
- Hypenia paniculata (Benth.) Harley - Brazil
- Hypenia paradisi (Harley) Harley - Goiás
- Hypenia pauliana (Epling) Harley - Brazil
- Hypenia perplexa (Epling) Harley - Brazil
- Hypenia pruinosa (Pohl ex Benth.) Harley - Brazil
- Hypenia reticulata (Mart. ex Benth.) Harley - eastern Brazil
- Hypenia salzmannii (Benth.) Harley - Brazil, Guyana, Venezuela
- Hypenia simplex (A.St.-Hil. ex Benth.) Harley & J.F.B.Pastore - Brazil
- Hypenia subrosea (Harley) Harley - Goiás
- Hypenia violacea Mart.Gord. & S.Valencia - Guerrero, Oaxaca
