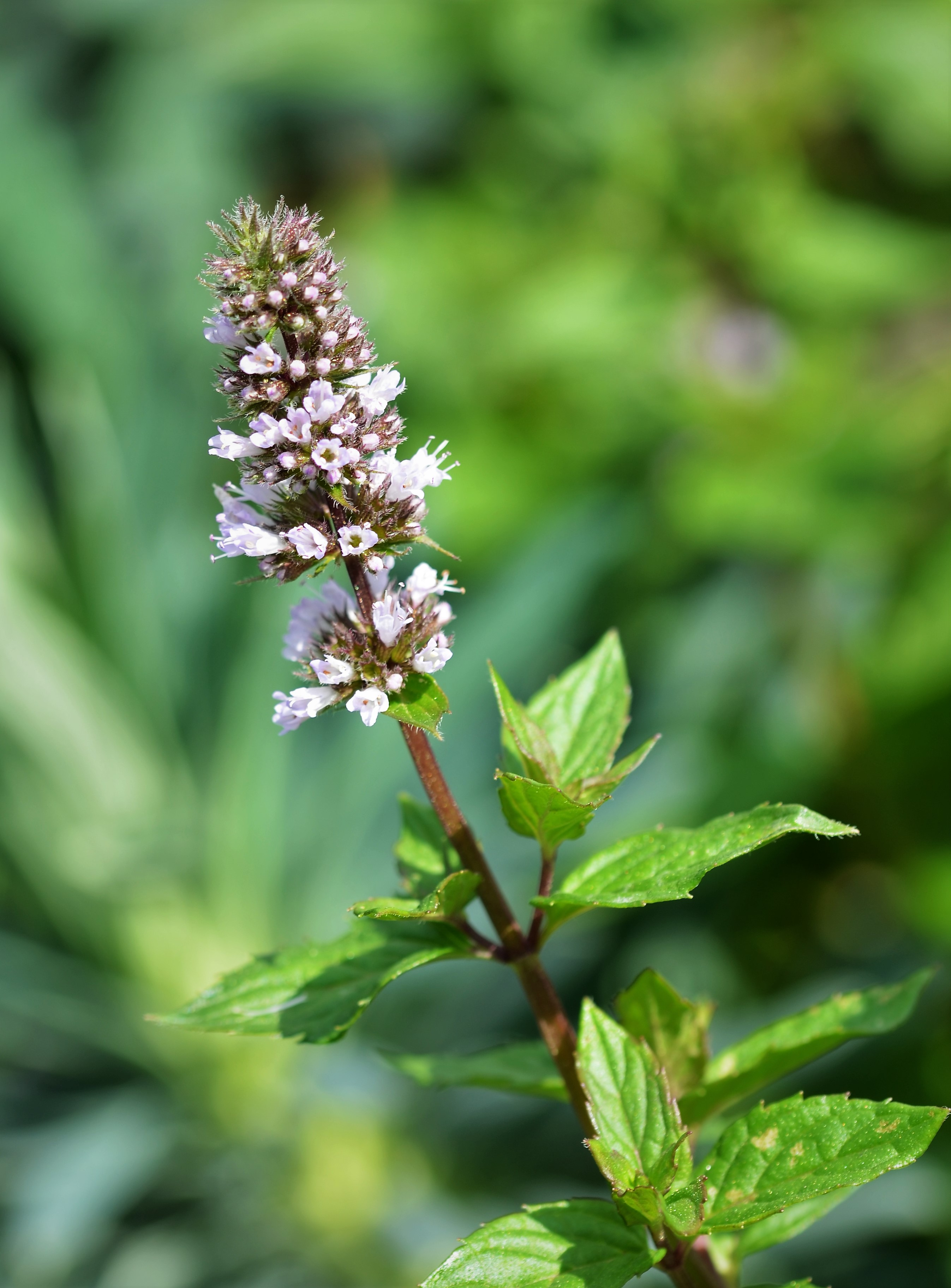
- Mentha suaveolens

Scientific classification
- Kingdom: Plantae
- Clade: Tracheophytes
- Clade: Angiosperms
- Clade: Eudicots
- Clade: Asterids
- Order: Lamiales
- Family: Lamiaceae
- Subfamily: Nepetoideae; Burnett

Tribes
- Elsholtzieae; Mentheae; Ocimeae

= Nepetoideae =

Subfamily of flowering plants in the sage family

Nepetoideae is a subfamily of plants in the family Lamiaceae.

As of July 2020, the Angiosperm Phylogeny Website (APweb) accepted the following genera:

- Acanthomintha (A. Gray) Bentham & J. D. Hooker
- Aeollanthus Sprengel
- Agastache Gronovius
- Alvesia Welwitsch
- Anisochilus Bentham
- Asterohyptis Epling
- Basilicum Moench
- Benguellia G. Taylor
- Blephilia Rafinesque
- Bystropogon L'Héritier
- Cantinoa Harley & J. F. B. Pastore
- Capitanopsis S. Moore
- Catoferia (Bentham) Bentham
- Cedronella Moench
- Cleonia L.
- Clinopodium L.
- Coleus Loureiro
- Collinsonia L.
- Condea Adanson
- Conradina A. Gray
- Cuminia Colla
- Cunila L.
- Cyanocephalus (Bentham) Harley & J. F. B. Pastore
- Cyclotrichium (Boissier) Manden. & Scheng.
- Dicerandra Bentham
- Dracocephalum L.
- Drepanocaryum Pojarkova
- Elsholtzia Willdenow
- Endostemon N. E. Brown
- Eplingiella Harley & J. F. B. Pastore
- Equilabium Mwanyambo et al.
- Eriope Bentham
- Eriopidion Harley
- Eriothymus (Bentham) Schmidt
- Fuerstia T. C. E. Fries
- Glechoma L.
- Glechon Sprengel
- Gontscharovia Boriss.
- Gymneia (Bentham) Harley & J. F. B. Pastore
- Hanceola Kudô
- Haumaniastrum P. A. Duvignaud & Planke
- Hedeoma Persoon
- Hemizygia (Bentham) Briquet (accepted by APweb, but treated as a synonym of Syncolostemon by other sources)
- Hesperozygis Epling
- Heterolamium C. Y. Wu
- Hoehnea Epling
- Horminum L.
- Hoslundia Vahl
- Hypenia (Bentham) Harley
- Hyptidendron Harley
- Hyptis Jacquin
- Hyssopus L.
- Isodon (Bentham) Spach
- Keiskea Miquel (accepted by APweb, but treated as a synonym of Collinsonia by other sources)
- Killickia Bräuchler et al.
- Kurzamra Kuntze
- Lallemantia Fischer & C. A. Meyer
- Lavandula L.
- Lepechinia Willdenow
- Leptohyptis Harley & J. F. B. Pastore
- Lycopus L.
- Madlabium Hedge (treated as a synonym of Capitanopsis S.Moore by APweb, but accepted by other sources)
- Marsypianthes Bentham
- Martianthus Harley & J. F. B. Pastore
- Medusantha Harley & J. F. B. Pastore
- Meehania Britton
- Melissa L.
- Mentha L.
- Mesosphaerum P. Browne
- Micromeria Bentham
- Minthostachys (Bentham) Spach
- Monarda L.
- Monardella Bentham
- Mosla (Bentham) Maximowicz
- Nepeta L.
- Obtegomeria Cantino & Doroszenko
- Ocimum L.
- Ombrocharis Handel-Mazzetti
- Oocephalus (Bentham) Harley & J. F. B. Pastore
- Origanum L.
- Orthosiphon Bentham
- Peltodon Pohl (accepted by APweb, but treated as a synonym of Hyptis by other sources)
- Pentapleura Handel-Mazzetti
- Perilla L.
- Perillula Maximowicz
- Physominthe Harley & J. F. B. Pastore
- Piloblephis Rafinesque
- Platostoma P. Beauvois
- Plectranthus L'Héritier
- Pogogyne Bentham
- Poliomintha A. Gray
- Prunella L.
- Pycnanthemum Michaux
- Pycnostachys Hooker
- Rhabdocaulon (Bentham) Epling
- Rhaphiodon Schauer
- Rhododon Epling
- Saccocalyx Cossone & Durieu
- Salvia L.
- Satureja L.
- Schizonepeta (Bentham) Briquet
- Siphocranion Kudô
- Solenostemon Schumacher (accepted by APweb, but treated as a synonym of Coleus by other sources)
- Stachydeoma Small
- Syncolostemon Bentham
- Tetradenia Bentham
- Thorncroftia N. E. Brown
- Thymbra L.
- Thymus L.
- Zataria Boissier
- Ziziphora L.
