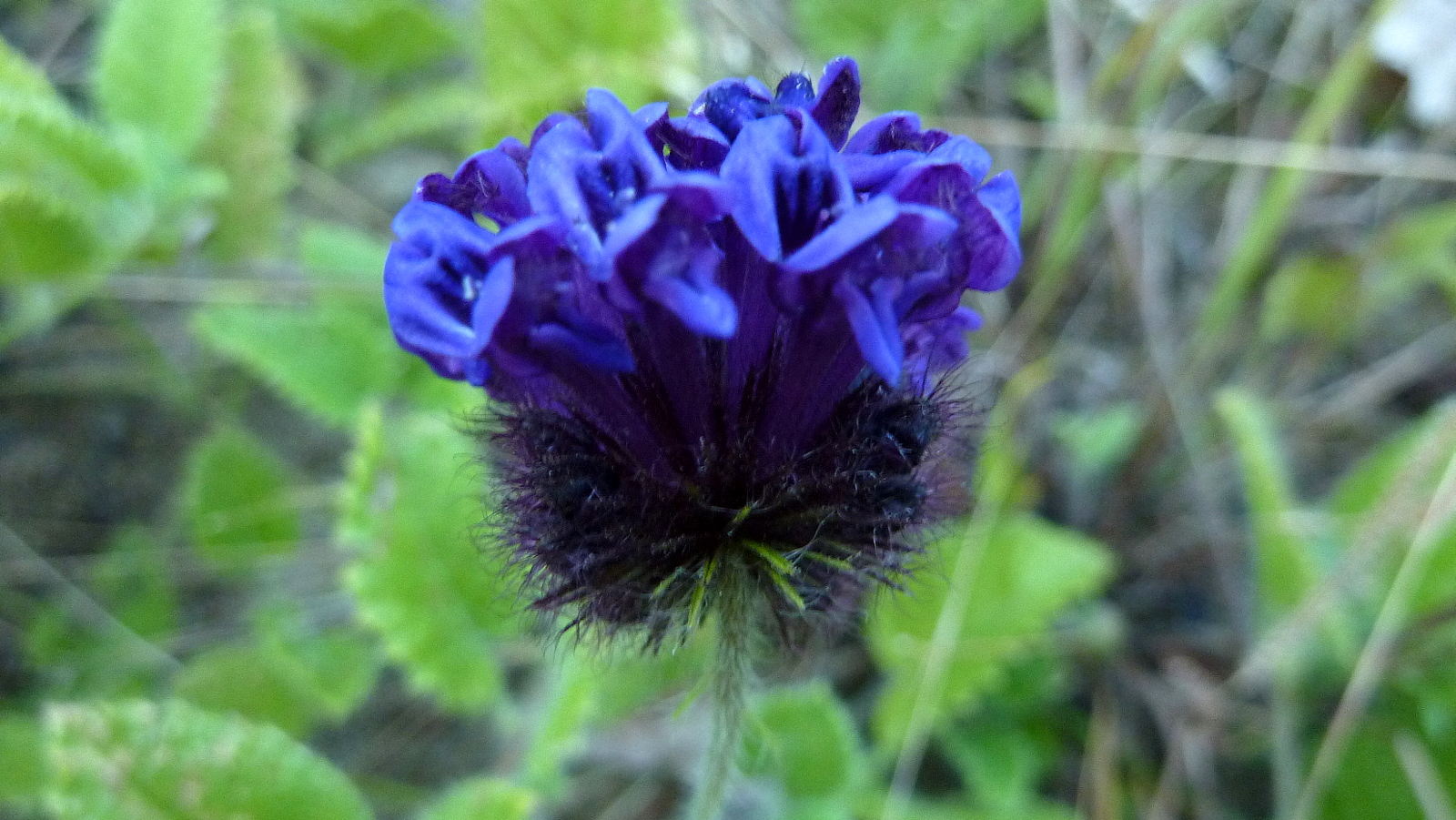

Scientific classification
- Kingdom: Plantae
- Clade: Tracheophytes
- Clade: Angiosperms
- Clade: Eudicots
- Clade: Asterids
- Order: Lamiales
- Family: Lamiaceae
- Subfamily: Nepetoideae
- Tribe: Ocimeae
- Genus: Rhaphiodon; Schauer
- Species: R. echinus

Binomial name
- Rhaphiodon echinus (Nees & Mart.) Schauer

Synonyms
- Raphiodon Benth.; Zappania echinus Nees & Mart.; Lippia echinus (Nees & Mart.) Spreng.; Hyptis sideritis Mart. ex Benth.; Mesosphaerum sideritis (Mart. ex Benth.) Kuntze

= Rhaphiodon echinus =

Species of flowering plant

Rhaphiodon echinus is a species of flowering plant in the family Lamiaceae, endemic to eastern Brazil. It is the only known species in the genus Rhaphiodon, first described as a plant genus in 1844.
