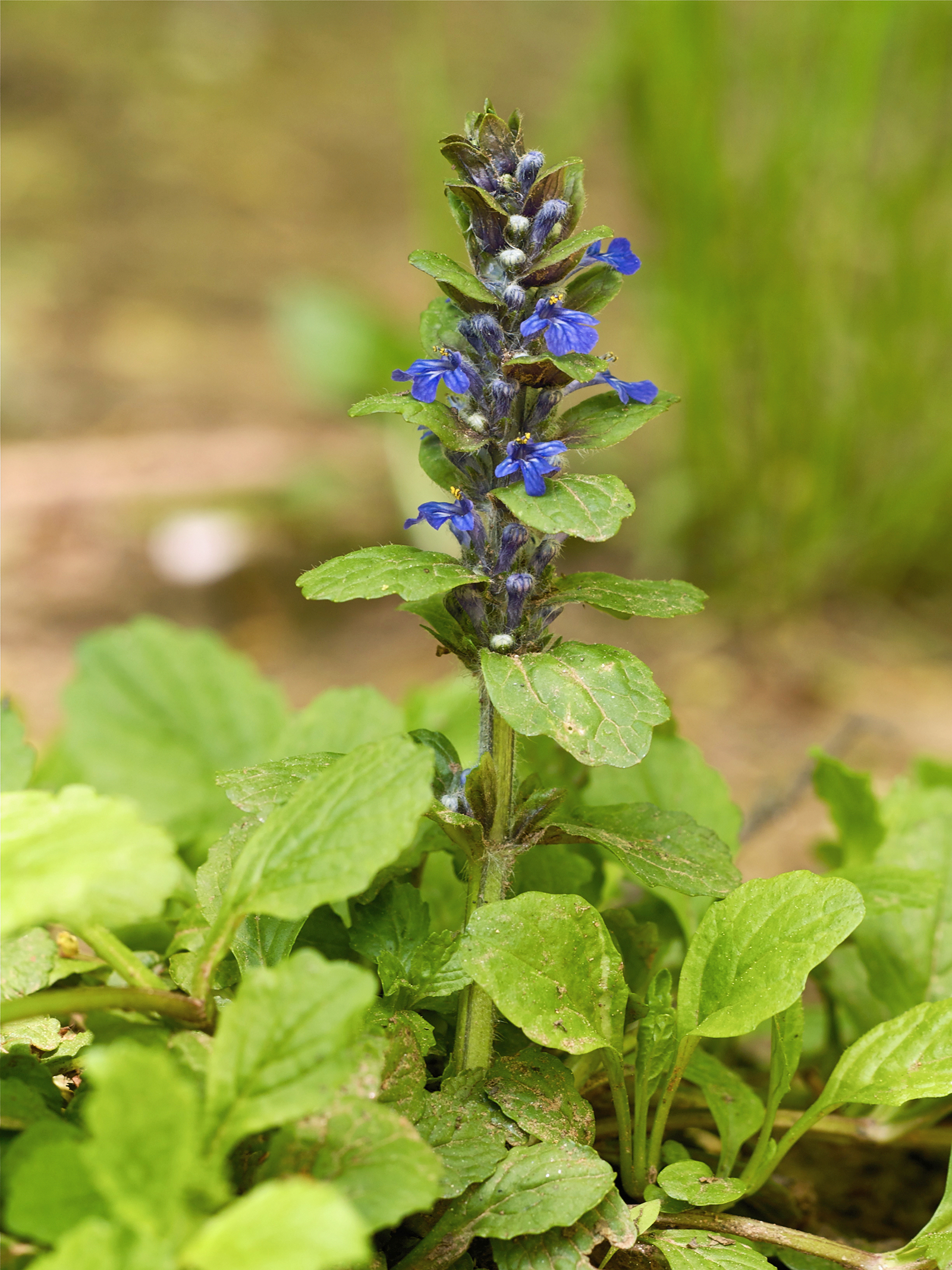
- Ajuga reptans

Scientific classification
- Kingdom: Plantae
- Clade: Tracheophytes
- Clade: Angiosperms
- Clade: Eudicots
- Clade: Asterids
- Order: Lamiales
- Family: Lamiaceae
- Subfamily: Ajugoideae
- Tribe: Ajugeae; Benth.

Genera
- Acrymia Prain; Ajuga L. Cymaria Benth. Garrettia H. R. Fletcher; Holocheila (Kudô) S. Chow

= Ajugeae =

Tribe of flowering plants in the sage family

Ajugeae is a tribe of the subfamily Ajugoideae in the family Lamiaceae. It contains five genera: Acrymia Prain, Ajuga L., Cymaria Benth., Garrettia H. R. Fletcher, and Holocheila (Kudô) S. Chow.
