= Kalaharia =

Kalaharia may refer to:

- Kalahari craton, a geological phenomenon
- Kalaharia (plant), a genus of plants in the family Lamiaceae
