= Shellflower =

Shellflower may refer to:

- Any of several plants in the genus Alpinia; e.g. Alpinia nutans, and Alpinia zerumbet
- Any of several plants in the genus Chelone, e.g. Chelone glabra
- Any of several plants in the genus Moluccella, specially Moluccella laevis
- Any of several plants in the genus Tigridia
- Pistia stratiotes, the sole species in the genus Pistia.
