= Anthocoma =

Anthocoma may refer to:

- Anthocoma (moth), a genus of moths in the subfamily Oecophorinae
- Anthocoma (plant), a genus of plants in the family Lamiaceae
