= Catoferia capitata =

Scientific classification
- Kingdom: Plantae
- Clade: Tracheophytes
- Clade: Angiosperms
- Clade: Eudicots
- Clade: Asterids
- Order: Lamiales
- Family: Lamiaceae
- Genus: Catoferia
- Species: C. capitata

Binomial name
- Catoferia capitata (Benth.) Hemsl.

Species of flowering plant

Catoferia capitata is a species of flowering plant in the family Lamiaceae. It is native to Mexico and Peru.
