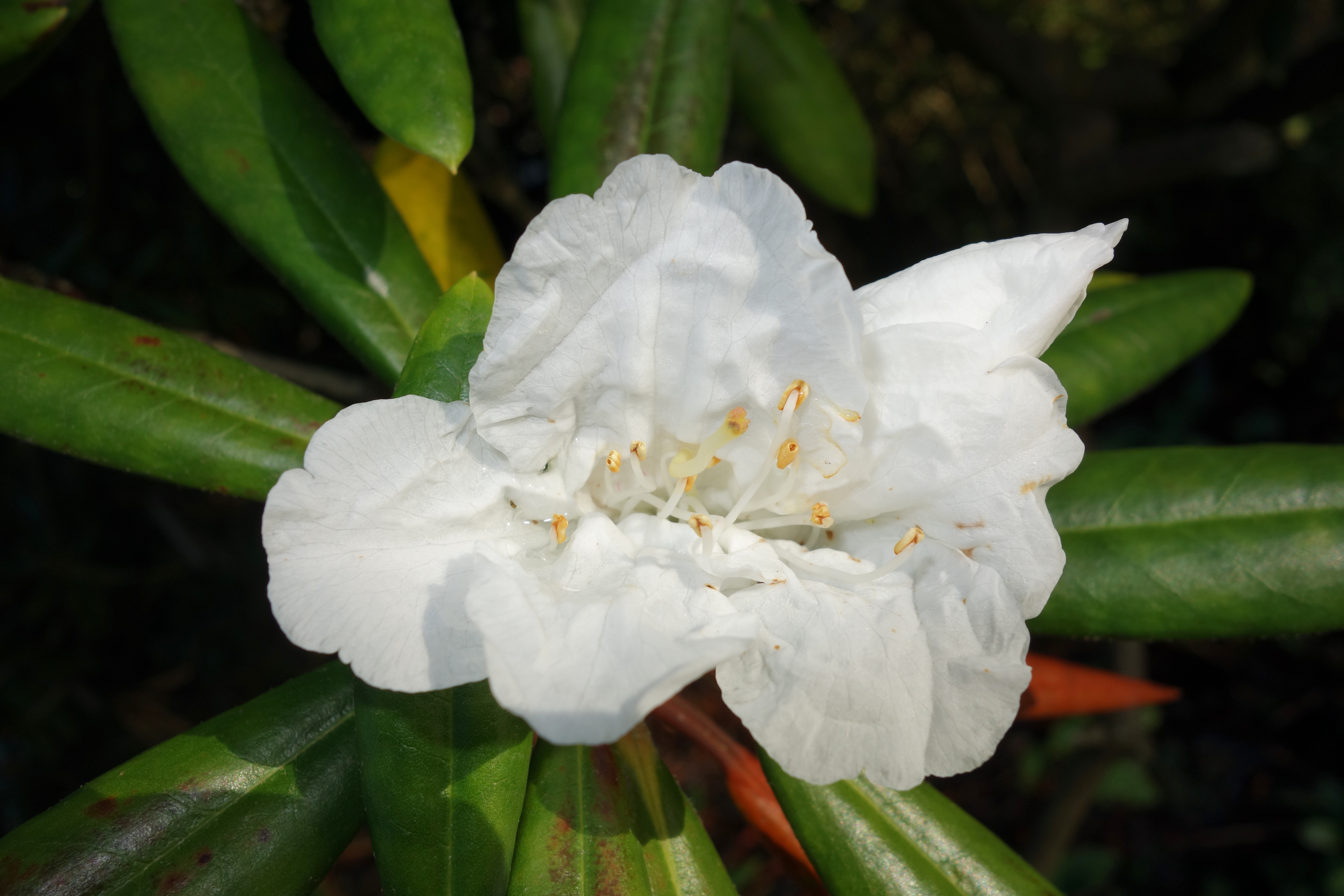

Scientific classification
- Kingdom: Plantae
- Clade: Tracheophytes
- Clade: Angiosperms
- Clade: Eudicots
- Clade: Asterids
- Order: Ericales
- Family: Ericaceae
- Genus: Rhododendron
- Species: R. hyperythrum

Binomial name
- Rhododendron hyperythrum Hayata

= Rhododendron hyperythrum =

Species of plant

Rhododendron hyperythrum (南湖杜鵑 Nánhú dùjuān; 微笑杜鹃 wēixiào dùjuān) is a Rhododendron species endemic to north-central Taiwan at 900–1,200 m (3,000–3,900 ft) altitude. It is an evergreen shrub growing to 2.5 m (8.2 ft) in size, with leathery leaves, elliptic-lanceolate to oblong-lanceolate, 7–12 × 2–3.5 cm in size. The flowers are unusual in being pure white.

The plant remains compact in size, and flowers profusely, making it a popular subject for small gardens.

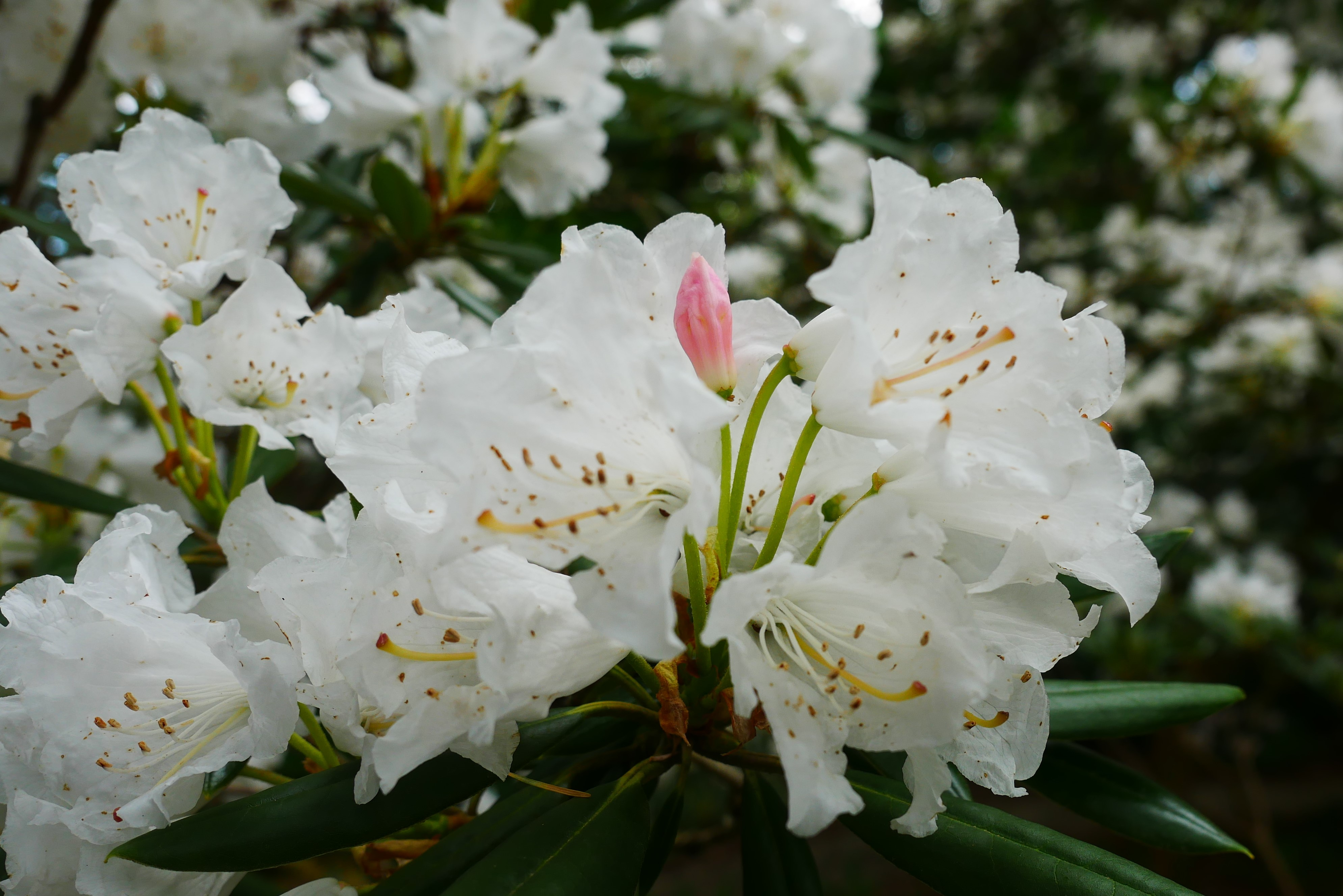
Rhododendron hyperythrum at Rhododendron Botanical garden

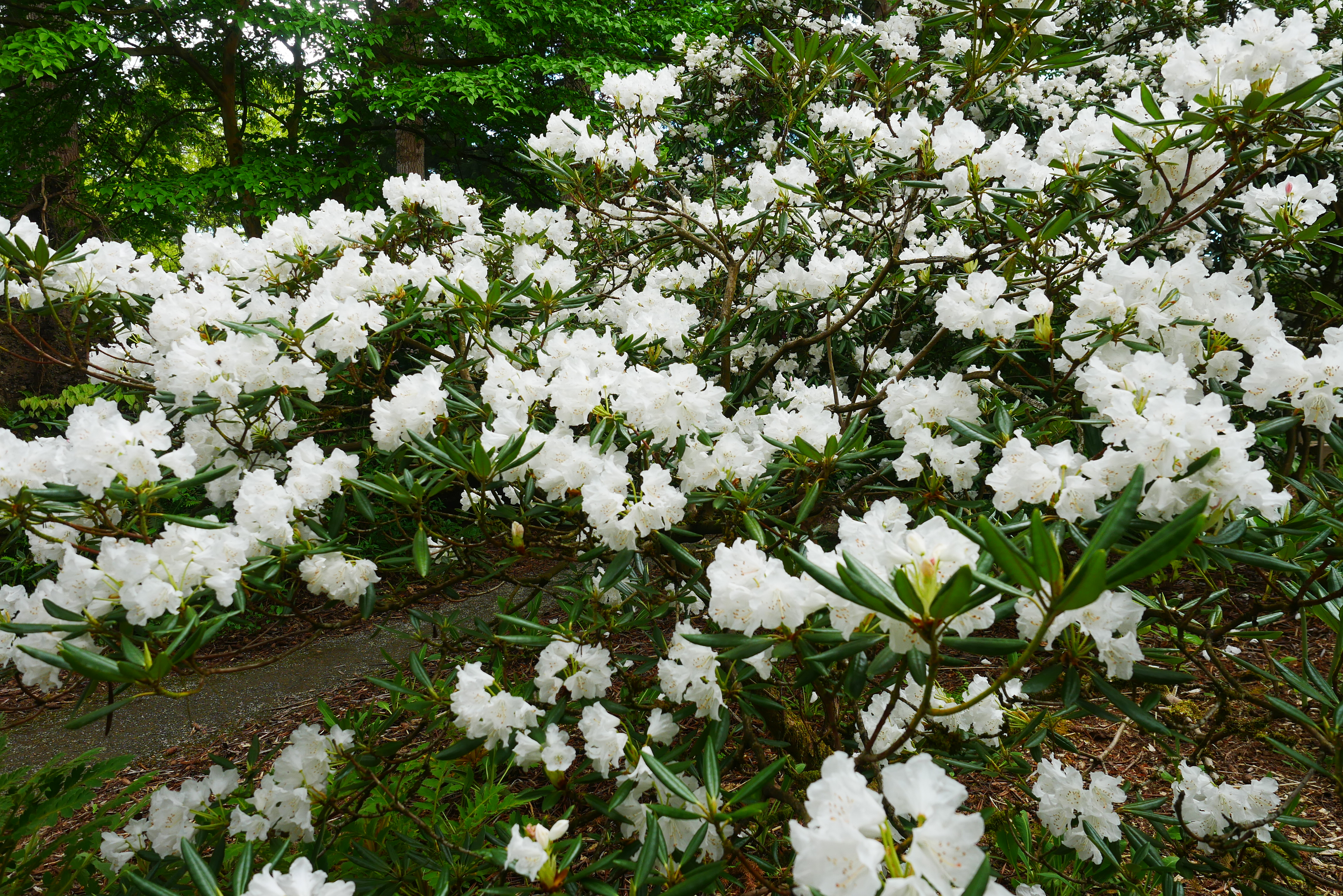
Rhododendron hyperythrum as bush at Rhododendron Botanical garden

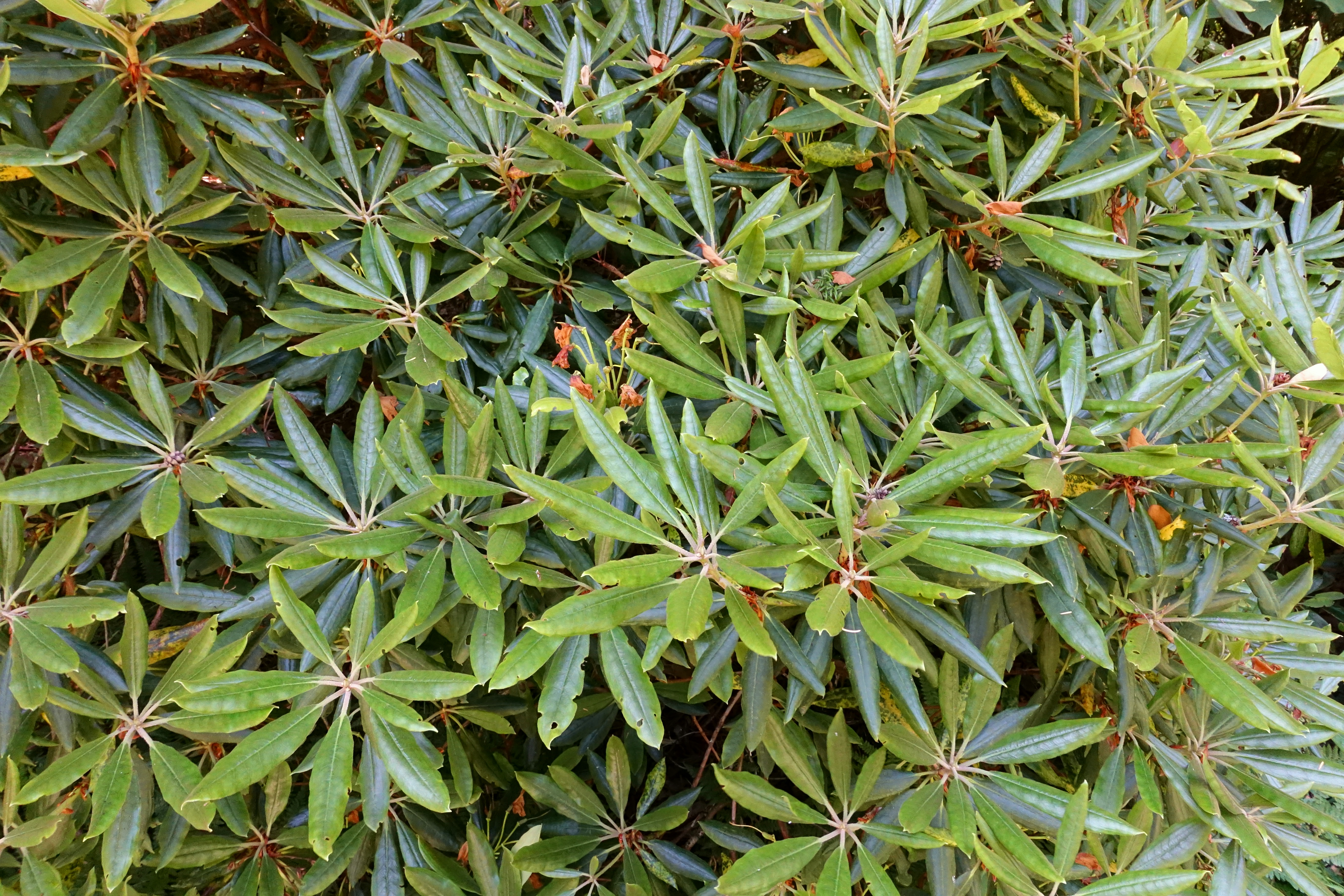
Botanical specimen in the UBC Botanical Garden at the University of British Columbia

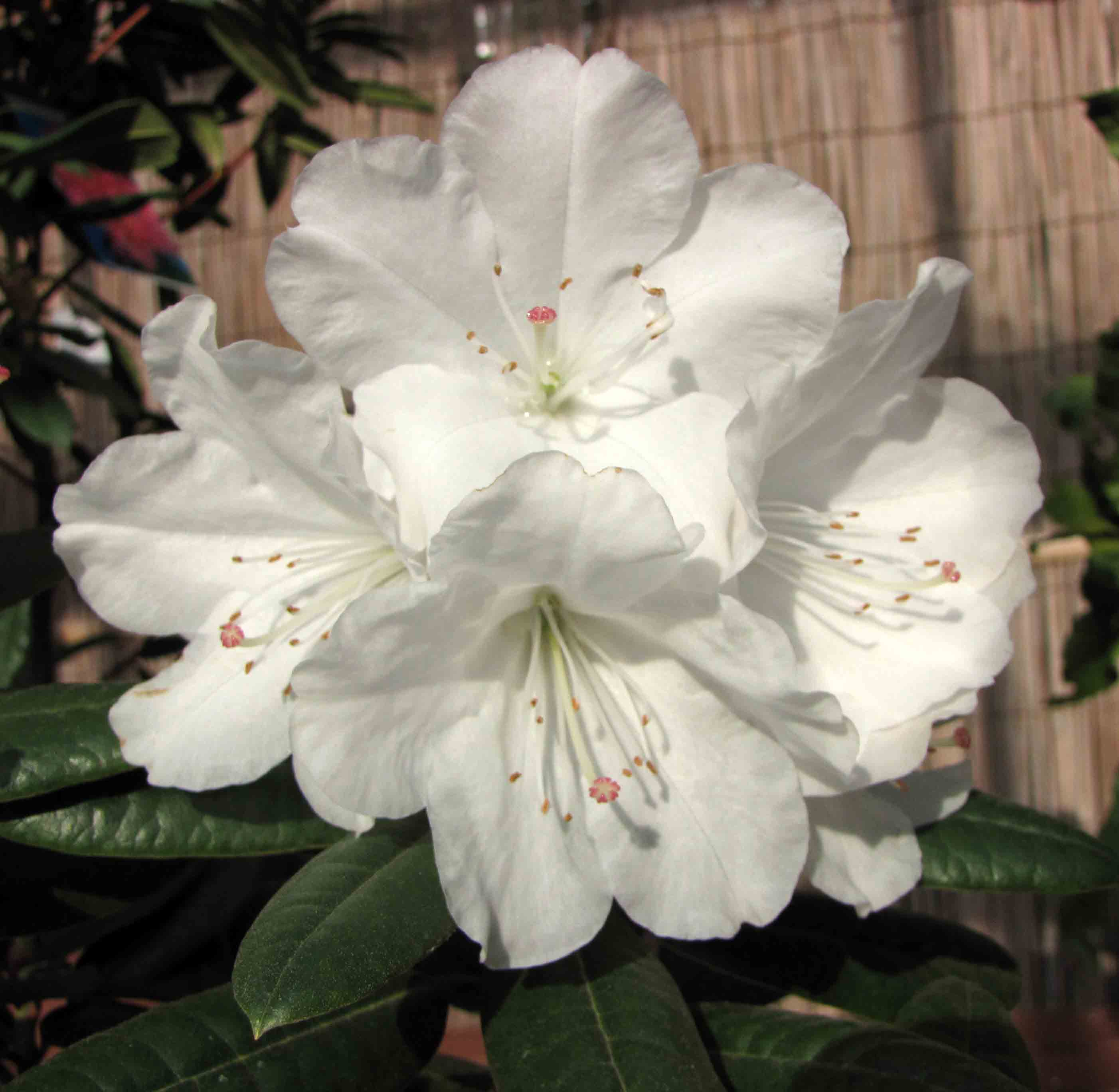
Rhododendron hyperythrum at Kyoto Botanical Garden, Japan
