= Catoferia spicata =

Scientific classification
- Kingdom: Plantae
- Clade: Tracheophytes
- Clade: Angiosperms
- Clade: Eudicots
- Clade: Asterids
- Order: Lamiales
- Family: Lamiaceae
- Genus: Catoferia
- Species: C. spicata

Binomial name
- Catoferia spicata (Benth.) Benth.

Species of flowering plant

Catoferia spicata is a species of flowering plant in the family Lamiaceae. It is native to Colombia and Peru.
