= Haplostachys haplostachya =

Conservation status
- Critically Imperiled (NatureServe)

Scientific classification
- Kingdom: Plantae
- Clade: Tracheophytes
- Clade: Angiosperms
- Clade: Eudicots
- Clade: Asterids
- Order: Lamiales
- Family: Lamiaceae
- Genus: Haplostachys
- Species: H. haplostachya

Binomial name
- Haplostachys haplostachya (A.Gray) H.St.John

Species of plant

Haplostachys haplostachya is a rare species of flowering plant in the mint family known by the common names honohono or Hawaiian mint. It is endemic to Hawaii, where it is now limited to the island of Hawaii and has been extirpated from Kauai and Maui. It has been on the United States' endangered species list since 1979.

Haplostachys haplostachya is probably the only one of the five Haplostachya species that is not now extinct, so it may be the only member of a monotypic genus. There are now fewer than 20,000 individual plants in scattered fragmented populations remaining at Kipukakalawamauna on the Pohakuloa Plateau, the site of the Pohakuloa Training Area. At one time, the plant was not uncommon on the slopes of Mauna Loa and Mauna Kea. Destruction of the habitat by feral ungulates, military construction, consequences of military activity such as dust and fires, introduced plant species, and deforestation have fragmented the plant's distribution and reduced it to its present low numbers. This fragmentation has also led to physical and reproductive isolation in the smaller, more isolated populations, causing a genetic bottleneck.

This is a perennial shrub which grows to 1.5 meters tall. The square stems are lined with fleshy, woolly, somewhat heart-shaped leaves. The inflorescence is a showy raceme of fragrant, woolly white flowers each up to 2 centimeters long. The herbage lacks the minty taste and scent of other mints.

Though there are few wild specimens left, the honohono is cultivated and kept as a garden plant in Hawaii.
