= Catoferia martinezii =

Scientific classification
- Kingdom: Plantae
- Clade: Tracheophytes
- Clade: Angiosperms
- Clade: Eudicots
- Clade: Asterids
- Order: Lamiales
- Family: Lamiaceae
- Genus: Catoferia
- Species: C. martinezii

Binomial name
- Catoferia martinezii Ramamoorthy

Species of flowering plant

Catoferia martinezii is a species of flowering plant in the family Lamiaceae. It is native to Mexico, Guerrero.
