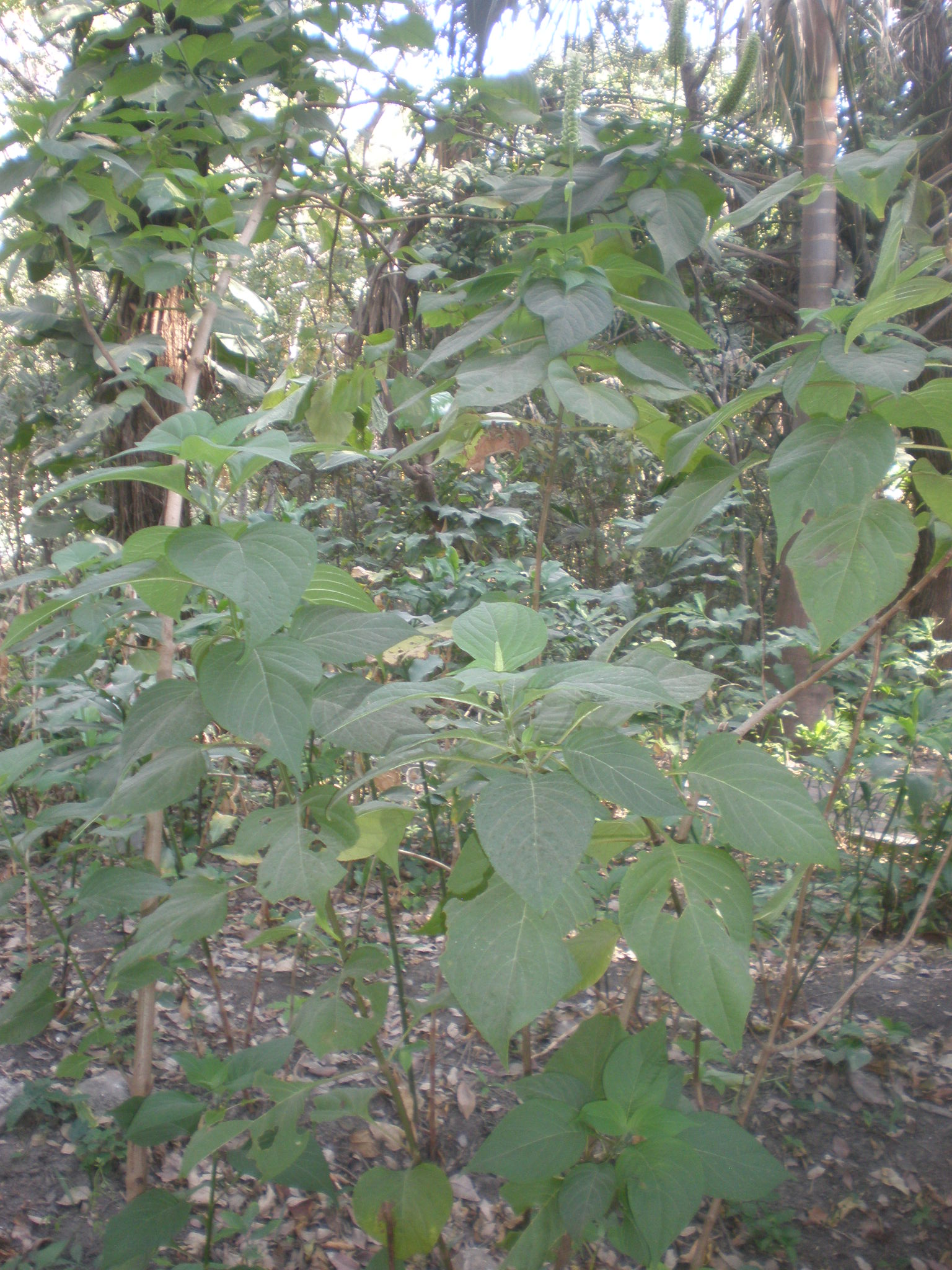
- Catoferia chiapensis

Scientific classification
- Kingdom: Plantae
- Clade: Tracheophytes
- Clade: Angiosperms
- Clade: Eudicots
- Clade: Asterids
- Order: Lamiales
- Family: Lamiaceae
- Genus: Catoferia
- Species: C. chiapensis

Binomial name
- Catoferia chiapensis A.Gray ex Benth.

= Catoferia chiapensis =

Species of flowering plant

Catoferia chiapensis is a species of flowering plant in the family Lamiaceae. Its native range is from Mexico to Honduras.
