= Jinzō Matsumura =

Japanese botanist (1856–1928)

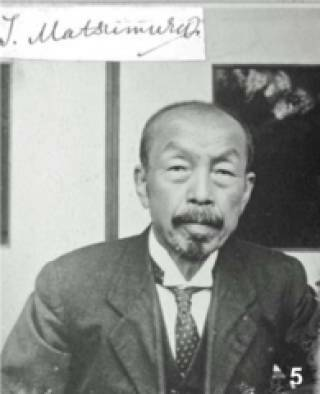
- Born: February 14, 1856; Ibaraki Prefecture
- Died: May 4, 1928 (aged 72); Tokyo, Japan
- Education: University of Würzburg; Ruprecht Karl University of Heidelberg
- Scientific career
- Fields: Botany
- Workplaces: University of Tokyo
- Doctoral students: Bunzō Hayata
- Author abbrev. (botany): Matsum.

Jinzō Matsumura (松村 任三, Matsumura Jinzō; February 14, 1856 – May 4, 1928) was a Japanese botanist.

== Biography ==
Matsumura was born in Ibaraki Prefecture, of a samurai family. He took a great interest in botany as a young man. In 1883, he had been made assistant professor of botany in the University of Tokyo under Ryōkichi Yatabe. Matsumura then studied abroad at the Würzburg and Heidelberg between 1886 and 1888. In 1890, he became professor at the University of Tokyo and in 1897 director of the Koishikawa Botanical Gardens. He also served as dean of the botanical department. In 1922, Matsumura retired from teaching, and began to publish Waka poetry.

== Legacy ==
The genus Matsumurella is named for Matsumura.

== Selected publications ==
Matsumura assisted in the preparation of Brinkley's Unabridged Japanese-English Dictionary (1896), and he published many important works on the flora of Japan, including:

- Nomenclature of Japanese Plants in Latin, Japanese, and Chinese (1884)
- Names of Plants and their Products in English, Japanese, and Chinese (1892)
- Conspectus of Leguminosœ (1902)
- Index plantarum Japonicarum: Cryptogamœ (1904)
- Phanerogamœ (1905)
- with Ito, Tentamen Florœ Lutchuensis (1899)
- with Ito, Rivisio Alni Specierum Japonicarum (1902)
- with Hayata, Enumeratio Plantarum in Insula Formosa Sponte Crescentium (1906)
