= Siphocranion macranthum =

Scientific classification
- Kingdom: Plantae
- Clade: Tracheophytes
- Clade: Angiosperms
- Clade: Eudicots
- Clade: Asterids
- Order: Lamiales
- Family: Lamiaceae
- Genus: Siphocranion
- Species: S. macranthum

Binomial name
- Siphocranion macranthum (Hook.f.) C.Y.Wu

Species of plant

Siphocranion macranthum is a species of flowering plant in the family Lamiaceae. It is commonly known as big-flower siphocranion and tong guan hua in China. It is a perennial herb that is native to Assam, Myanmar, Tibet, Vietnam, South China and East Himalayas. S. macranthum grows in subtropical evergreen and mixed forests.
