= Vuhuangia =

Scientific classification
- Kingdom: Plantae
- Clade: Tracheophytes
- Clade: Angiosperms
- Clade: Eudicots
- Clade: Asterids
- Order: Lamiales
- Family: Lamiaceae
- Subfamily: Nepetoideae
- Tribe: Elsholtzieae
- Genus: Vuhuangia; J.S.Raju, Molinari & Mayta

Genus of flowering plants

Vuhuangia is a genus of flowering plants in the family Lamiaceae. It includes two species native to southern China, northern Vietnam, and the Himalayas.

- Vuhuangia flava (Benth.) Molinari, J.S.Raju & Mayta – Himalayas and southern China
- Vuhuangia penduliflora (W.W.Sm.) Mayta, J.S.Raju & Molinari – south-central China (Yunnan) and northern Vietnam

The genus was described in 2016. The generic name combines the surnames of Wu Cheng-Yi and Huang Shu-Chung, Chinese botanists and Lamiaceae students.
