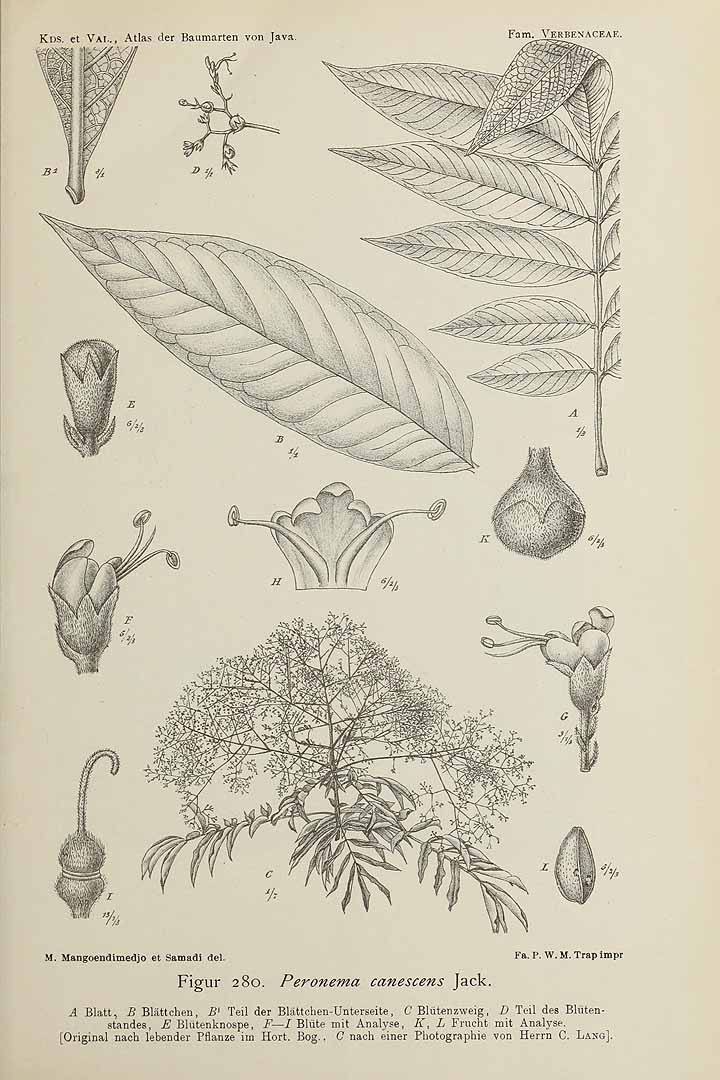
- Illustration of Peronema canescens from Atlas der Baumarten von Java (1914), volume 2, figure 280

Conservation status
- Least Concern (IUCN 3.1)

Scientific classification
- Kingdom: Plantae
- Clade: Tracheophytes
- Clade: Angiosperms
- Clade: Eudicots
- Clade: Asterids
- Order: Lamiales
- Family: Lamiaceae
- Genus: Peronema; Jack
- Species: P. canescens

Binomial name
- Peronema canescens Jack

Synonyms
- Peronema heterophyllum Miq.

= Peronema =

Genus of flowering plants

Peronema is a genus of flowering plant in the family Lamiaceae, first described in 1822. It contains only one known species, Peronema canescens, native to Thailand, Malaysia, Borneo, Sumatra, and Java.
