= Apatelantha =

Scientific classification
- Kingdom: Plantae
- Clade: Tracheophytes
- Clade: Angiosperms
- Clade: Eudicots
- Clade: Asterids
- Order: Lamiales
- Family: Lamiaceae
- Genus: Apatelantha; T.C.Wilson & Henwood (2021)

Species
- Apatelantha albicans (Hook.) T.C.Wilson & Henwood; Apatelantha chrysotricha (F.Muell.) T.C.Wilson & Henwood; Apatelantha insignis (E.Pritz.) T.C.Wilson & Henwood; Apatelantha lachnostachya (C.A.Gardner) T.C.Wilson & Henwood; Apatelantha viscida (E.Pritz.) T.C.Wilson & Henwood

Genus of flowering plants

Apatelantha is a genus of flowering plants in the mint family, Lamiaceae. It includes five species native to Western Australia.

- Apatelantha albicans (Hook.) T.C.Wilson & Henwood – Southwest Australia
- Apatelantha chrysotricha (F.Muell.) T.C.Wilson & Henwood – central Western Australia
- Apatelantha insignis (E.Pritz.) T.C.Wilson & Henwood – south-central Western Australia
- Apatelantha lachnostachya (C.A.Gardner) T.C.Wilson & Henwood – southwest Australia
- Apatelantha viscida (E.Pritz.) T.C.Wilson & Henwood – western Western Australia
