= Medusantha =

Scientific classification
- Kingdom: Plantae
- Clade: Tracheophytes
- Clade: Angiosperms
- Clade: Eudicots
- Clade: Asterids
- Order: Lamiales
- Family: Lamiaceae
- Genus: Medusantha; Harley & J.F.B.Pastore

Genus of plants

Medusantha is a genus of flowering plants belonging to the family Lamiaceae.

Its native range is Brazil.

Species:

- Medusantha carvalhoi (Harley) Harley & J.F.B.Pastore
- Medusantha crinita (Benth.) Harley & J.F.B.Pastore
- Medusantha eriophylla (Pohl ex Benth.) Harley & J.F.B.Pastore
- Medusantha martiusii (Benth.) Harley & J.F.B.Pastore
- Medusantha mollissima (Benth.) Harley & J.F.B.Pastore
- Medusantha multiflora (Pohl ex Benth.) Harley & J.F.B.Pastore
- Medusantha plumosa (Benth.) Harley & J.F.B.Pastore
- Medusantha simulans (Epling) Harley & J.F.B.Pastore
