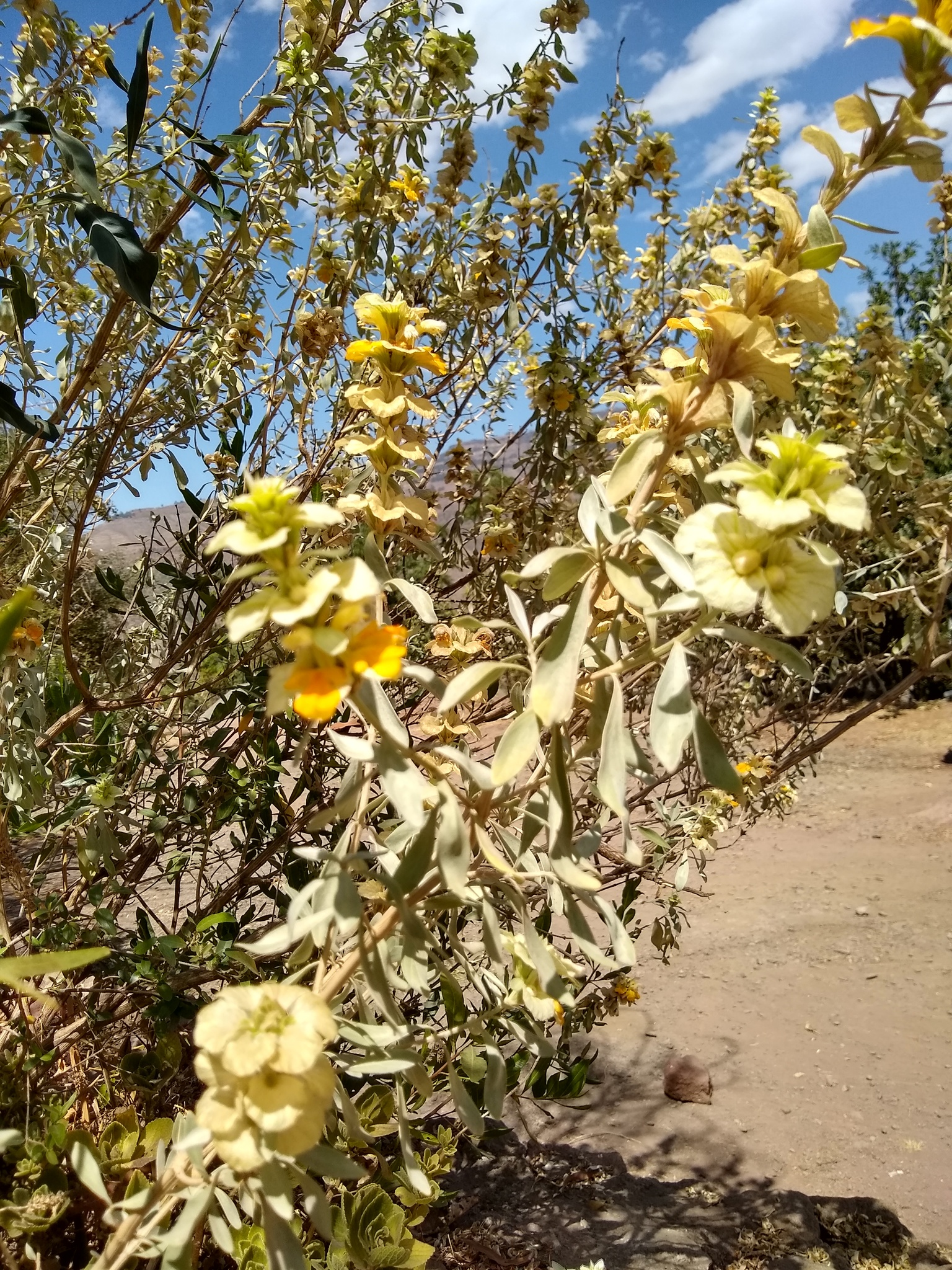
- Rydingia integrifolia

Scientific classification
- Kingdom: Plantae
- Clade: Tracheophytes
- Clade: Angiosperms
- Clade: Eudicots
- Clade: Asterids
- Order: Lamiales
- Family: Lamiaceae
- Subfamily: Lamioideae
- Genus: Rydingia; Scheen & V.A.Albert

= Rydingia =

Genus of flowering plants

Rydingia (tinjute) is a genus of plants in the family Lamiaceae, first described in 2007. The genus is native to eastern Africa and south-western Asia, and found in Eritrea, Ethiopia, Iran, Oman, Pakistan, West Himalaya and Yemen.

The genus was circumscribed by Anne-Cathrine Scheen and Victor Anthony Albert in Syst. & Geogr. Pl. vol.77 (2) on page 234 in 2007.

The genus name of Rydingia is in honour of Per Olof Ryding (b.1951), a Swedish botanist and plant collector in Africa, from the University of Copenhagen in Denmark.

== Species ==
As accepted by Plants of the World Online;

- Rydingia integrifolia (Benth.) Scheen & V.A.Albert - Eritrea, Ethiopia, Yemen
- Rydingia limbata (Benth.) Scheen & V.A.Albert - Pakistan, Kashmir
- Rydingia michauxii (Briq.) Scheen & V.A.Albert - Iran
- Rydingia persica (Burm.f.) Scheen & V.A.Albert - Iran, Oman, Pakistan
