= Hymenopyramis =

Scientific classification
- Kingdom: Plantae
- Clade: Tracheophytes
- Clade: Angiosperms
- Clade: Eudicots
- Clade: Asterids
- Order: Lamiales
- Family: Lamiaceae
- Subfamily: Peronematoideae
- Genus: Hymenopyramis; Wall. ex Griff.

Genus of flowering plants

Hymenopyramis is a genus of plants in the family Lamiaceae, first described in 1843. It is native to Indochina and to the Hainan Province of southern China.

Species

- Hymenopyramis acuminata H.R.Fletcher - Thailand, Vietnam
- Hymenopyramis brachiata Wall. ex Griff. - Thailand, Vietnam, Myanmar; naturalized in India
- Hymenopyramis cana Craib - Hainan, Laos, Cambodia, Thailand
- Hymenopyramis parvifolia Moldenke - Thailand
- Hymenopyramis pubescens Moldenke - Thailand
- Hymenopyramis siamensis Craib - Laos, Cambodia, Thailand
- Hymenopyramis vesiculosa H.R.Fletcher - Thailand
