= Gymneia =

Scientific classification
- Kingdom: Plantae
- Clade: Tracheophytes
- Clade: Angiosperms
- Clade: Eudicots
- Clade: Asterids
- Order: Lamiales
- Family: Lamiaceae
- Genus: Gymneia (Benth.) Harley & J.F.B.Pastore

Genus of plants

Gymneia is a genus of flowering plants belonging to the family Lamiaceae.

Its native range is Brazil to Bolivia.

Species:

- Gymneia ampelophylla (Epling) Harley & J.F.B.Pastore
- Gymneia chapadensis Harley
- Gymneia interrupta (Pohl ex Benth.) Harley & J.F.B.Pastore
- Gymneia malacophylla (Benth.) Harley & J.F.B.Pastore
- Gymneia moniliformis Harley
- Gymneia platanifolia (Mart. ex Benth.) Harley & J.F.B.Pastore
- Gymneia virgata (Benth.) Harley & J.F.B.Pastore
