= Ombrocharis =

Scientific classification
- Kingdom: Plantae
- Clade: Tracheophytes
- Clade: Angiosperms
- Clade: Eudicots
- Clade: Asterids
- Order: Lamiales
- Family: Lamiaceae
- Subfamily: Nepetoideae
- Tribe: Elsholtzieae
- Genus: Ombrocharis; Hand.-Mazz.
- Species: O. dulcis

Binomial name
- Ombrocharis dulcis Hand.-Mazz.

Genus of plants

Ombrocharis is a genus of flowering plant in the tribe Elsholtzieae of the family Lamiaceae, first described in 1936. It contains only one known species, Ombrocharis dulcis, endemic to Hunan Province in China.
