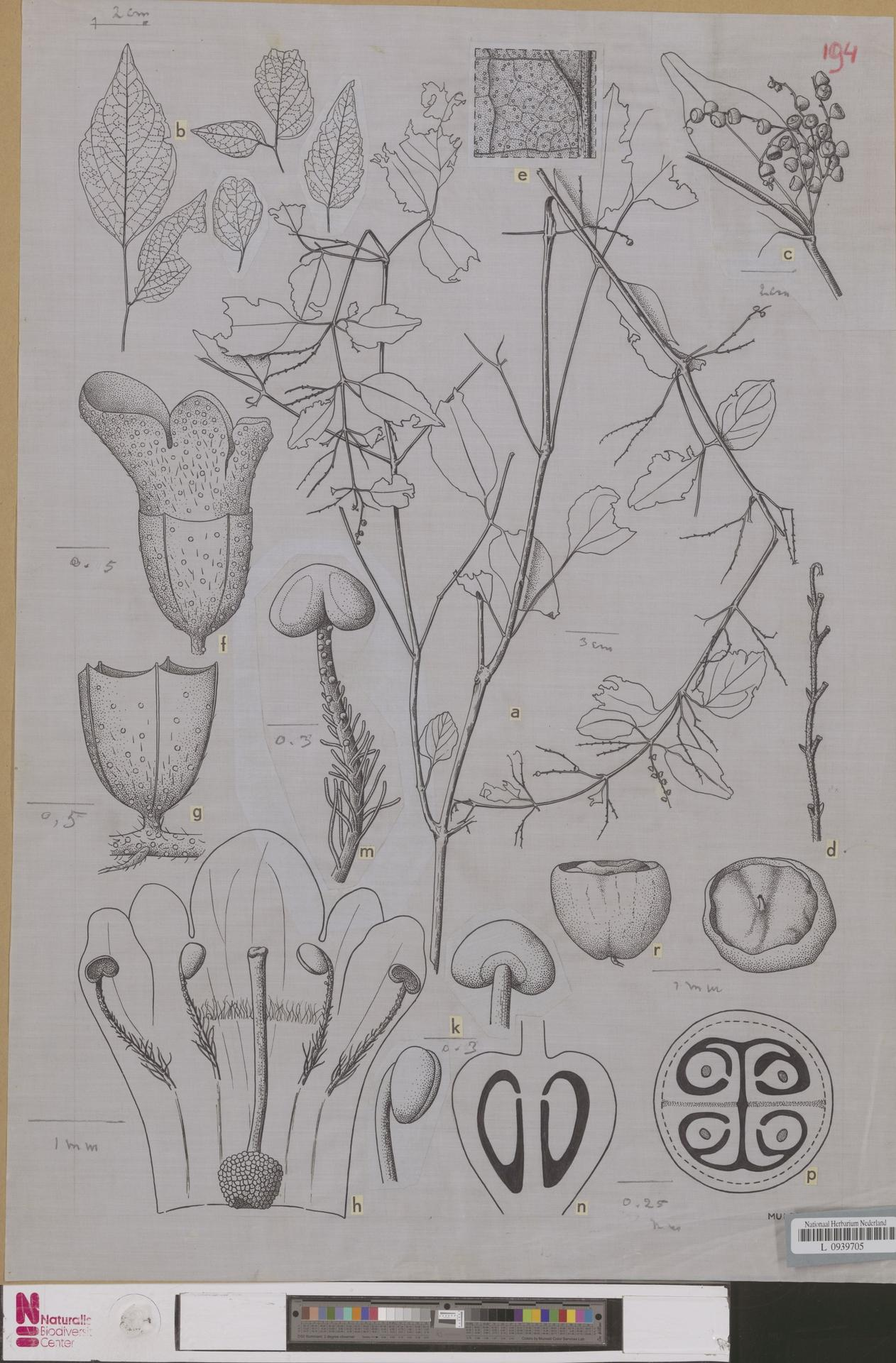
- Botanical illustration of Rokohia cymarioides (as Garrettia cymarioides)

Scientific classification
- Kingdom: Plantae
- Clade: Tracheophytes
- Clade: Angiosperms
- Clade: Eudicots
- Clade: Asterids
- Order: Lamiales
- Family: Lamiaceae
- Subfamily: Peronematoideae
- Genus: Rokohia; Z.H.Feng & U.B.Deshmukh

Synonyms
- Garrettia H.R.Fletcher

= Rokohia =

Genus of flowering plants

Rokohia is a genus of flowering plants in the family Lamiaceae. It includes two species of shrubs or trees native to tropical Asia.

- Rokohia cymarioides (H.J.Lam & A.Meeuse) Z.H.Feng & U.B.Deshmukh – eastern Java and Bali
- Rokohia siamensis (H.R.Fletcher) Z.H.Feng & U.B.Deshmukh – southeastern Yunnan and northern Thailand
