= Pseudochamaesphacos =

Scientific classification
- Kingdom: Plantae
- Clade: Tracheophytes
- Clade: Angiosperms
- Clade: Eudicots
- Clade: Asterids
- Order: Lamiales
- Family: Lamiaceae
- Genus: Pseudochamaesphacos; Parsa (1946)
- Species: P. spinosa

Binomial name
- Pseudochamaesphacos spinosa Parsa (1946)

Genus of flowering plants

Pseudochamaesphacos spinosa is a species of flowering plant in the mint family, Lamiaceae. It is the sole species in genus Pseudochamaesphacos. It is endemic to Iran.
