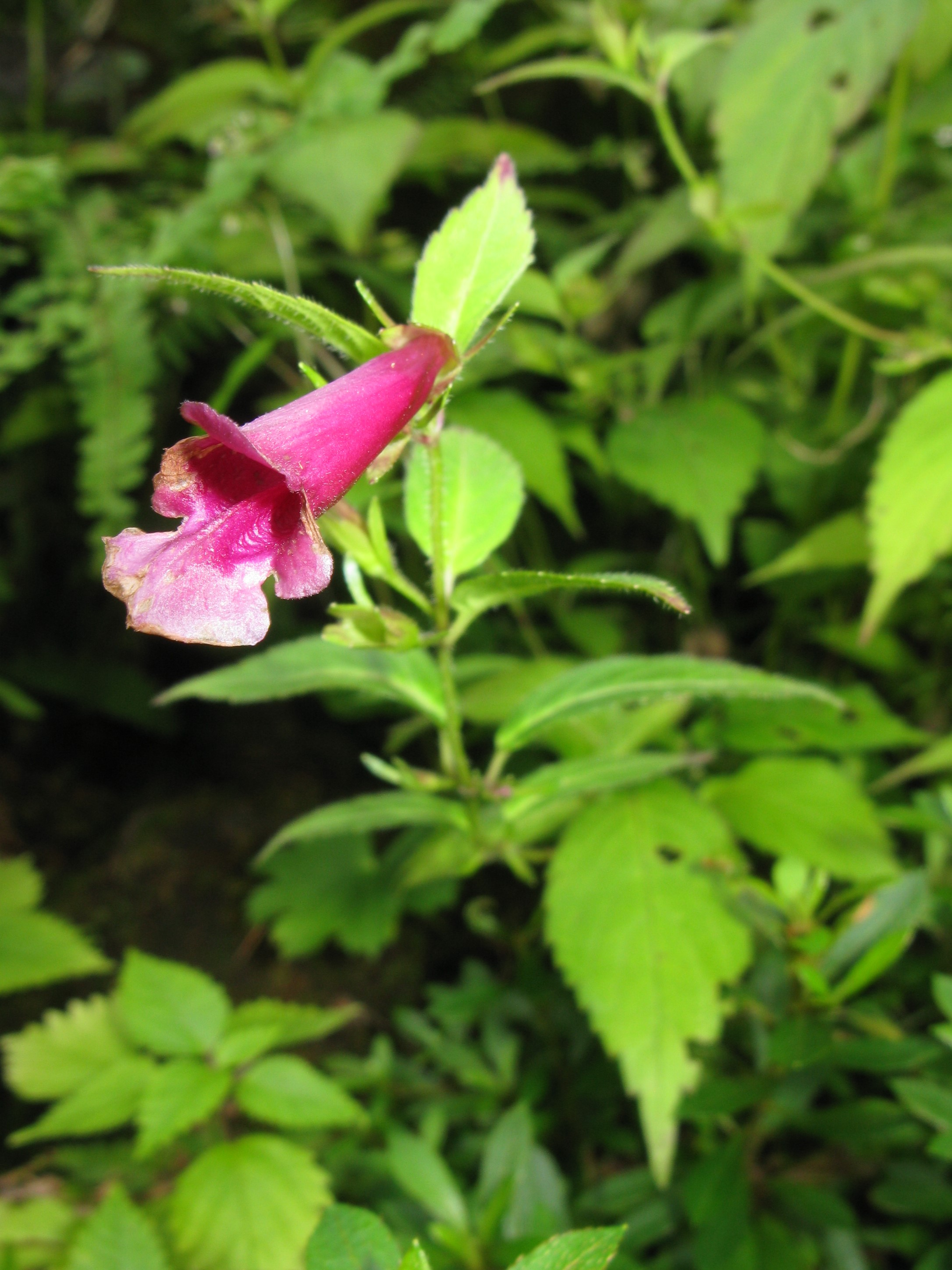
- Chelonopsis yagiharana

Scientific classification
- Kingdom: Plantae
- Clade: Tracheophytes
- Clade: Angiosperms
- Clade: Eudicots
- Clade: Asterids
- Order: Lamiales
- Family: Lamiaceae
- Subfamily: Lamioideae
- Genus: Chelonopsis; Miq.

Synonyms
- Bostrychanthera Benth.

= Chelonopsis =

Genus of flowering plants

Chelonopsis is a genus of plants in the family Lamiaceae, first described in 1865. It is native to China, Japan, and the Western Himalayas.

Species

- Chelonopsis abbreviata C.Y.Wu & H.W.Li - Yunnan
- Chelonopsis bracteata W.W.Sm. - Yunnan
- Chelonopsis cashmerica (Mukerjee) Hedge - Kashmir
- Chelonopsis chekiangensis C.Y.Wu - Anhui, Guangdong, Jiangxi, Zhejiang
- Chelonopsis deflexa (Benth.) Druce - southern China including Taiwan
- Chelonopsis forrestii Anthony - Sichuan
- Chelonopsis giraldii Diels - Gansu, Shaanxi
- Chelonopsis lichiangensis W.W.Sm. - Sichuan, Yunnan
- Chelonopsis longipes Makino - Japan
- Chelonopsis mollissima C.Y.Wu - Yunnan
- Chelonopsis moschata Miq. - Japan
- Chelonopsis odontochila Diels - Sichuan, Yunnan
- Chelonopsis praecox Weckerle & F.K.Huber - Sichuan
- Chelonopsis rosea W.W.Sm. - Yunnan
- Chelonopsis siccanea W.W.Sm. - Sichuan, Yunnan
- Chelonopsis souliei (Bonati) Merr. - Yunnan, Tibet
- Chelonopsis yagiharana Hisauti & Matsuno - Honshu
