= Cyanocephalus =

Scientific classification
- Kingdom: Plantae
- Clade: Tracheophytes
- Clade: Angiosperms
- Clade: Eudicots
- Clade: Asterids
- Order: Lamiales
- Family: Lamiaceae
- Genus: Cyanocephalus (Pohl ex Benth.) Harley & J.F.B.Pastore

Genus of flowering plants

Cyanocephalus is a genus of flowering plants belonging to the family Lamiaceae.

Its native range is Cuba, Brazil to Paraguay.

Species:

- Cyanocephalus adpressus (A.St.-Hil. ex Benth.) Harley & J.F.B.Pastore
- Cyanocephalus apertiflorus (Epling) Harley & J.F.B.Pastore
- Cyanocephalus bombycinus (Epling) Harley & J.F.B.Pastore
- Cyanocephalus caprariifolius (Pohl ex Benth.) Harley & J.F.B.Pastore
- Cyanocephalus cardiophyllus (Pohl ex Benth.) Harley & J.F.B.Pastore
- Cyanocephalus coriaceus (Benth.) Harley & J.F.B.Pastore
- Cyanocephalus cretatus (Epling) Harley & J.F.B.Pastore
- Cyanocephalus cuneatus (Pohl ex Benth.) Harley & J.F.B.Pastore
- Cyanocephalus delicatulus (Harley) Harley & J.F.B.Pastore
- Cyanocephalus desertorum (Pohl ex Benth.) Harley & J.F.B.Pastore
- Cyanocephalus digitatus (Harley) Harley & J.F.B.Pastore
- Cyanocephalus incanus (Briq.) Harley & J.F.B.Pastore
- Cyanocephalus lanatus (Pohl ex Benth.) Harley & J.F.B.Pastore
- Cyanocephalus lippioides (Pohl ex Benth.) Harley & J.F.B.Pastore
- Cyanocephalus nitidulus (Benth.) Harley & J.F.B.Pastore
- Cyanocephalus pedalipes (Griseb.) Harley & J.F.B.Pastore
- Cyanocephalus peduncularis (Benth.) Harley & J.F.B.Pastore
- Cyanocephalus poliodes (Briq.) Harley & J.F.B.Pastore
- Cyanocephalus rugosus (Benth.) Harley & J.F.B.Pastore
- Cyanocephalus selaginifolius (Mart. ex Benth.) Harley & J.F.B.Pastore
- Cyanocephalus tacianae (Harley) Harley & J.F.B.Pastore
- Cyanocephalus tagetifolius (Harley) Harley & J.F.B.Pastore
- Cyanocephalus tenuifolius (Epling) Harley & J.F.B.Pastore
- Cyanocephalus tripartitus (Briq.) Harley & J.F.B.Pastore
- Cyanocephalus viaticus (Harley) Harley & J.F.B.Pastore
