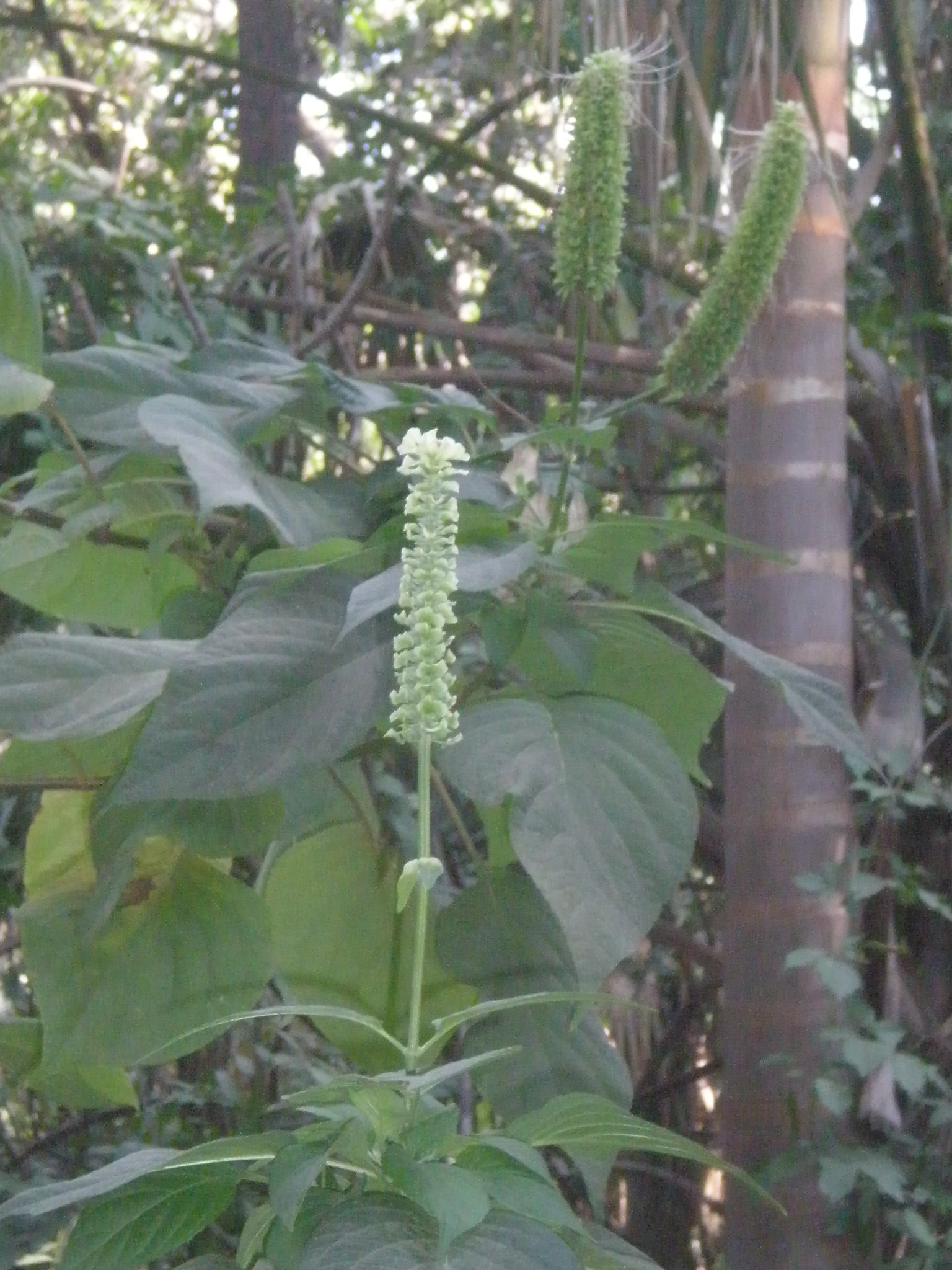
- Catoferia chiapensis

Scientific classification
- Kingdom: Plantae
- Clade: Tracheophytes
- Clade: Angiosperms
- Clade: Eudicots
- Clade: Asterids
- Order: Lamiales
- Family: Lamiaceae
- Subfamily: Nepetoideae
- Tribe: Ocimeae
- Genus: Catoferia (Benth.) Benth.

Type species
- Catoferia capitata (Benth.) Hemsl.

= Catoferia =

Genus of flowering plants

Catoferia is a small genus of plants in the family Lamiaceae composed of only four species. The majority of the species in this genus are confined to southern Mexico, with one species (Catoferia chiapensis) being recorded from Central America, Colombia and Peru in addition to southern Mexico. The beginning of this genus has been traced back to the Cretaceous era, making the genus around 55 to 65 million years old.

== Description ==
The shrub can usually be identified by its flower's exaggerated, protruding stamens and very large, circular sepals (the outer layer surrounding the petal). Petals belonging to plants of this genome typically curve inwards, the species are very similar to the genus Orthosiphon. Shrubs in this group are usually 0.5 and 2 meters tall, with a stem thickness of approximately 3mm. They may also carry spikes ranging from 1.5 to 5.5 centimeters.

== Taxonomy ==
Catoferia was first named and described in full by George Bentham in 1876.

=== Species ===
As of 2023, Plants of the World Online accepts four species of Catoferia.

- Catoferia capitata (Benth.) Hemsl. - Veracruz, Oaxaca, Chiapas, Belize, Guatemala, Peru
- Catoferia chiapensis A.Gray ex Benth. - Chiapas, Guatemala, El Salvador, Honduras
- Catoferia martinezii Ramamoorthy - Guerrero
- Catoferia spicata (Benth.) Benth. - Colombia, Peru
