= Eriophyton =

Scientific classification
- Kingdom: Plantae
- Clade: Tracheophytes
- Clade: Angiosperms
- Clade: Eudicots
- Clade: Asterids
- Order: Lamiales
- Family: Lamiaceae
- Subfamily: Lamioideae
- Genus: Eriophyton; Benth. (1829)

Synonyms
- Alajja Ikonn. (1971); Erianthera Benth. 1833 nom. illeg. not Nees 1832; Menitskia (Krestovsk.) Krestovsk. (2006); Stachyopsis Popov & Vved. (1923); Susilkumara Bennet (1981), nom. superfl.

Genus of flowering plants

Eriophyton is a genus of plants in the Lamiaceae, first described in 1830. Its species are native to Central Asia, western China, and the Himalayas.

== Species ==
12 species are accepted.

- Eriophyton anomalum (Juz.) Lazkov & Sennikov – Kirgizstan, Tajikistan, and Xinjiang
- Eriophyton lamiiflorum (Rupr.) Bräuchler – Kazakhstan, Kyrgyzstan, and Xinjiang
- Eriophyton maleolens (Rech.f.) Salmaki – Afghanistan
- Eriophyton marrubioides (Regel) Ryding – eastern Kazakhstan and Xinjiang
- Eriophyton nepalense (Hedge) Ryding - Nepal
- Eriophyton oblongatum (Schrenk) Bendiksby – central Asia, Afghanistan, and Xinjiang
- Eriophyton rhomboideum (Benth.) Ryding - Tibet, Xinjiang, Kyrgyzstan, Tajikistan, Afghanistan, Pakistan, Himalayas of northern India
- Eriophyton staintonii (Hedge) Ryding - Nepal
- Eriophyton sunhangii Bo Xu, Zhi M.Li & Boufford - Tibet
- Eriophyton tibeticum (Vatke) Ryding – Pakistan, western Himalayas, and western Tibet
- Eriophyton tuberosum (Hedge) Ryding - Tibet, Nepal
- Eriophyton wallichii Benth. - Himalayas, Nepal, Bhutan, Qinghai, Sichuan, Tibet, Yunnan
