= Leptohyptis =

Scientific classification
- Kingdom: Plantae
- Clade: Tracheophytes
- Clade: Angiosperms
- Clade: Eudicots
- Clade: Asterids
- Order: Lamiales
- Family: Lamiaceae
- Genus: Leptohyptis; Harley & J.F.B.Pastore

Genus of plants

Leptohyptis is a genus of flowering plants belonging to the family Lamiaceae.

Its native range is Eastern Brazil.

Species:

- Leptohyptis calida (Mart. ex Benth.) Harley & J.F.B.Pastore
- Leptohyptis leptostachys (Epling) Harley & J.F.B.Pastore
- Leptohyptis macrostachys (Benth.) Harley & J.F.B.Pastore
- Leptohyptis pinheiroi (Harley) Harley & J.F.B.Pastore
- Leptohyptis siphonantha (Harley) Harley & J.F.B.Pastore
