= Physominthe =

Scientific classification
- Kingdom: Plantae
- Clade: Tracheophytes
- Clade: Angiosperms
- Clade: Eudicots
- Clade: Asterids
- Order: Lamiales
- Family: Lamiaceae
- Genus: Physominthe; Harley & J.F.B.Pastore

Genus of plants

Physominthe is a genus of flowering plants belonging to the family Lamiaceae.

Its native range is Brazil.

Species:

- Physominthe longicaulis Harley
- Physominthe vitifolia (Pohl ex Benth.) Harley & J.F.B.Pastore
