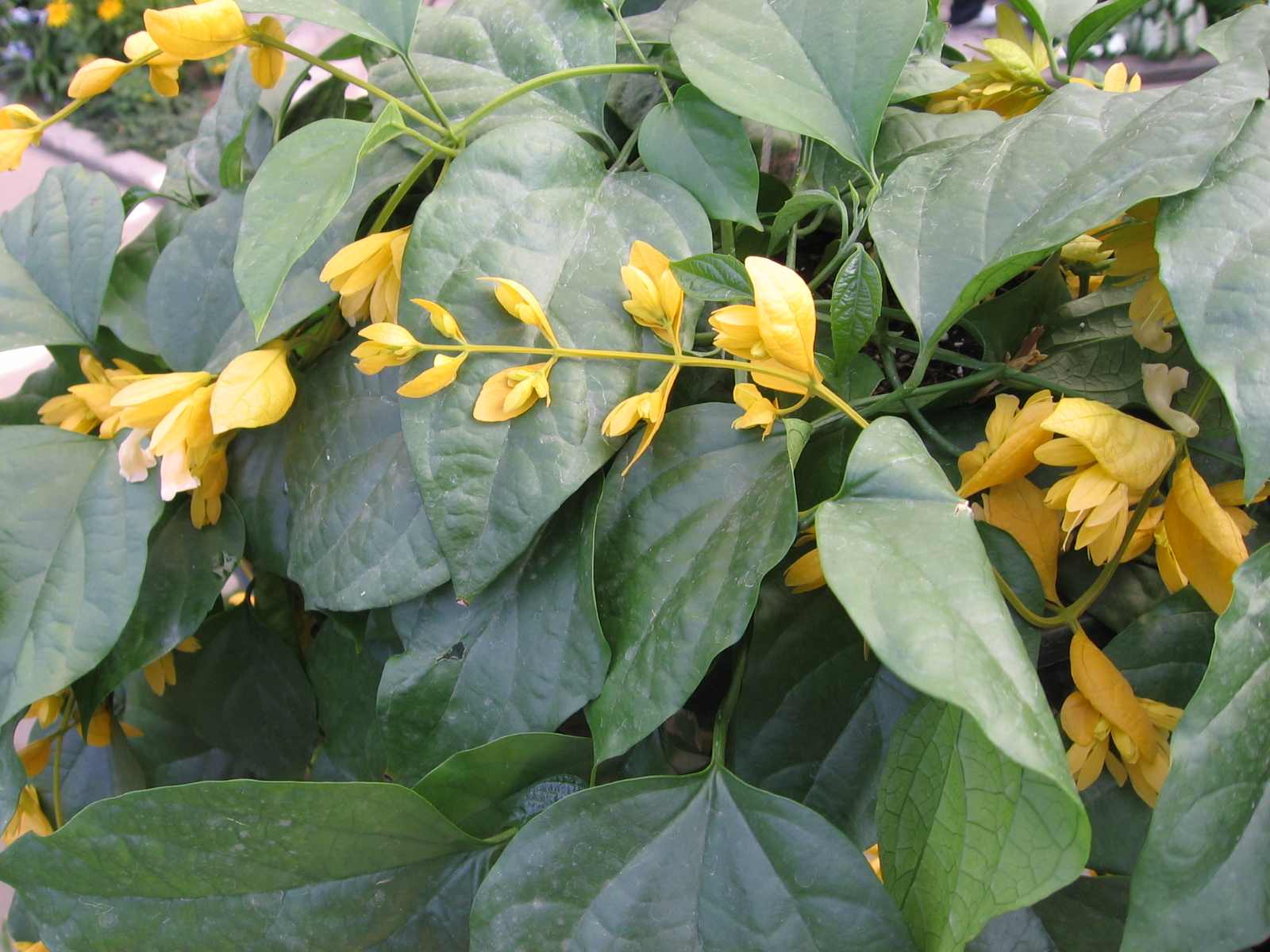
- Nong Noch vine, Petraeovitex bambusetorum, Jardin botanique de Montréal, 2008

Scientific classification
- Kingdom: Plantae
- Clade: Tracheophytes
- Clade: Angiosperms
- Clade: Eudicots
- Clade: Asterids
- Order: Lamiales
- Family: Lamiaceae
- Subfamily: Peronematoideae
- Genus: Petraeovitex; Oliv.

Type species
- Petraeovitex riedelii Oliv. – a synonym of: Petraeovitex multiflora (Sm.) Merr.

= Petraeovitex =

Genus of shrubs

Petraeovitex is a genus of eight climbing shrub species known to science, of the mint family Lamiaceae (formerly placed within Verbenaceae). Collectively, they grow naturally in Borneo, Peninsular Malaysia, Sumatra, the Philippines, the Moluccas, New Guinea, Bismarck Archipelago, the Solomon Islands and Cape York Peninsula, Australia.

== Species ==
The 1981 review paper by Harold N. Moldenke was the source, additional distribution information came from the Australian Tropical Rainforest Plants information system:

1. Petraeovitex bambusetorum King & Gamble – Borneo
2. Petraeovitex kinabaluensis Munir – Borneo
3. Petraeovitex membranacea Merr. – Borneo
4. Petraeovitex multiflora (Sm.) Merr. – Moluccas, New Guinea, Bismarck Arch., Solomon Is., Cape York Peninsula, Australia
5. Petraeovitex scortechinii King & Gamble – Borneo, Peninsular Malaysia
6. Petraeovitex sumatrana H.J.Lam – Sumatra, Borneo
7. Petraeovitex trifoliata Merr. – Philippines, Borneo
8. Petraeovitex wolfei J.Sinclair – Peninsular Malaysia
