= Siphocranion =

Scientific classification
- Kingdom: Plantae
- Clade: Tracheophytes
- Clade: Angiosperms
- Clade: Eudicots
- Clade: Asterids
- Order: Lamiales
- Family: Lamiaceae
- Subfamily: Nepetoideae
- Tribe: Ocimeae
- Genus: Siphocranion; Kudô

Genus of plants

Siphocranion is a genus of plants in the family Lamiaceae, first described in 1929. It is native to China, the Himalayas, and northern Indochina.

Species

- Siphocranion macranthum (Hook.f.) C.Y.Wu - Assam, south central and southeast China, east Himalaya, Myanmar, Tibet, Vietnam.
- Siphocranion nudipes (Hemsl.) Kudô - Fujian, Guangdong, Guizhou, Hubei, Jiangxi, Sichuan, Yunnan.
