= Heliacria =

Scientific classification
- Kingdom: Plantae
- Clade: Tracheophytes
- Clade: Angiosperms
- Clade: Eudicots
- Clade: Asterids
- Order: Lamiales
- Family: Lamiaceae
- Genus: Heliacria; Bo Li, C.L.Xiang, T.S.Hoang & Nuraliev (2023)
- Species: H. maritima

Binomial name
- Heliacria maritima Bo Li, C.L.Xiang, T.S.Hoang & Nuraliev (2023)

Genus of flowering plants

Heliacria maritima is a species of flowering plant in the mint family, Lamiaceae. It is the sole species in genus Heliacria. It is native to southeastern Vietnam.
