= Haplostachys =

Honohono

Scientific classification
- Kingdom: Plantae
- Clade: Tracheophytes
- Clade: Angiosperms
- Clade: Eudicots
- Clade: Asterids
- Order: Lamiales
- Family: Lamiaceae
- Subfamily: Lamioideae
- Genus: Haplostachys (A.Gray) Hillebr.

Genus of flowering plants

Haplostachys (honohono) is a genus of flowering plants in the mint family, Lamiaceae, first described as a genus in 1888. The entire genus is endemic to the Hawaiian Islands, although 4 of the 5 known species that have been placed in the genus are now believed to be extinct, the fifth listed as "Critically Imperiled."

Species

- †Haplostachys bryanii Sherff - Molokai but apparently extinct
- Haplostachys haplostachya (A.Gray) H.St.John - Kauai, Maui, Hawaii; Critically Imperiled
- †Haplostachys linearifolia (Drake) Sherff - Maui, Molokai but apparently extinct on both islands
- †Haplostachys munroi C.N.Forbes - Lanai but apparently extinct
- †Haplostachys truncata (A.Gray) Hillebr. - Maui but apparently extinct
