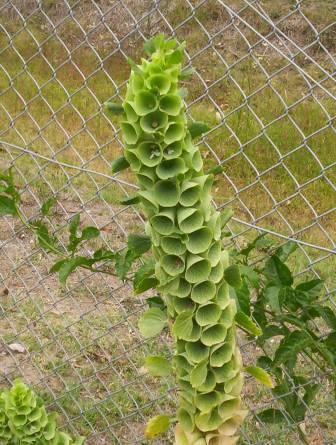
- Persistent calyces

Scientific classification
- Kingdom: Plantae
- Clade: Embryophytes
- Clade: Tracheophytes
- Clade: Spermatophytes
- Clade: Angiosperms
- Clade: Eudicots
- Clade: Asterids
- Order: Lamiales
- Family: Lamiaceae
- Genus: Moluccella
- Species: M. laevis

Binomial name
- Moluccella laevis L.

= Moluccella laevis =

Species of flowering plant

Moluccella laevis, the Bells-of-Ireland, Bells of Ireland, Molucca balmis, shellflower or shell flower, is a summer flowering annual, native to Turkey, Syria and the Caucasus. It is cultivated for its spikes of flowers.

The tiny white flowers are surrounded by apple green calyces which are persistent. The rounded leaves are pale green.

Fast growing, Moluccella laevis will reach 1 metre (3.28 feet) and spread to 30 centimeters (11.8 inches) with an erect, branching habit.

A member of the mint family, the blooming stems can be cut and used in fresh or dried flower arrangements. The domestic plant is self-seeding, prefers full sun and regular water and is unlikely to do well in hot, humid climates.
