= Hanceola =

Scientific classification
- Kingdom: Plantae
- Clade: Tracheophytes
- Clade: Angiosperms
- Clade: Eudicots
- Clade: Asterids
- Order: Lamiales
- Family: Lamiaceae
- Subfamily: Nepetoideae
- Tribe: Ocimeae
- Genus: Hanceola; Kudô

Synonyms
- Hancea Hemsl. 1890 not Seem. 1857 nor Pierre 1891

Genus of flowering plants

Hanceola is a genus of flowering plants in the mint family, Lamiaceae, first described with this name in 1929. The entire genus is endemic to China.

Species

- Hanceola cavaleriei (H.Lév.) Kudô - Guizhou
- Hanceola cordivata Y.Z.Sun - Guizhou, Sichuan
- Hanceola exserta Y.Z.Sun ex C.Y.Wu - Fujian, Guangdong, Hunan, Jiangxi, Zhejiang
- Hanceola flexuosa C.Y.Wu & H.W.Li - Guangxi
- Hanceola labordei (H.Lév.) Y.Z.Sun - Guizhou
- Hanceola mairei (H.Lév.) Y.Z.Sun - Yunnan
- Hanceola sinensis (Hemsl.) Kudô - Guangxi, Guizhou, Hunan, Sichuan, Yunnan
- Hanceola tuberifera Y.Z.Sun ex G.Y.Wu - Sichuan
