= Moluccella =

Scientific classification
- Kingdom: Plantae
- Clade: Tracheophytes
- Clade: Angiosperms
- Clade: Eudicots
- Clade: Asterids
- Order: Lamiales
- Family: Lamiaceae
- Subfamily: Lamioideae
- Genus: Moluccella; L.

Synonyms
- Molucca Mill.; Chasmonia C.Presl; Chartocalyx Regel, illegitimate name; Harmsiella Briq.; Sulaimania Hedge & Rech.f.

Genus of plants

Moluccella is a genus of annual and short-lived perennial plants native to Central + southwestern Asia and the Mediterranean. They are tall, upright, branched plants to 1 metre (3 ft 3 in) or more with toothed leaves and small white fragrant flowers.

Species

- Moluccella aucheri (Boiss.) Scheen - Iran, Pakistan
- Moluccella bucharica (B.Fedtsch.) Ryding - Tajikistan
- Moluccella fedtschenkoana (Kudr.) Ryding - Tajikistan
- Moluccella laevis L. - Bells of Ireland - Turkmenistan, Iran, Iraq, Caucasus, Cyprus, Syria, Lebanon, Palestine, Turkey; naturalized in scattered locations in Europe, Africa, and North America
- Moluccella olgae (Regel) Ryding - Tajikistan, Kyrgyzstan
- Moluccella otostegioides Prain - Pakistan
- Moluccella sogdiana (Kudr.) Ryding - Tajikistan
- Moluccella spinosa L. - Mediterranean from Spain + Algeria to Turkey + Palestine

== Cultivation ==
Marginally frost hardy, these plants prefer full sun and moderately fertile, moist but well-drained soil. Propagation is from seed.
