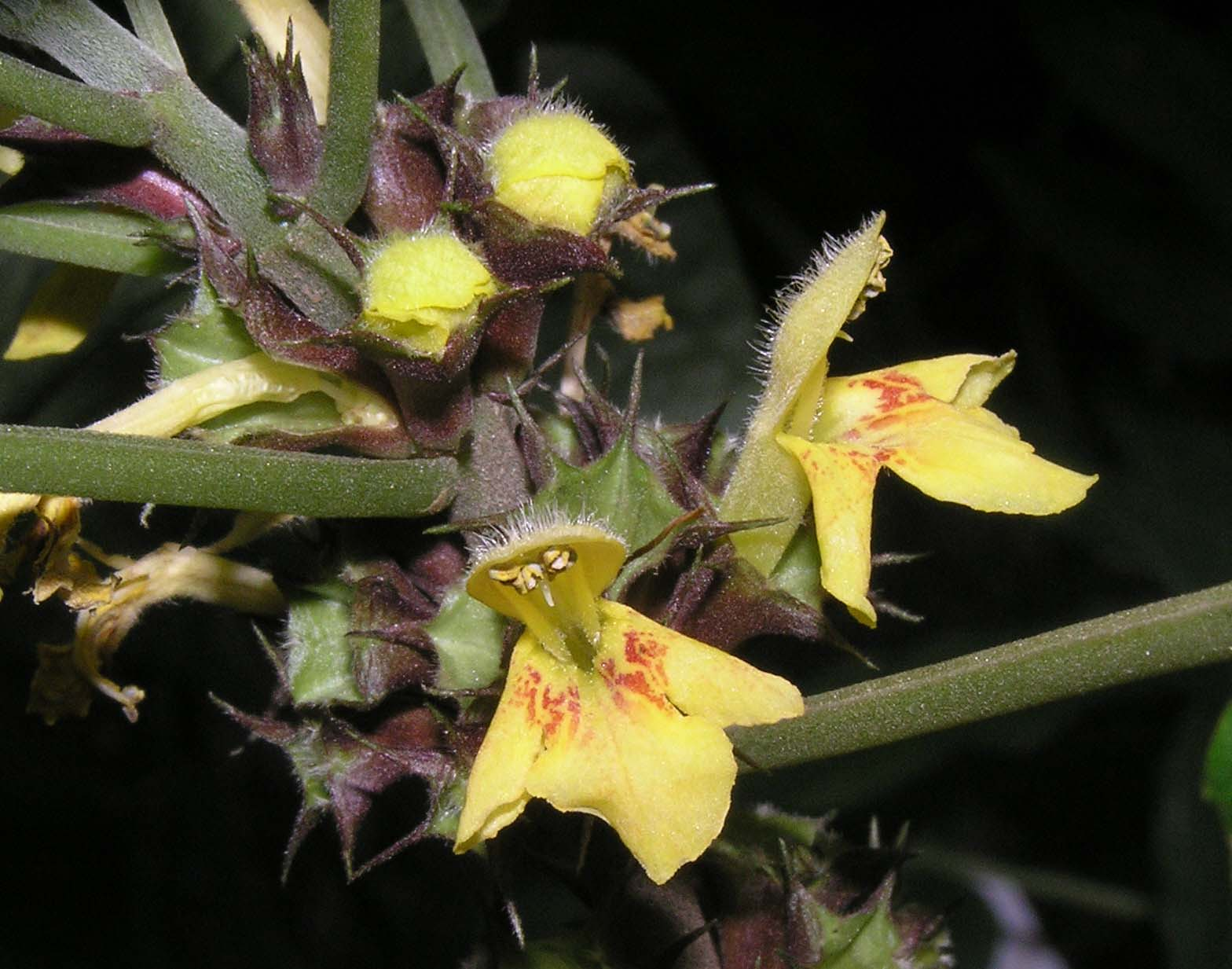
- Paraphlomis javanica in the Hong Kong Botanical Garden

Scientific classification
- Kingdom: Plantae
- Clade: Embryophytes
- Clade: Tracheophytes
- Clade: Angiosperms
- Clade: Eudicots
- Clade: Asterids
- Order: Lamiales
- Family: Lamiaceae
- Subfamily: Lamioideae
- Genus: Paraphlomis; Prain

Type species
- Paraphlomis javanica var. javanica

Synonyms
- Ajugoides Makino; Matsumurella Makino; Pogonanthera H.W.Li & X.H.Guo 1993 not Blume 1831 nor Spach 1840; Sinopogonanthera H.W.Li

= Paraphlomis =

Genus of flowering plants

Paraphlomis is a genus of flowering plants in the mint family, Lamiaceae, first described in 1901. It is native to China, Japan, Korea, the eastern Himalayas, Indochina, and Malesia.

== Species ==
48 species are accepted.

- Paraphlomis albida Hand.-Mazz. – Fujian, Guangdong, Guangxi, Hunan, Jiangxi, Taiwan
- Paraphlomis albiflora (Hemsl.) Hand.-Mazz. – Hubei, Sichuan, Vietnam
- Paraphlomis albotomentosa C.Y.Wu – Hunan
- Paraphlomis baiwanensis W.Y.Zhao, Y.P.Chen & Q.Fan – Guangdong
- Paraphlomis breviflora B.Y.Ding, Y.L.Xu & Z.H.Chen – Guangxi
- Paraphlomis brevifolia C.Y.Wu & H.W.Li – Guangxi
- Paraphlomis caloneura K.J.Yan, Y.P.Chen & Y.Feng Huang – Guangxi
- Paraphlomis cauliflora S.S.Ying – Taiwan
- Paraphlomis chinensis (Benth.) J.C.Yuan, Y.P.Chen & C.L.Xiang – southeastern China, southwestern Japan (Gotō Islands), and Taiwan
- Paraphlomis coronata (Vaniot) Y.P.Chen & C.L.Xiang – southern China and Taiwan
- Paraphlomis foliata (Dunn) C.Y.Wu & H.W.Li – Anhui, Fujian, Guangdong, Jiangxi
- Paraphlomis formosana (Hayata) T.H.Hsieh & T.C.Huang – southern China including Taiwan
- Paraphlomis hirsutissima C.Y.Wu – Yunnan
- Paraphlomis hispida C.Y.Wu – Bangladesh, Yunnan, Guangxi, Vietnam
- Paraphlomis hsiwenii Y.P.Chen & Xiong Li – Guangxi
- Paraphlomis humilis (Miq.) J.C.Yuan, Y.P.Chen & C.L.Xiang – Japan (southwestern Honshu, Shikoku, and Kyushu)
- Paraphlomis intermedia C.Y.Wu & H.W.Li – Anhui, Zhejiang
- Paraphlomis javanica (Blume) Prain – China, Himalayas, Indochina, Borneo, Java, Sumatra, Philippines
- Paraphlomis jiangyongensis X.L.Yu & A.Liu – Hunan
- Paraphlomis jinggangshanensis Boufford, W.B.Liao & W.Y.Zhao – Jiangxi
- Paraphlomis koreana S.C.Ko & G.Y.Chung – Korea
- Paraphlomis kuankuoshuiensis R.B.Zhang, D.Tan & C.B.Ma – Guizhou
- Paraphlomis kwangtungensis C.Y.Wu & H.W.Li – Guangdong
- Paraphlomis lanceolata Hand.-Mazz. – Guangdong, Guangxi, Hunan, and Jiangxi
- Paraphlomis lancidentata Y.Z.Sun – Zhejiang and Vietnam
- Paraphlomis longicalyx Y.P.Chen & C.L.Xiang – Guangxi and Guizhou
- Paraphlomis membranacea C.Y.Wu & H.W.Li – Yunnan and Vietnam
- Paraphlomis montigena (X.H.Guo & S.B.Zhou) J.C.Yuan, Y.P.Chen & C.L.Xiang – Anhui
- Paraphlomis myrioclada J.C.Yuan, Y.P.Chen & C.L.Xiang – Guangdong
- Paraphlomis nana Y.Chen – Chongqing
- Paraphlomis oblongifolia (Blume) Prain – Java, Sumatra, and Sulawesi
- Paraphlomis octopus Q.Fan, Y.P.Chen & Ying Liu – Guangxi and Guangdong
- Paraphlomis parviflora C.Y.Wu & H.W.Li – Taiwan
- Paraphlomis patentisetulosa C.Y.Wu – Guangdong
- Paraphlomis paucisetosa C.Y.Wu – Guangxi
- Paraphlomis qingyuanensis W.Y.Zhao, R.M.Wu & Q.Fan – Guangdong
- Paraphlomis reflexa C.Y.Wu & H.W.Li – Jiangxi
- Paraphlomis seticalyx C.Y.Wu – Guangxi
- Paraphlomis setulosa C.Y.Wu & H.W.Li – Anhui and Jiangxi
- Paraphlomis shunchangensis Z.Y.Li & M.S.Li – southeastern China
- Paraphlomis strictiflora J.C.Yuan, B.Chen & C.L.Xiang – Guizhou
- Paraphlomis subcoriacea C.Y.Wu – Guangxi and Guangdong
- Paraphlomis szechuanensis (C.Y.Wu) J.C.Yuan, Y.P.Chen & C.L.Xiang – Chongqing
- Paraphlomis tomentosocapitata Yamam. – Taiwan
- Paraphlomis tuberifera (Makino) J.C.Yuan, Y.P.Chen & C.L.Xiang – Japan (southern Kyushu), Ryukyu Islands, Taiwan, and southeastern China
- Paraphlomis yangsoensis (Y.Z.Sun) J.C.Yuan, Y.P.Chen & C.L.Xiang – Guangxi
- Paraphlomis yingdeensis W.Y.Zhao, Y.Q.Li & Q.Fan – Guangdong
- Paraphlomis youyangensis H.Jiang, R.B.Zhang & Tan Deng – Chongqing
