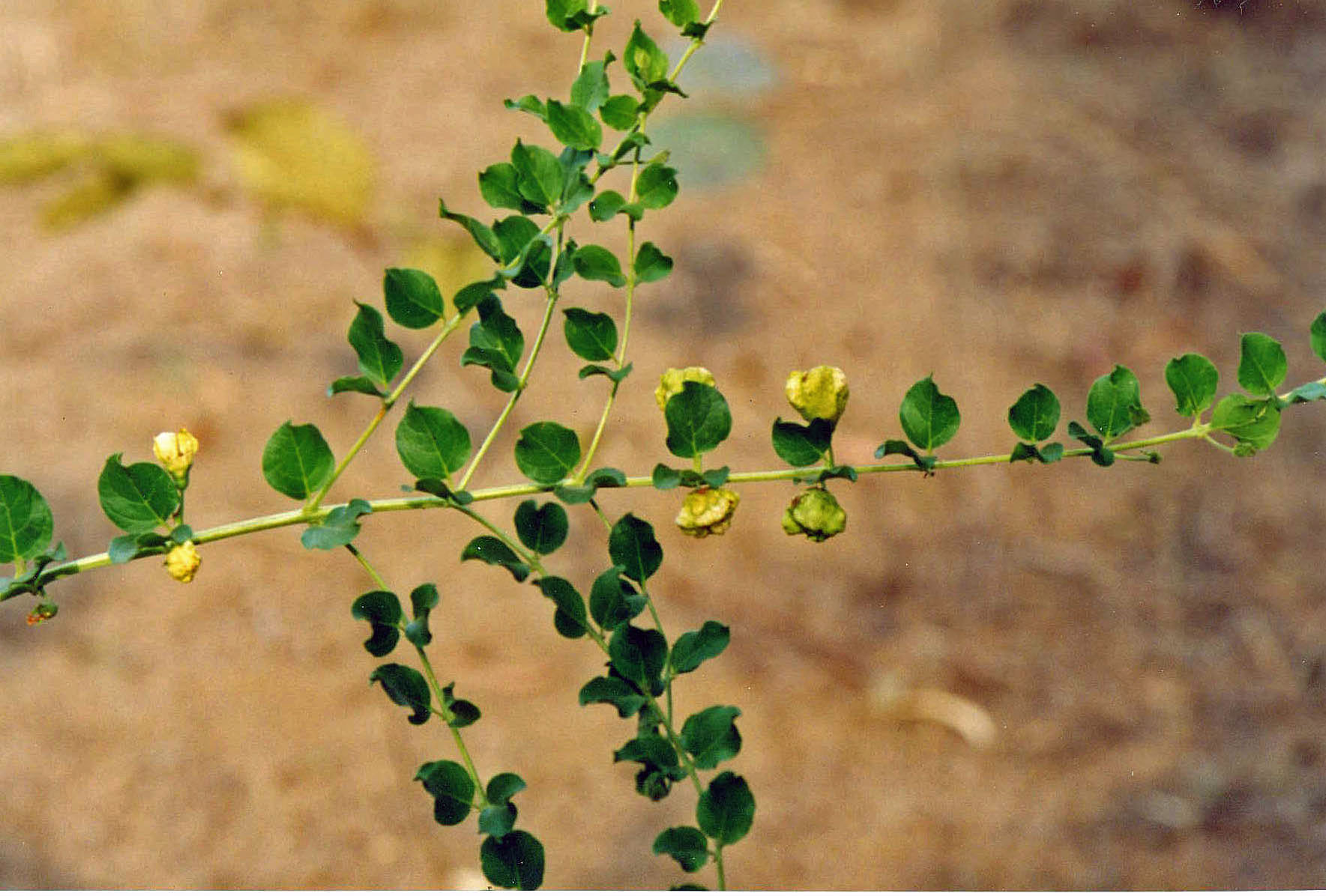

Scientific classification
- Kingdom: Plantae
- Clade: Tracheophytes
- Clade: Angiosperms
- Clade: Eudicots
- Clade: Asterids
- Order: Lamiales
- Family: Lamiaceae
- Subfamily: Ajugoideae
- Genus: Kalaharia; Baill.
- Species: K. uncinata

Binomial name
- Kalaharia uncinata (Schinz) Moldenke

Synonyms
- Clerodendrum uncinatum Schinz; Rotheca uncinata (Schinz) P.P.J.Herman & Retief; Cyclonema spinescens Oliv. 1876 not Klotzsch 1861; Kalaharia spinipes Baill.; Clerodendrum spinescens Gürke

= Kalaharia uncinata =

Species of flowering plant

Kalaharia is a genus of flowering plant in the family Lamiaceae, first described in 1891. It contains only one known species, Kalaharia uncinata. It is native to central and southern Africa from Cape Province of South Africa north to Gabon and Tanzania.
