= Rokohia siamensis =

Scientific classification
- Kingdom: Plantae
- Clade: Tracheophytes
- Clade: Angiosperms
- Clade: Eudicots
- Clade: Asterids
- Order: Lamiales
- Family: Lamiaceae
- Genus: Rokohia
- Species: R. siamensis

Binomial name
- Rokohia siamensis (H.R.Fletcher) Z.H.Feng & U.B.Deshmukh

Synonyms
- Garrettia siamensis H.R.Fletcher

Genus of flowering plants

Rokohia siamensis is a species of flowering plant in the family Lamiaceae. It a shrub or tree native to southern China (southeastern Yunnan) and northern Thailand.

The species was first described as Garrettia siamensis by Harold Fletcher in 1937. In 2024 it was placed in the genus Rokohia as Rokohia siamensis.
