= Bunzō Hayata =

Japanese botanist (1874–1934)

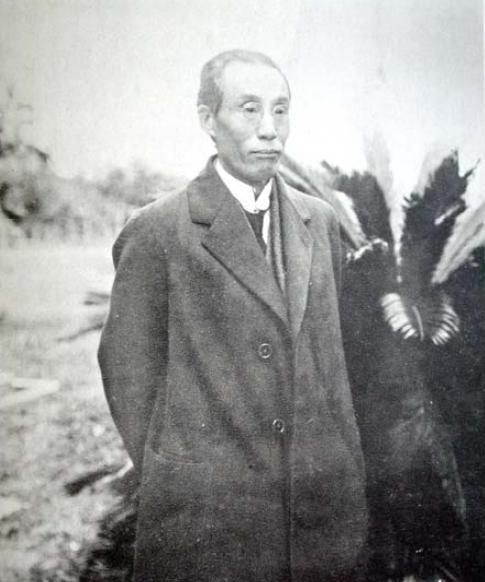
- Bunzō Hayata, 1927
- Born: December 2, 1874; Kamo, Niigata
- Died: January 13, 1934 (aged 59); Tokyo, Japan
- Resting place: Aoyama Cemetery
- Education: Imperial University of Tokyo
- Scientific career
- Fields: Botany
- Workplaces: Imperial University of Tokyo
- Doctoral advisor: Jinzō Matsumura
- Author abbrev. (botany): Hayata

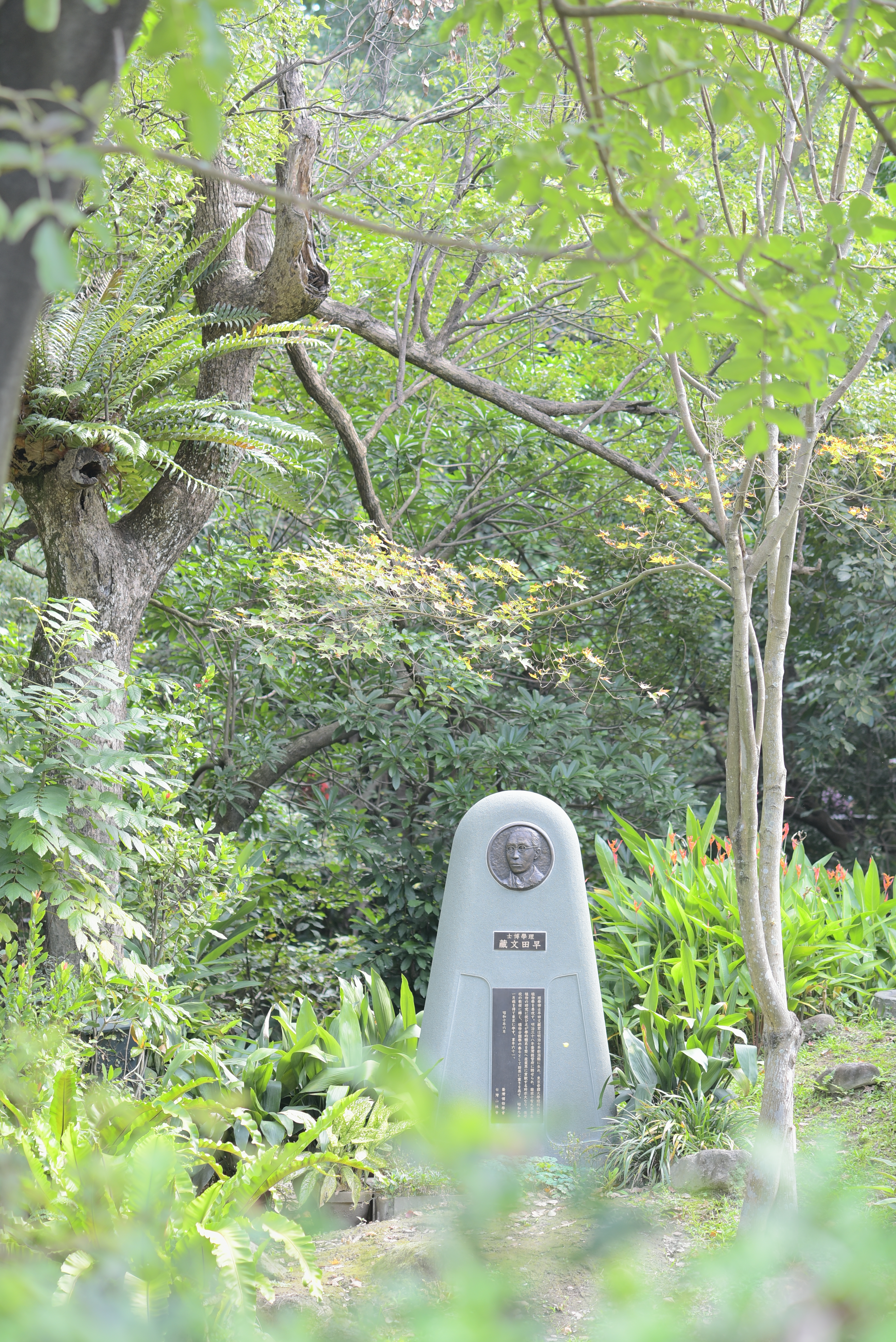
Statue dedicated to Hayata at the Taipei Botanical Garden

Bunzō Hayata (早田 文藏, Hayata Bunzō; December 2, 1874 – January 13, 1934) was a Japanese botanist noted for his taxonomic work in Japan and Japanese Taiwan.

== Early life ==
Hayata was born to a devout Buddhist family in Kamo, Niigata on December 2, 1874. When he was 16, Hayata became interested in botany, and he joined the Botanical Society of Tokyo in 1892. His schooling was delayed by a series of family tragedies, and he graduated middle school at the age of 23. He then attended high school and began to collect botanical samples.

Hayata enrolled in the botany program at the Imperial University of Tokyo in 1900. He graduated in 1903, and entered the graduate program under Jinzō Matsumura. He was appointed assistant at the Koishikawa Botanical Gardens in 1904. In 1907, he completed his Doctor of Sciences degree.

== Career ==
In 1908, Hayata was promoted to lecturer in the Department of Botany at the Imperial University of Tokyo. Hayata undertook a botanical expedition to Tonkin in 1917, and was promoted to Associate Professor of the University of Tokyo in 1919. In 1922, he was promoted to a full professorship as the third Professor of Systematic Botany at the University of Tokyo after the departure of Matsumura. He was appointed director of the botanical garden in 1924. He retired in 1930, and he died in 1934 at the age of 59.

== Legacy ==
Hayata described a total of over 1,600 different taxa, most of which are from Taiwan, but also include plants from Japan, China and Vietnam. From a list of Taiwanese plants currently recognized in the flora of Taiwan in 2003, 549 species, or 14% of Taiwan's flora, were described by Hayata. One example is the species Taiwania cryptomerioides, which Hayata himself saw the discovery of.

== Awards ==
In 1920, the Imperial Academy of Japan awarded Hayata the Prince Katsura Commemoration Prize for his contribution to the flora of Formosa.

== Selected publications ==
Hayata's publications cover a period of more than 30 years, during which he authored more than 150 scientific articles and books.

- 1906: On Taiwania, a new genus of Coniferae from the island of Formosa. In: Botanical Journal of the Linnean Society. Vol. 37, pp. 330–331.
- 1908: Flora Montana Formosae. An enumeration of the plants found on Mt. Morrison, the central chain, and other mountainous regions of Formosa at altitudes of 3,000-13,000 ft. In: J. Coll. Sci. Imperial Univ. Tokyo, Vol. 25, pp. 1–260.
- 1911: Materials for a Flora of Formosa. In: J. Coll. Sci. Imperial Univ. Tokyo, Vol. 30, pp. 1–471.
- 1911–1921: Icones Plantarum Formosanarum . 10 Volumes. Bureau of Productive Industries, Government of Formosa, Taihoku, Taiwan.
- 1921: The Natural Classification of Plants according to the Dynamic System. In: Icones Plantarum Formosanarum. Vol. 10, pp. 97–234.
- 1931: Über das "Dynamische System“ der Pflanzen. In: Berichte der Deutschen botanischen Gesellschaft. Vol. 49, pp. 328–348.
