= Holocheila =

Scientific classification
- Kingdom: Plantae
- Clade: Tracheophytes
- Clade: Angiosperms
- Clade: Eudicots
- Clade: Asterids
- Order: Lamiales
- Family: Lamiaceae
- Subfamily: Lamioideae
- Genus: Holocheila (Kudô) S.Chow
- Species: H. longipedunculata

Binomial name
- Holocheila longipedunculata S.Chow

Synonyms
- Teucrium holocheilum W.E.Evans

Genus of flowering plants

Holocheila is a genus of flowering plant in the family Lamiaceae, first described as a genus in 1962. It contains only one known species, Holocheila longipedunculata. It is endemic to Yunnan Province in China.
