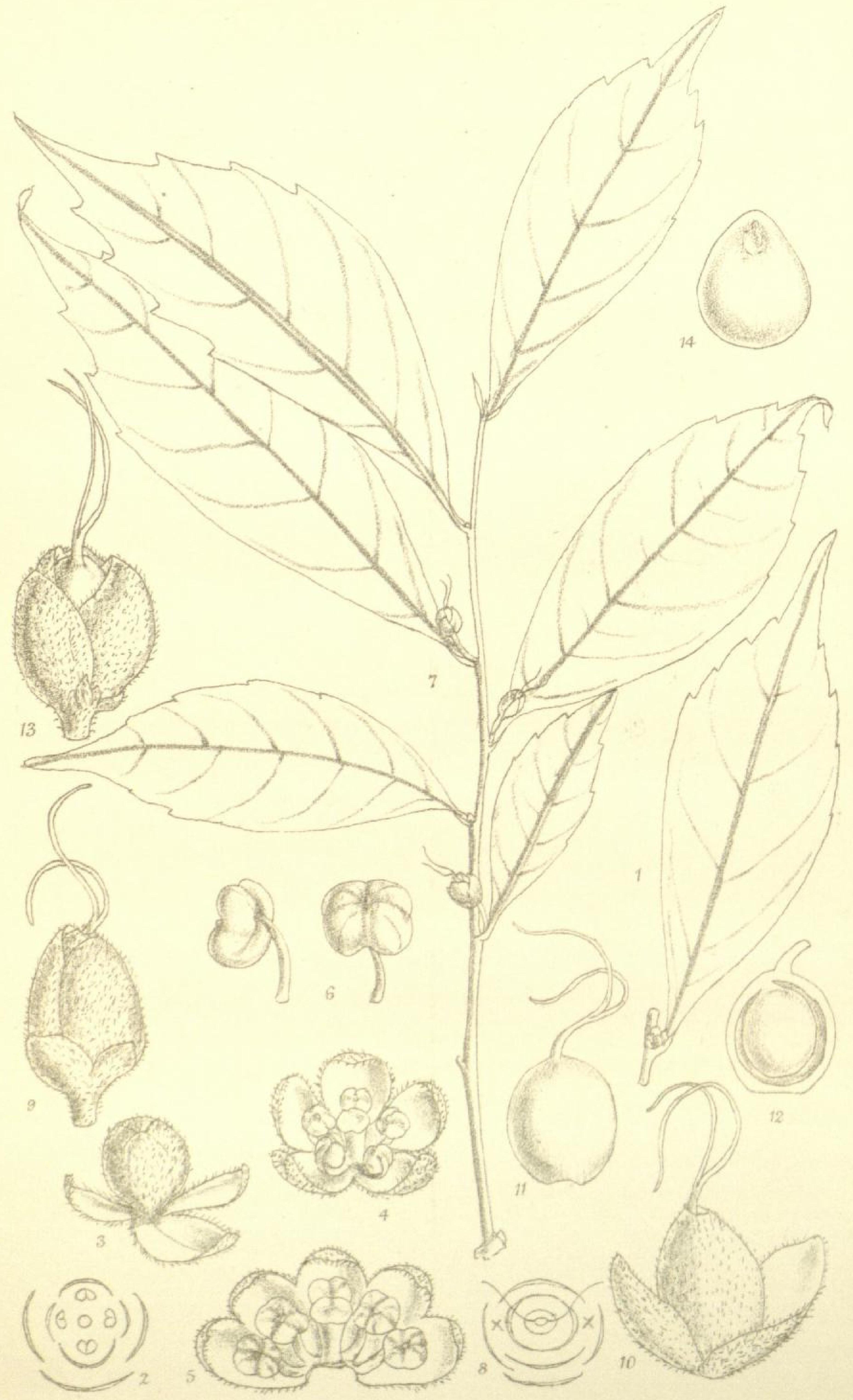

Scientific classification
- Kingdom: Plantae
- Clade: Tracheophytes
- Clade: Angiosperms
- Clade: Eudicots
- Clade: Asterids
- Order: Lamiales
- Family: Lamiaceae
- Genus: Acrymia; Prain
- Species: A. ajugiflora

Binomial name
- Acrymia ajugiflora Prain

= Acrymia =

Genus of flowering plants

Acrymia is a genus of plants in the family Lamiaceae, first described in 1908. Of this genus, only one species is known, Acrymia ajugiflora, found in the Perak and Selangor regions of Malaysia.
