= Cymaria =

Scientific classification
- Kingdom: Plantae
- Clade: Tracheophytes
- Clade: Angiosperms
- Clade: Eudicots
- Clade: Asterids
- Order: Lamiales
- Family: Lamiaceae
- Genus: Cymaria; Benth.

Synonyms
- Anthocoma Zoll. & Moritzi

Genus of flowering plants

Cymaria is a genus of plants in the family Lamiaceae, first described in 1830. It is native to China, New Guinea, and Southeast Asia.

Species

- Cymaria dichotoma Benth. – (syn Cymaria acuminata Decne.) – Hainan, Indochina, Malaysia, Java, Maluku, Philippines, New Guinea
- Cymaria elongata Benth. – Myanmar, Bali, Lombok, Timor
