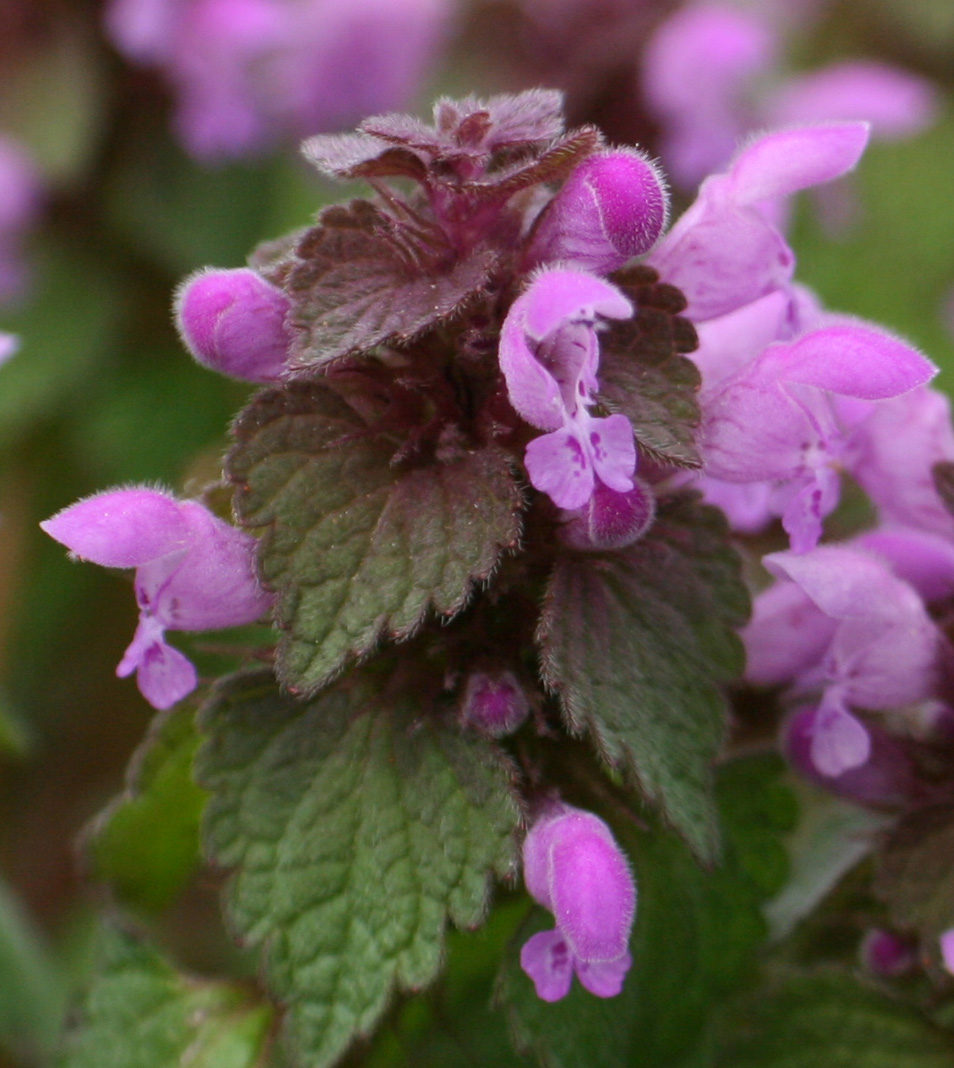
- Lamium purpureum L.

Scientific classification
- Kingdom: Plantae
- Clade: Tracheophytes
- Clade: Angiosperms
- Clade: Eudicots
- Clade: Asterids
- Order: Lamiales
- Family: Lamiaceae; Martinov

Type genus
- Lamium L.

Genera
- See § Genera

Synonyms
- Labiatae Juss.

= Lamiaceae =

Family of flowering plants

Lamiaceae or Labiatae is a family of flowering plants commonly known as mints, deadnettles, or sages. Many species in Lamiaceae are aromatic, and the family includes many widely used culinary herbs like basil, mint, rosemary, sage, savory, marjoram, oregano, hyssop, thyme, lemon balm, lavender, and perilla, as well as traditional medicines such as catnip, skullcap, bee balm, wild dagga, self-heal, and oriental motherwort.

Some species are shrubs, trees (such as teak), or, rarely, vines, but most are herbaceous. Many members of the family are widely cultivated, not only for their aromatic qualities, but also their ease of cultivation through stem cuttings. Many species are cultivated for their aromatic leaves and can have additional edible parts. Some species are grown for seed, such as Salvia hispanica (chia), or for their edible tubers, such as Plectranthus edulis, P. esculentus, P. rotundifolius, and Stachys affinis (Chinese artichoke). Many are also grown ornamentally, notably coleus, Plectranthus, and Salvia species/hybrids.

The mint family as a whole has a cosmopolitan distribution comprising about 236 genera and around 6,900 to 7,200 species. The World Checklist of Selected Plant Families estimates an even larger number with 7,534 species. The largest genera are Salvia (900), Scutellaria (360), Stachys (300), Plectranthus (300), Hyptis (280), Teucrium (250), Vitex (250), Thymus (220), and Nepeta (200). Clerodendrum was once a genus of over 400 species, but by 2010, it had been narrowed to about 150.

The family has traditionally been considered closely related to Verbenaceae; in the 1990s, phylogenetic studies suggested that many genera classified in Verbenaceae should be classified in Lamiaceae or to other families in the order Lamiales.

The alternative family name Labiatae refers to the flowers typically having petals fused into an upper lip and a lower lip (labia in Latin). Although this is still considered an acceptable alternative name, most botanists now use the name Lamiaceae in referring to this family. The flowers are bilaterally symmetrical with five united petals and five united sepals. They are usually bisexual and verticillastrate (a flower cluster that looks like a whorl of flowers, but actually consists of two crowded clusters). The leaves emerge oppositely, each pair at right angles to the previous one (decussate) or whorled. The stems are frequently square in cross section, but this trait is not found in all members of the family, and is sometimes found in other plant families.

== Genera ==
The last revision of the entire family was published in 2004. It described and provided keys to 236 genera. These are marked with an asterisk (*) in the list below. A few genera have been established or resurrected since 2004. These are marked with a plus sign (+). Other genera have been synonymised. These are marked with a minus sign (-). The remaining genera in the list are mostly of historical interest only and are from a source that includes such genera without explanation. Few of these are recognized in modern treatments of the family.

Kew Gardens provides a list of genera that includes additional information. A list at the Angiosperm Phylogeny Website is frequently updated. Plants of the World Online currently accepts 224 genera.

- *Acanthomintha (A.Gray) A.Gray
- Acanthoprasium (Benth.) Spach
- *Achyrospermum Blume
- Acinos Mill., synonym of Clinopodium
- Acrocephalus Benth., synonym of Platostoma
- *Acrotome Benth. ex Endl.
- *Acrymia Prain
- Adelosa Blume, synonym of Clerodendrum
- *Aegiphila Jacq.
- *Aeollanthus C.Mart. ex Spreng.
- *Agastache Clayton ex Gronov.
- *Ajuga L.
- *Ajugoides Makino – synonym of Paraphlomis
- *Alajja Ikonn., synonym of Eriophyton
- *Alvesia Welw.
- *Amasonia L.f.
- *Amethystea L.
- *Anisochilus Wall. ex Benth., synonym of Coleus
- *Anisomeles R.Br.
- Apatelantha T.C.Wilson & Henwood
- *Asterohyptis Epling
- *Ballota L.
- *Basilicum Moench
- Becium Lindl., synonym of Ocimum
- *Benguellia G.Taylor
- Betonica L.
- *Blephilia (L.) Raf.
- *Bostrychanthera Benth., synonym of Chelonopsis
- Bovonia Chiov., synonym of Aeollanthus
- *Brachysola Rye
- *Brazoria Engelm. & A.Gray
- *Bystropogon L'Hér.
- Calamintha L., synonym of Clinopodium
- *Callicarpa L.
- Cantinoa Harley & J.F.B.Pastore
- *Capitanopsis S.Moore
- Capitanya Schweinf. ex Gürke, synonym of Coleus
- *Caryopteris Bunge
- *Catoferia (Benth.) Benth.
- *Cedronella Moench
- Ceratanthus F.Muell. ex G.Taylor, synonym of Platostoma
- *Chaiturus Ehrh. ex Willd.
- *Chamaesphacos Schrenk ex Fisch. & C.A.Mey., synonym of Stachys
- *Chaunostoma Donn.Sm., synonym of Lepechinia
- *Chelonopsis Miq.
- *Chloanthes R.Br.
- *Cleonia L.
- *Clerodendrum L.
- *Clinopodium L.
- *Colebrookea Sm.
- Coleus Lour.
- *Collinsonia L.
- *Colquhounia Wall.
- *Comanthosphace S.Moore
- Condea Adans.
- *Congea Roxb.
- *Conradina A.Gray
- Coridothymus Rchb.f., synonym of Thymbra
- *Cornutia Plum. ex L.
- *Craniotome Rchb.
- *Cryphia R.Br., synonym of Prostanthera
- *Cuminia Colla
- *Cunila D.Royen
- Cyanocephalus (Pohl ex Benth.) Harley & J.F.B.Pastore
- *Cyanostegia Turcz.
- *Cyclotrichium (Boiss.) Manden. & Scheng.
- *Cymaria Benth.
- Dasymalla Endl.
- *Dauphinea Hedge, synonym of Capitanopsis
- *Dicerandra Benth.
- *Dicrastylis Drumm. ex Harv.
- Discretitheca P.D.Cantino
- *Dracocephalum L.
- *Drepanocaryum Pojark.
- *Elsholtzia Willd.
- *Endostemon N.E.Br.
- Englerastrum Briq., synonym of Coleus
- +Eplingiella Harley & J.F.B.Pastore
- Equilabium Mwany., A.J.Paton & Culham
- *Eremostachys Bunge, synonym of Phlomoides
- *Eriope Humb. & Bonpl. ex Benth.
- *Eriophyton Benth.
- Eriopidion Harley
- *Eriothymus (Benth.) Rchb.
- Erythrochlamys Gürke, synonym of Ocimum
- Euhesperida Brullo & Furnari, synonym of Satureja
- *Eurysolen Prain
- *Faradaya F.Muell., synonym of Oxera
- *Fuerstia T.C.E.Fr.
- *Galeopsis L.
- *Garrettia H.R.Fletcher, synonym of Rokohia
- Geniosporum Wall. ex Benth., synonym of Platostoma
- *Glechoma L.
- *Glechon Spreng.
- *Glossocarya Wall. ex Griff.
- *Gmelina L.
- *Gomphostemma Wall. ex Benth.
- *Gontscharovia Boriss.
- Gymneia (Benth.) Harley & J.F.B.Pastore
- *Hanceola Kudô
- *Haplostachys (A.Gray) Hillebr.
- *Haumaniastrum P.A.Duvign. & Plancke
- *Hedeoma Pers.
- Heliacria Bo Li, C.L.Xiang, T.S.Hoang & Nuraliev
- *Hemiandra R.Br.
- *Hemigenia R.Br.
- *Hemiphora (F.Muell.) F.Muell.
- *Hemizygia (Benth.) Briq., synonym of Syncolostemon
- *Hesperozygis Epling
- *Heterolamium C.Y.Wu
- *Hoehnea Epling
- *Holmskioldia Retz.
- *Holocheila (Kudô) S.Chow
- Holostylon Robyns & Lebrun, synonym of Coleus
- *Horminum L.
- *Hosea Ridl.
- *Hoslundia Vahl
- *Huxleya Ewart, synonym of Volkameria
- *Hymenocrater Fisch. & C.A.Mey., synonym of Nepeta
- *Hymenopyramis Wall. ex Griff.
- *Hypenia (Mart. ex Benth.) Harley
- *Hypogomphia Bunge
- *Hyptidendron Harley
- *Hyptis Jacq.
- *Hyssopus L., synonym of Dracocephalum
- Isodictyophorus Briq., synonym of Coleus
- *Isodon (Benth.) Schrad. ex Spach
- *Isoleucas O.Schwartz
- +Kalaharia Baill.
- *Karomia Dop
- Keiskea Miq., synonym of Collinsonia
- Killickia Bräuchler, Heubl & Doroszenko
- Kudrjaschevia Pojark.
- *Kurzamra Kuntze
- *Lachnostachys Hook.
- *Lagochilus Bunge ex Benth.
- *Lagopsis (Bunge ex Benth.) Bunge
- *Lallemantia Fisch. & C.A.Mey., synonym of Dracocephalum
- *Lamiophlomis Kudô, synonym of Phlomoides
- *Lamium L.
- *Lavandula L.
- *Leocus A.Chev., synonym of Coleus
- *Leonotis (Pers.) R.Br.
- *Leonurus L.
- *Lepechinia Willd.
- Leptohyptis Harley & J.F.B.Pastore
- *Leucas R.Br.
- Leucophae Webb & Berthel., synonym of Sideritis
- *Leucosceptrum Sm.
- Limniboza R.E.Fr., synonym of Platostoma
- *Lophanthus Adans., synonym of Nepeta
- *Loxocalyx Hemsl.
- *Lycopus L.
- *Macbridea Elliott ex Nutt.
- *Madlabium Hedge, synonym of Capitanopsis
- *Marmoritis Benth., synonym of Nepeta
- *Marrubium L.
- *Marsypianthes Mart. ex Benth.
- +Martianthus Harley & J.F.B.Pastore
- *Matsumurella Makino, synonym of Paraphlomis
- +Medusantha Harley & J.F.B.Pastore
- *Meehania Britton
- *Melissa L.
- *Melittis L.
- *Mentha L.
- *Meriandra Benth., synonym of Salvia
- Mesona Blume, synonym of Platostoma
- Mesosphaerum P.Browne
- *Metastachydium Airy Shaw ex C.Y.Wu & H.W.Li, synonym of Phlomoides
- *Microcorys R.Br.
- *Micromeria Benth.
- *Microtoena Prain
- *Minthostachys (Benth.) Spach
- *Moluccella L.
- *Monarda L.
- *Monardella Benth.
- *Monochilus Fisch. & C.A.Mey.
- *Mosla (Benth.) Buch.-Ham. ex Maxim.
- Muniria N.Streiber & B.J.Conn
- Neohyptis J.K.Morton, synonym of Coleus
- Neorapinia Moldenke, synonym of Vitex
- *Nepeta L.
- *Newcastelia F.Muell.
- Nosema Prain, synonym of Platostoma
- *Notochaete Benth., synonym of Phlomoides
- *Obtegomeria Doroszenko & P.D.Cantino
- *Ocimum L.
- Octomeron Robyns, synonym of Platostoma
- *Ombrocharis Hand.-Mazz.
- *Oncinocalyx F.Muell., synonym of Teucrium
- Oocephalus (Benth.) Harley & J.F.B.Pastore
- *Origanum L.
- *Orthosiphon Benth.
- *Otostegia Benth.
- +Ovieda L.
- *Oxera Labill.
- *Panzerina Soják
- *Paralamium Dunn
- *Paraphlomis Prain
- *Paravitex H.R.Fletcher, synonym of Vitex
- *Peltodon Pohl, synonym of Hyptis
- *Pentapleura Hand.-Mazz.
- *Perilla L.
- *Perillula Maxim.
- *Peronema Jack
- -Perovskia Kar., synonym of Salvia
- Perrierastrum Guillaumin, synonym of Capitanopsis
- Petitia Jacq.
- *Petraeovitex Oliv.
- *Phlomidoschema (Benth.) Vved.
- *Phlomis L.
- *Phlomoides Moench
- *Phyllostegia Benth.
- Physominthe Harley & J.F.B.Pastore
- *Physopsis Turcz.
- *Physostegia Benth.
- *Piloblephis Raf.
- Pitardia Batt. ex Pit., synonym of Nepeta
- *Pityrodia R.Br.
- *Platostoma P.Beauv.
- *Plectranthus L.Hér.
- *Pogogyne Benth.
- *Pogostemon Desf.
- *Poliomintha A.Gray
- *Prasium L.
- *Premna L.
- *Prostanthera Labill.
- *Prunella L.
- *Pseuderemostachys Popov, synonym of Phlomoides
- *Pseudocarpidium Millsp.
- *Pseudocaryopteris (Briq.) P.D.Cantino
- Pseudochamaesphacos Parsa
- Pseudodictamnus Fabr.
- *Pseudomarrubium Popov, synonym of Phlomoides
- Puntia Hedge, syononym of Endostemon
- *Pycnanthemum Michx.
- *Pycnostachys Hook., synonym of Coleus
- Quoya Gaudich.
- Rabdosiella Codd, synonym of Coleus
- *Renschia Vatke
- *Rhabdocaulon (Benth.) Epling
- *Rhaphiodon Schauer
- *Rhododon Epling
- +Rokohia Z.H.Feng & U.B.Deshmukh
- -Rosmarinus L., synonym of Salvia
- *Rostrinucula Kudô
- *Rotheca Raf.
- *Roylea Wall. ex Benth.
- *Rubiteucris Kudô
- +Rydingia Scheen & V.A.Albert
- Sabaudia Buscal. & Muschl., synonym of Lavandula
- *Saccocalyx Coss. & Durieu
- Salazaria Torr., synonym of Scutellaria
- *Salvia L.
- *Satureja L.
- *Schizonepeta (Benth.) Briq.
- *Schnabelia Hand.-Mazz.
- *Scutellaria L.
- *Sideritis L.
- *Siphocranion Kudô
- Solenostemon Thonn., synonym of Coleus
- *Spartothamnella Briq., synonym of Teucrium
- *Sphenodesme Jack
- *Stachydeoma Small
- *Stachyopsis Popov & Vved., synonym of Eriophyton
- *Stachys L.
- *Stenogyne Benth.
- *Sulaimania Hedge & Rech.f., synonym of Moluccella
- *Suzukia Kudô
- *Symphorema Roxb.
- Symphostemon Hiern, synonym of Coleus
- *Synandra Nutt.
- *Syncolostemon E.Mey. ex Benth.
- *Tectona L.f.
- *Teijsmanniodendron Koord.
- +Tetraclea A.Gray
- *Tetradenia Benth.
- *Teucridium Hook.f., synonym of Teucrium
- *Teucrium L.
- *Thorncroftia N.E.Br.
- *Thuspeinanta T.Durand, synonym of Stachys
- *Thymbra L.
- *Thymus L.
- *Tinnea Kotschy ex Hook.f.
- *Trichostema L.
- *Tripora P.D.Cantino
- *Tsoongia Merr., synonym of Vitex
- *Vitex L.
- *Viticipremna H.J.Lam, synonym of Vitex
- +Volkameria L.
- +Vuhuangia J.S.Raju, Molinari & Mayta
- *Warnockia M.W.Turner
- *Wenchengia C.Y.Wu & S.Chow
- *Westringia Sm.
- Wiedemannia Fisch. & C.A.Mey., synonym of Lamium
- *Wrixonia F.Muell., synonym of Prostanthera
- Xenopoma Willd., synonym of Clinopodium
- *Zataria Boiss.
- *Ziziphora L.

== Recent changes ==
The circumscription of several genera has changed since 2004. Tsoongia, Paravitex, and Viticipremna have been sunk into synonymy with Vitex. Huxleya has been sunk into Volkameria. Kalaharia, Volkameria, Ovieda, and Tetraclea have been segregated from a formerly polyphyletic Clerodendrum. Rydingia has been separated from Leucas. The remaining Leucas is paraphyletic over four other genera.

== Subfamilies and tribes ==
In 2004, the Lamiaceae were divided into seven subfamilies, plus 10 genera not placed in any of the subfamilies. The unplaced genera were: Tectona, Callicarpa, Hymenopyramis, Petraeovitex, Peronema, Garrettia, Cymaria, Acrymia, Holocheila, and Ombrocharis. The subfamilies are the Symphorematoideae, Viticoideae, Ajugoideae, Prostantheroideae, Nepetoideae, Scutellarioideae, and Lamioideae. The subfamily Viticoideae is probably not monophyletic. The Prostantheroideae, Nepetoideae, Ajugoideae, and Lamioideae are divided into tribes. These are shown in the phylogenetic trees below.

By 2026, the APG system has recognized 12 subfamilies; now, Callicarpa is classified in subfam. Callicarpoideae, Acrymia and Cymaria in subfam. Cymarioideae, Holocheila in subfam. Lamioideae, Ombrocharis in subfam. Nepetoideae, Garretia, Hymenopyramis, Peronema and Petraeovitex in subfam. Peronematoideae and Tectona in subfam. Tectonoideae.

== Phylogeny ==
Most of the genera of Lamiaceae have never been sampled for DNA for molecular phylogenetic studies. Most of those that have been are included in the following phylogenetic tree. The phylogeny depicted below is based on seven different sources.

- Lamiaceae
  - Callicarpa
  - Tectona
  - Viticoideae (pro parte)
    - Gmelina
    - Premna
  - Viticoideae (pro parte)
    Vitex
  - Symphorematoideae
    - Congea
    - Symphorema
  - Ajugoideae
    - Rotheca
    - - Teucrium
      - - Ajuga
        - - - Oxera
            - Faradaya
          - - Kalaharia
            - - Clerodendrum
              - - Volkameria
                - - Ovieda
                  - Aegiphila
                  - Tetraclea
                  - Amasonia
  - Prostantheroideae
    - Chloantheae
      Chloanthes
    - Westringieae
      - Prostanthera
      - Westringia
  - Nepetoideae
    - Ocimeae
      - Lavandula
      - Siphocranion
      - - Isodon
        - Hanceola
        - Hyptis
        - - - Orthosiphon
            - Ocimum
          - - Plectranthus
            - Coleus
    - Elsholtzieae
      - Elsholtzia
      - Perilla
    - Mentheae
      - - Lepechinia
        - Salvia
        - Rosmarinus
      - - - Prunella
          - - Nepeta
            - Dracocephalum
            - Agastache
        - - - Origanum
            - Thymus
          - - Mentha
            - - Satureja
              - - Clinopodium
                - Bystropogon
              - - Pycnanthemum
                - Monarda
              - - Dicerandra
                - Conradina
  - - Scutellarioideae
      - Holmskioldia
      - Scutellaria
    - Lamioideae
      - Pogostemon
      - - Phlomis
        - Lamium
        - - Stachys
          - Sideritis
          - - Haplostachys
            - - Stenogyne
              - Phyllostegia
        - Leonurus
        - Marrubium
        - Moluccella
        - - Rydingia
          - - Leucas
            - Leonotis

Some more recent studies have focused on clarifying the subfamilial relationships within the family using large chloroplast gene datasets with largely congruent results.

Li et al. 2016 (dataset D270)

- Lamiaceae
  - - Subfamily Prostantheroideae
      - Tribe Westringieae
      - Tribe Chloantheae
    - Callicarpa
  - - - Subfamily Symphorematoideae
      - Subfamily Viticoideae
    - Subfamily Nepetoideae
      - Tribe Elsholtzieae
      - - Tribe Ocimeae
        - Tribe Mentheae
    - - Tectona
      - - Subfamily Premnoideae
        - Subfamily Ajugoideae
        - - Subfamily Peronematoideae
          - - Subfamily Scutellarioideae
            - - Subfamily Cymarioideae
              - Subfamily Lamioideae
                - Tribe Pogostemoneae
                - - Tribe Gomphostemmateae
                  - - Tribe Synandreae
                    - - Tribe Stachydeae
                      - - Tribe Paraphlomideae
                        - - Tribe Phlomideae
                          - - Tribe Leonureae
                            - - Tribe Marrubieae
                              - - Tribe Lamieae
                                - Tribe Leucadeae

Zhao et al. 2021

- Lamiaceae
  - - Subfamily Prostantheroideae
      - Tribe Westringieae
      - Tribe Chloantheae
    - Subfamily Callicarpoideae
  - - Subfamily Nepetoideae
      - Tribe Mentheae
      - - Tribe Ocimeae
        - Tribe Elsholtzieae
    - - - Subfamily Symphorematoideae
        - Subfamily Viticoideae
      - - Subfamily Tectonoideae
        - - Subfamily Premnoideae
          - - Subfamily Ajugoideae
              - Tribe Rotheceae
              - - Tribe Teucrieae
                - - Tribe Ajugeae
                  - Tribe Clerodendreae
            - - Subfamily Peronematoideae
              - - Subfamily Scutellarioideae
                - - Subfamily Cymarioideae
                  - Subfamily Lamioideae
                    - Tribe Pogostemoneae
                    - - Tribe Gomphostemmateae
                      - - Tribe Colquhounieae
                        - - Tribe Synandreae
                          - - - Tribe Stachydeae
                              - - Tribe Galeopseae
                                - Tribe Betoniceae
                            - - Tribe Paraphlomideae
                              - - Tribe Phlomideae
                                - - Tribe Leonureae
                                  - - Tribe Marrubieae
                                    - - Tribe Leucadeae
                                      - Tribe Lamieae

== Gallery ==
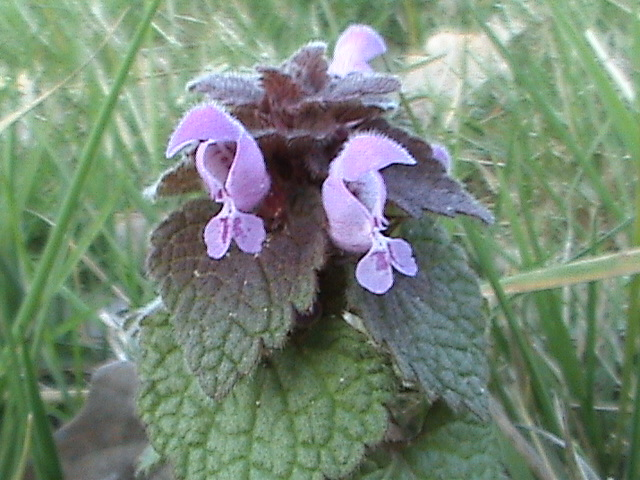
Lamium purpureum, showing the bilaterally symmetrical flower

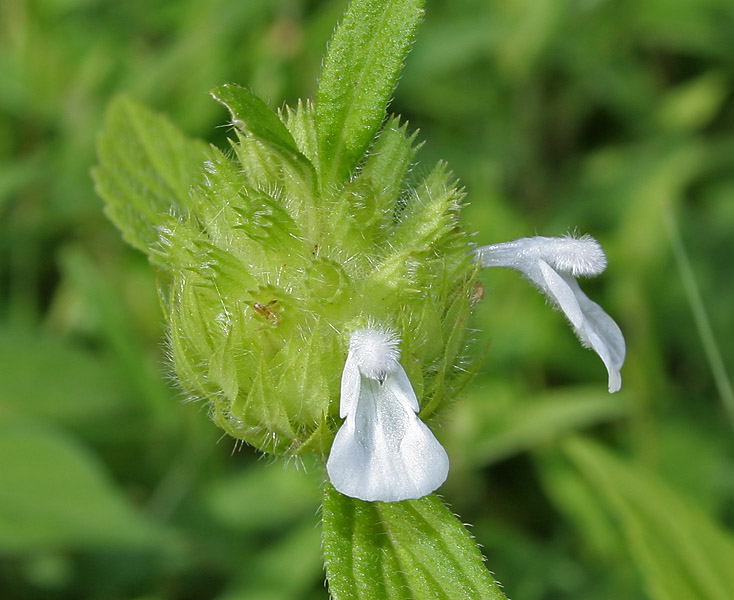
Leucas aspera in Hyderabad, India

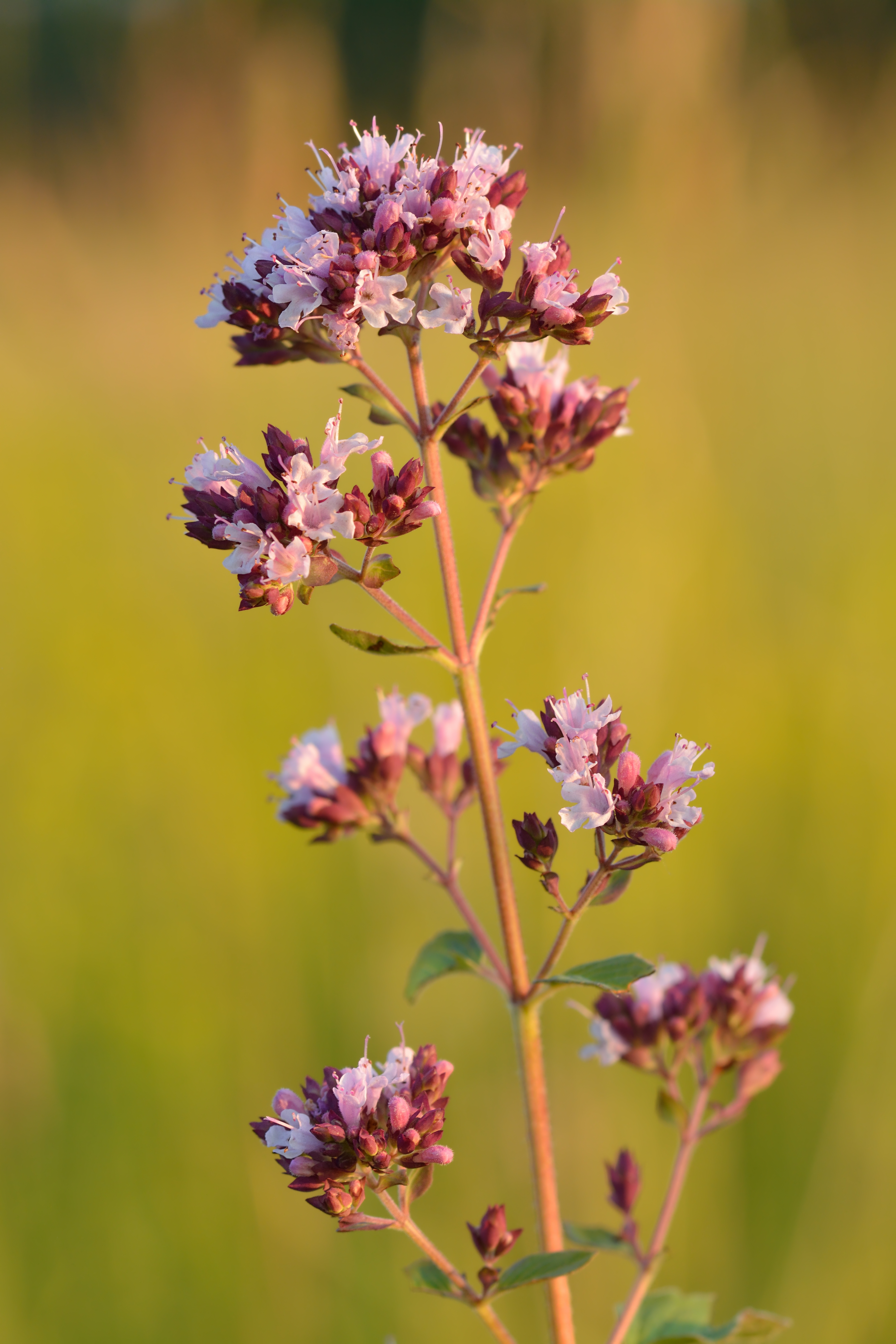
Oregano

Orthosiphon thymiflorus flower

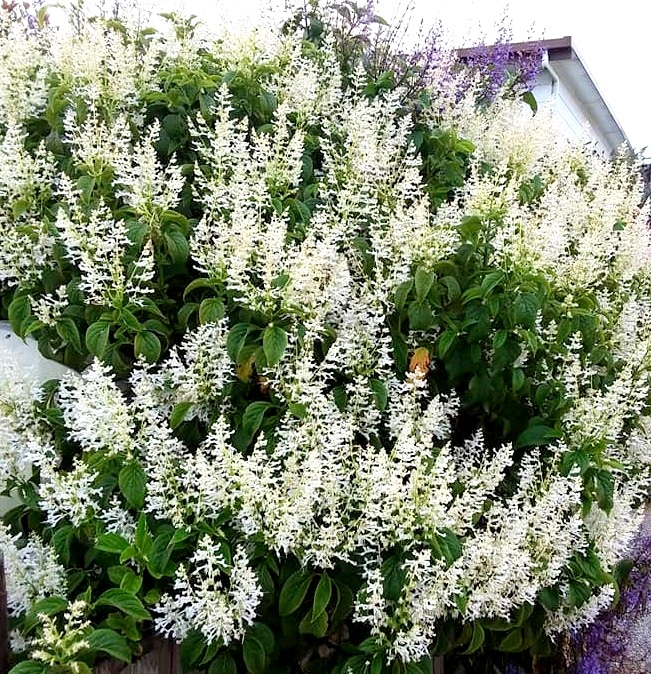
Plectranthus ecklonii

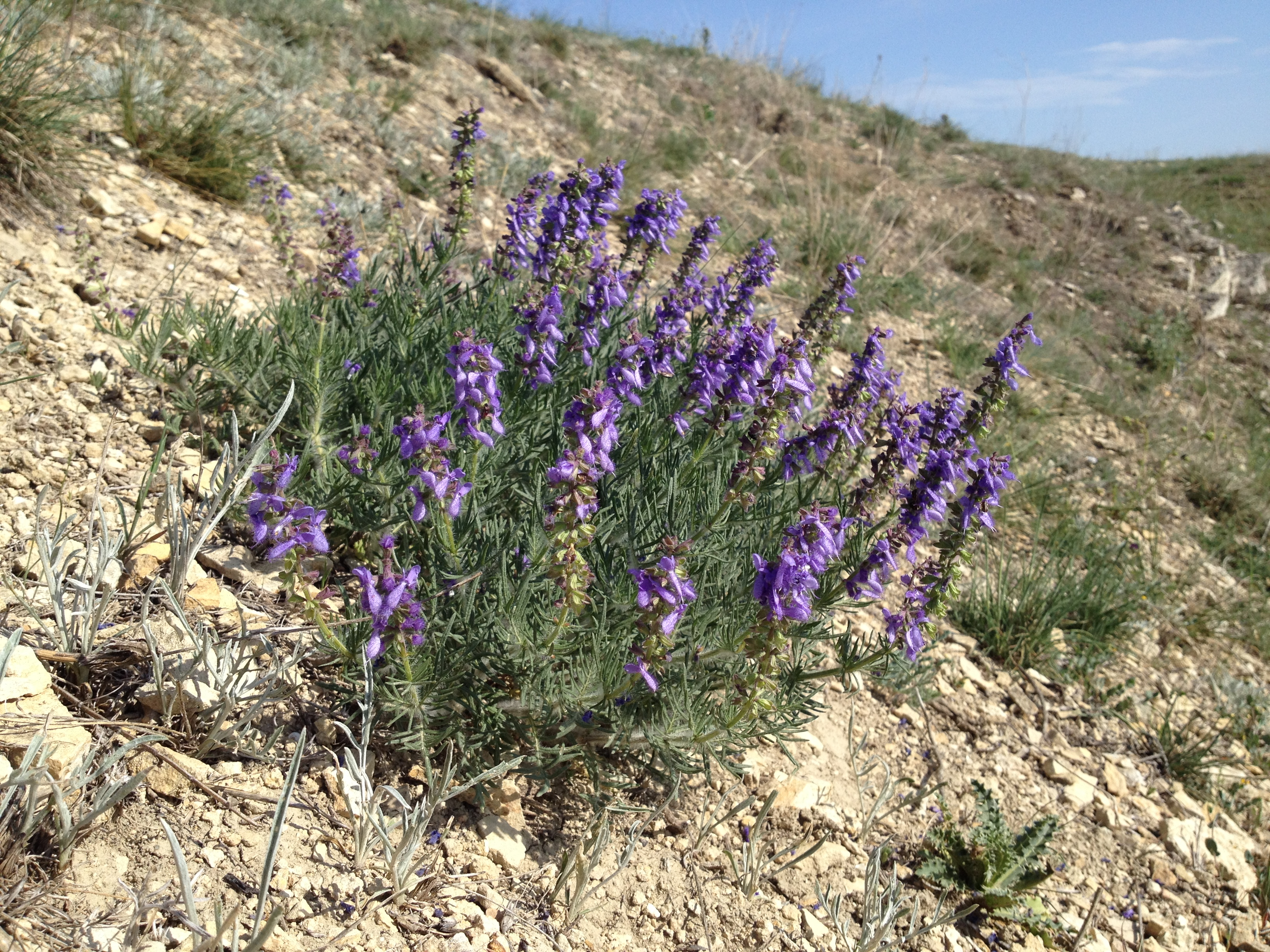
Salvia jurisicii

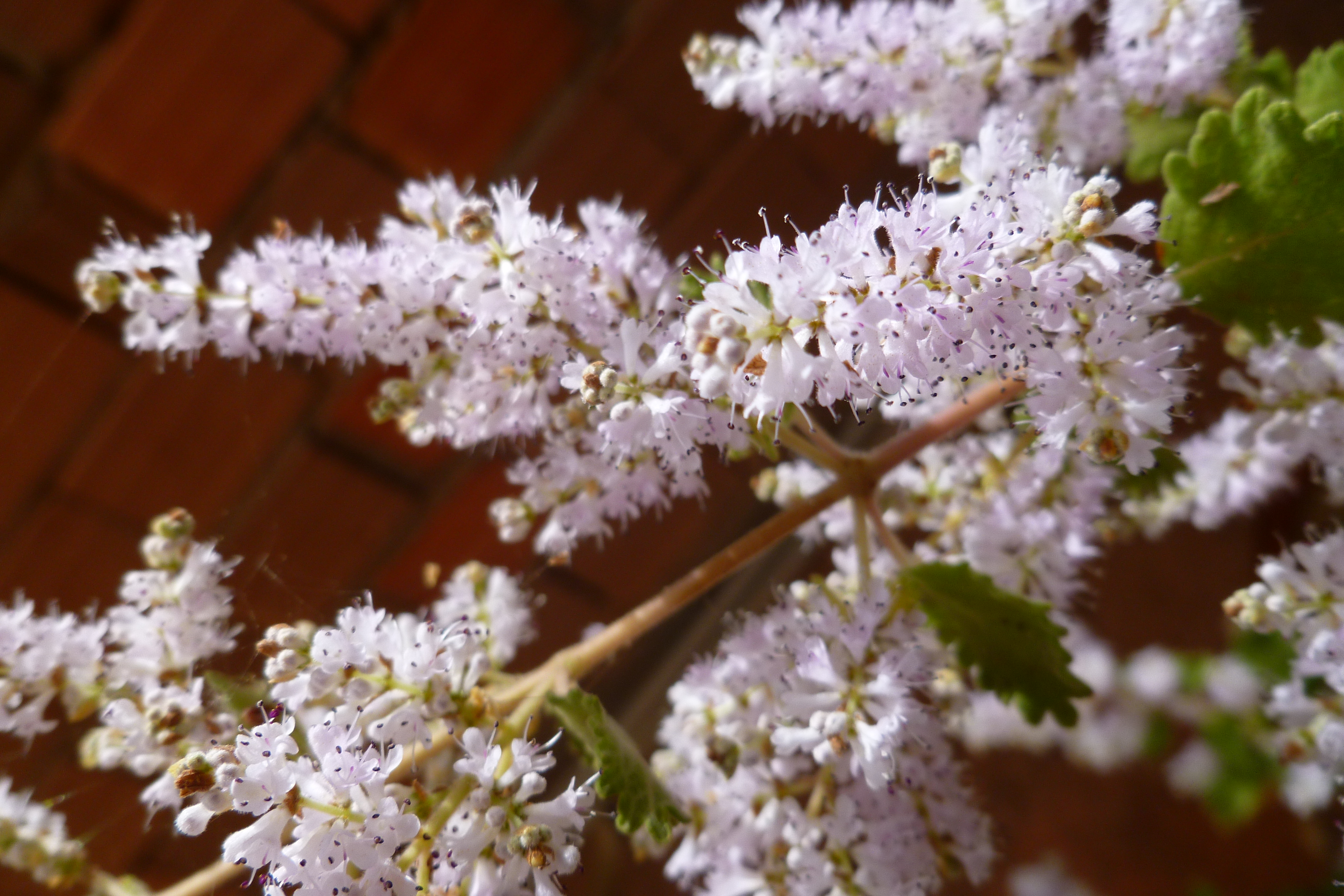
Tetradenia riparia
