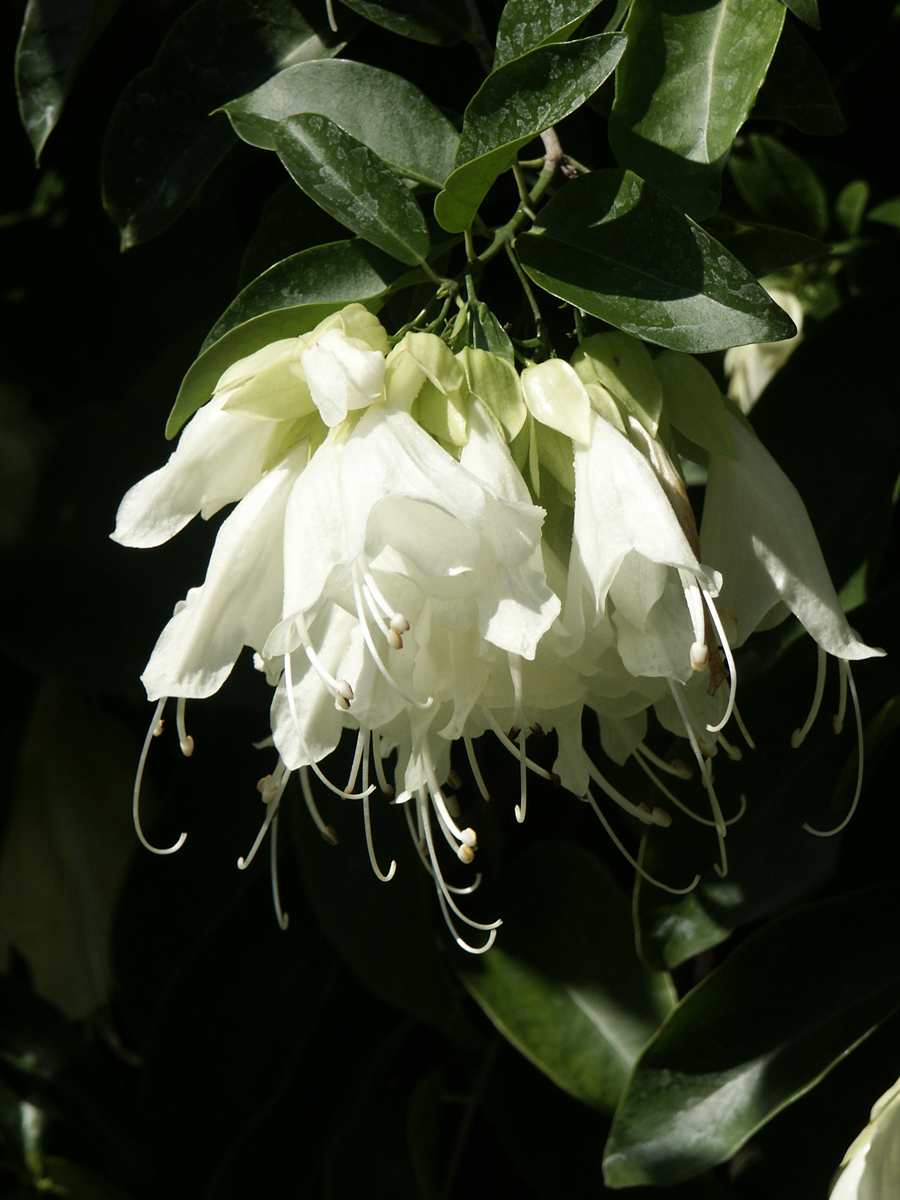
- Oxera pulchella

Scientific classification
- Kingdom: Plantae
- Clade: Tracheophytes
- Clade: Angiosperms
- Clade: Eudicots
- Clade: Asterids
- Order: Lamiales
- Family: Lamiaceae
- Subfamily: Ajugoideae
- Genus: Oxera; Labill.

Type species
- Oxera pulchella Labill.

Synonyms
- Oncoma Spreng.; Borya Montrouz. ex Beauvis. 1901 not Labill. 1805 nor Willd. 1806; Faradaya F.Muell.; Maoutia Montrouz., non Maoutia Wedd.; Schizopremna Baill.

= Oxera =

Genus of flowering plants

Oxera is a genus of flowering plants in the family Lamiaceae native to islands in the southwestern Pacific and Australia.

== Description ==
Species of Oxera show a variety of growth forms, including lianas, shrubs and trees. The leaves are simple, and are petiolate (on short stalks), except in O. sessilifolia, with entire or occasionally sinuate (wavy) edges.

The inflorescences are loose thyrses of flowers, growing from leaf axils (axillary) or directly from the stem (cauliflory). The flowers are large, conspicuous and bisexual; the calyx is actinomorphic (rotationally symmetrical), but the corolla is zygomorphic, sometimes strongly so. Although some species have four stamens in each flower, they are usually reduced in number with two stamens, usually the posterior pair, forming staminodes instead.

== Distribution ==
Twenty of the twenty-one species are found on the island of Grande Terre (the main island of New Caledonia). Three species occur on the adjacent island of Île des Pins, two on Lifou and one on Maré in the Loyalty Islands, and two on Vanuatu (including one introduced species).

Oxera vanuatuensis is only known from Vanuatu, where it is only known from cultivated specimens. Villagers on Pentecost Island (and their descendants on Maewo call the tree harongmau, and propagate the species by planting seeds, transplanting seedlings or taking cuttings. The plant is thought to treat illnesses caused by black magic, and profuse flowering from the trunk is thought to foretell a good harvest of yams.

== Species ==
Twenty-one species are recognised in the genus Oxera, in five informal species groups: (Note: All species are endemic to Grande Terre unless otherwise noted. Conservation statuses follow the IUCN Red List: EN = endangered species; VU = vulnerable species; LC = Least Concern.)

baladica group

- Oxera baladica Vieill.
- Oxera sessilifolia Dubard
- Oxera subverticillata Vieill.
- Oxera vanuatuensis de Kok – Vanuatu

robusta group

- Oxera coriacea Dubard
- Oxera coronata de Kok
- Oxera palmatinervia Dubard
- Oxera robusta Vieill.

pulchella group

- Oxera balansae Dubard – Grande Terre, Île des Pins, Lifou
- Oxera brevicalyx (Moldenke) de Kok
- Oxera crassifolia Virot
- Oxera morierei Vieill.
- Oxera pulchella Labill.

sulfurea group

- Oxera gmelinoides S. Moore
- Oxera microcalyx Guillaumin
- Oxera rugosa Guillaumin
- Oxera sulfurea Dubard – Grand Terre, Île des Pins, Lifou, Maré

macrocalyx group

- Oxera glandulosa Vieill. – New Caledonia, Île des Pins
- Oxera neriifolia (Montrouz.) Beauvis. (Note: Although "O. neriifolia" was treated as a nomen dubium by de Kok (1999), it has since been accepted as the valid name for the species named "Oxera inodora" by de Kok.)
- Oxera macrocalyx Dubard
- Oxera oreophila Guillaumin

== Taxonomic history ==
The genus Oxera was erected by French voyager and botanist Jacques Labillardière in 1824, based on a single specimen that he had collected in New Caledonia. The closest relative of Oxera is the genus Faradaya, and the two genera were once united as the tribe Oxereae. Collectively, they are the sister group to a clade containing Clerodendrum and a number of segregate genera such as Kalaharia, Huxleya, Amasonia and Tetraclea. Both genera are now treated as members of the subfamily Teucrioideae, following work published by Philip D. Cantino in 1992.
