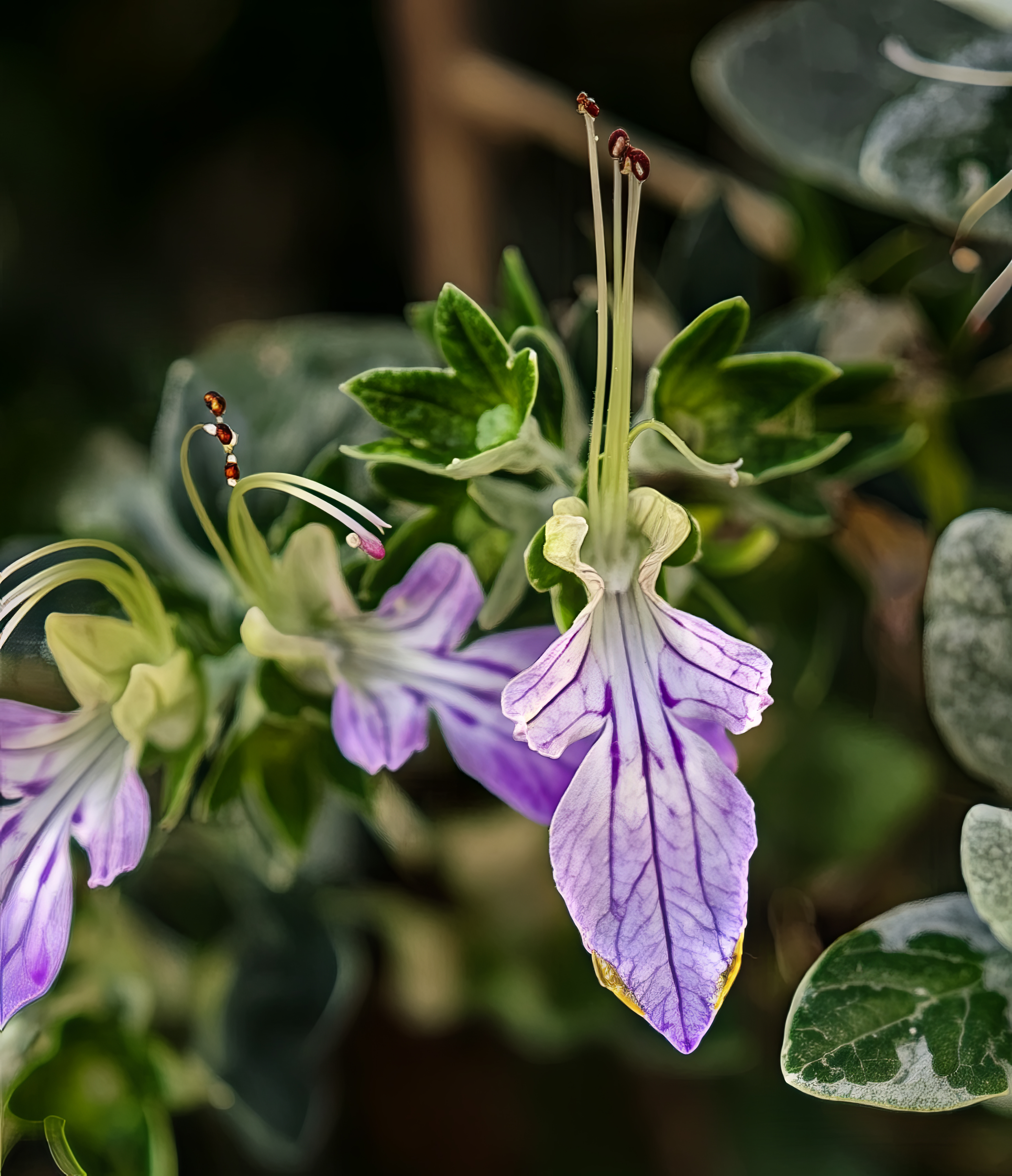
- Teucrium fruticans

Scientific classification
- Kingdom: Plantae
- Clade: Tracheophytes
- Clade: Angiosperms
- Clade: Eudicots
- Clade: Asterids
- Order: Lamiales
- Family: Lamiaceae
- Subfamily: Ajugoideae; Luerss.

Type genus
- Ajuga L.

Genera
- See text Sources: UniProt, GRIN

Synonyms
- Teucrioideae Caruel

= Ajugoideae =

Subfamily of flowering plants in the sage family

Ajugoideae is subfamily of the family Lamiaceae. The subfamily name of Teucrioideae is a synonym of Ajugoideae.

== Genera ==
- Tribe Ajugeae
  - Acrymia Prain
  - Ajuga L.
  - Cymaria Benth.
  - Garrettia H. R. Fletcher
  - Holocheila
- All others
  - Aegiphila Jacq.
  - Amasonia L.f.
  - Amethystea L.
  - Caryopteris Bunge
  - Clerodendrum L.
  - Discretitheca P. D. Cantino
  - Faradaya F. Muell.
  - Glossocarya Wall. ex Griff.
  - Hosea Ridl.
  - Kalaharia Baill.
  - Karomia Dop.
  - Monochilus Fisch. & C. A. Mey.
  - Oncinocalyx F. Muell.
  - Ovieda L.
  - Oxera Labill.
  - Pseudocaryopteris (Briq.) P. D. Cantino
  - Rotheca Raf.
  - Rubiteucris Kudô
  - Schnabelia Hand.-Mazz.
  - Spartothamnella Briq.
  - Tetraclea A. Gray
  - Teucridium Hook. f.
  - Teucrium L.
  - Trichostema L.
  - Tripora P. D. Cantino
  - Volkameria L.

Sources: UniProt, GRIN
