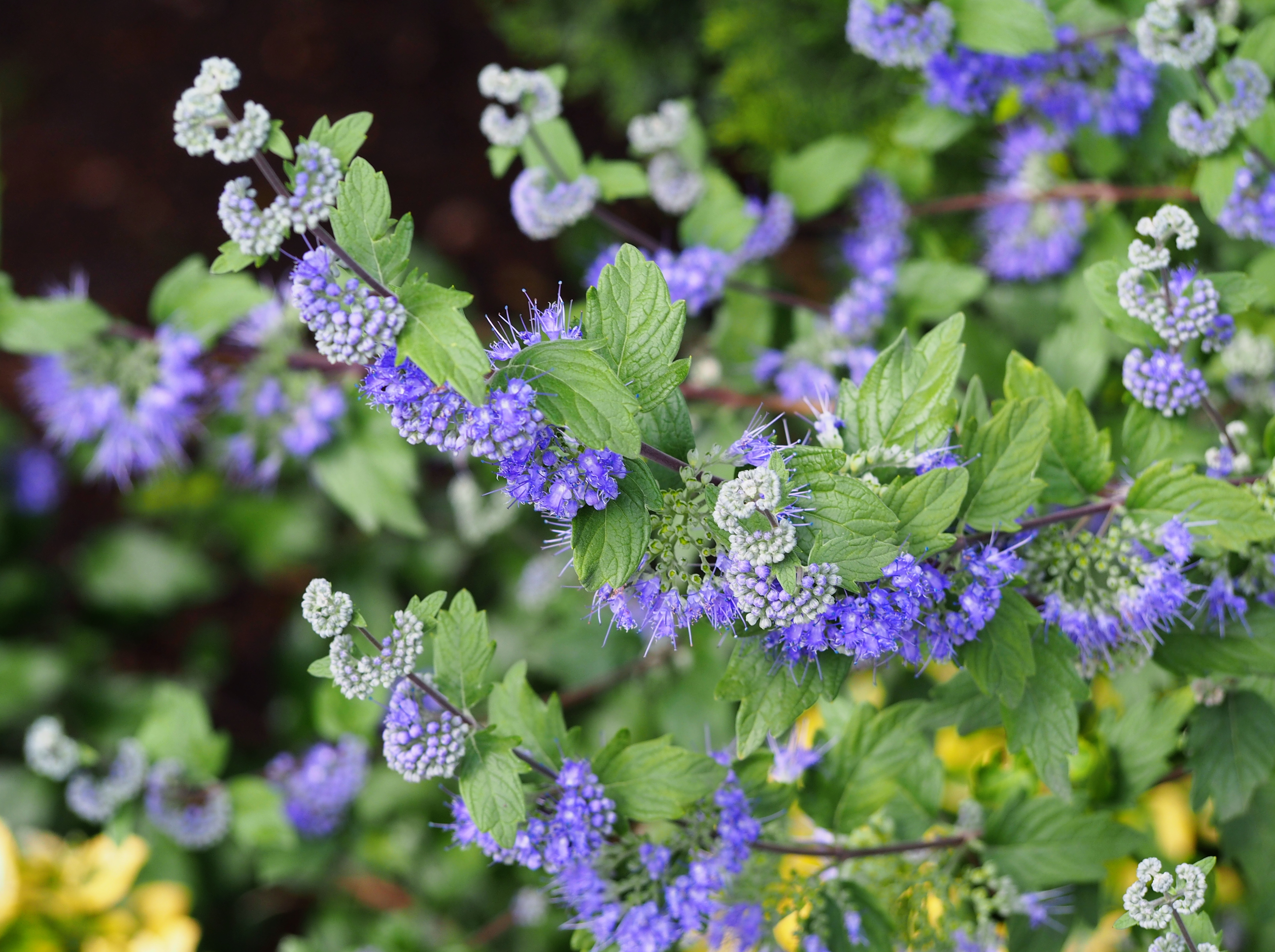
- 'Heavenly Blue' cultivar
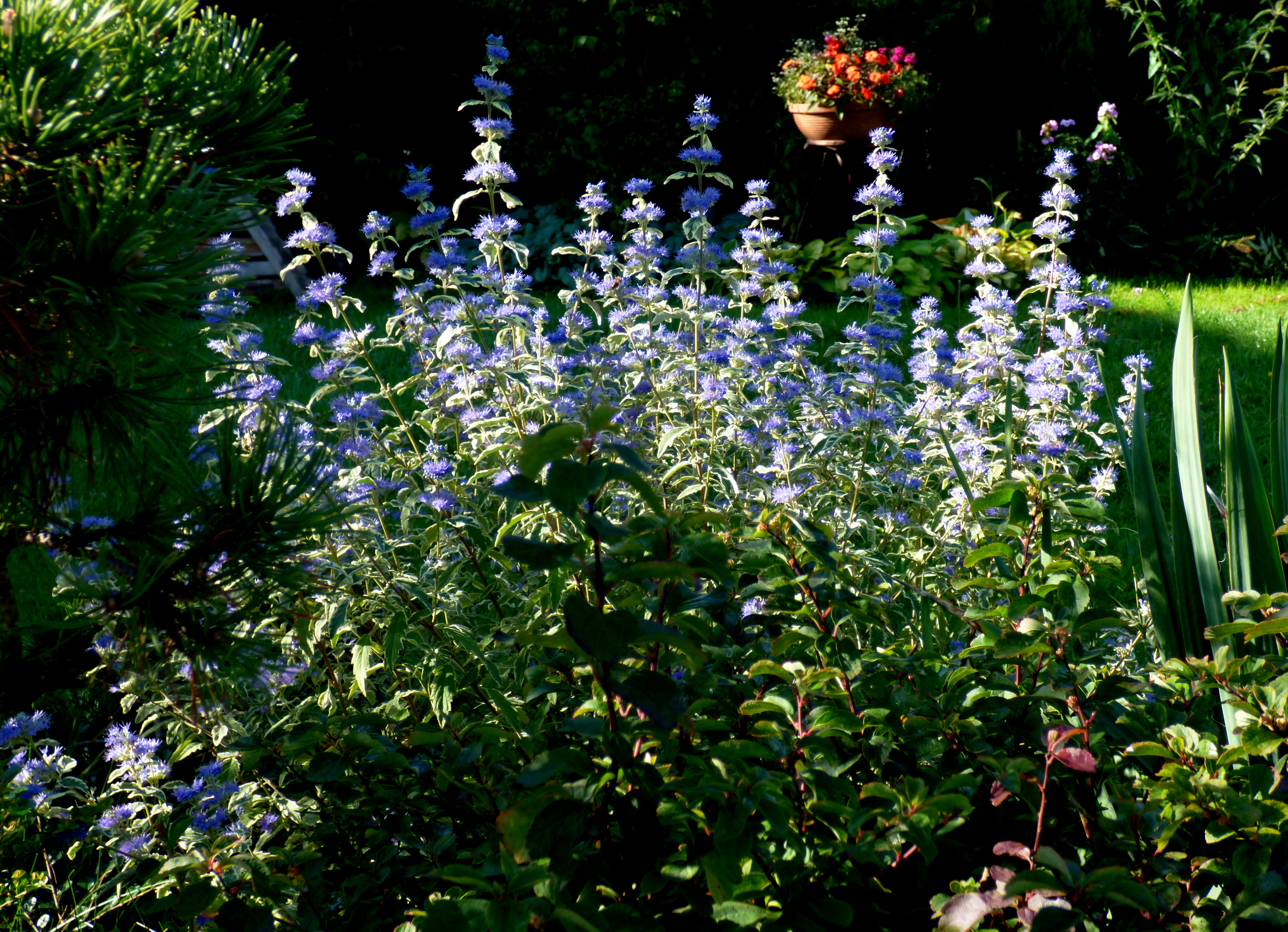
- Habit

Scientific classification
- Kingdom: Plantae
- Clade: Tracheophytes
- Clade: Angiosperms
- Clade: Eudicots
- Clade: Asterids
- Order: Lamiales
- Family: Lamiaceae
- Genus: Caryopteris
- Species: C. × clandonensis

Binomial name
- Caryopteris × clandonensis A.Simmonds

Synonyms
- Caryopteris mastacanthus var. clandonensis (A.Simmonds) C.H.Curtis

= Caryopteris × clandonensis =

Species of plant

Caryopteris × clandonensis, the bluebeard, blue mist, blue-mist shrub, or blue spirea, is an artificial hybrid species of flowering plant in the family Lamiaceae. Its parents are Caryopteris incana (from southern China, Taiwan, Korea, and Japan) and Caryopteris mongholica (from southern Siberia, Mongolia, and northern China). A deciduous shrub reaching 1 m (3 ft), it has a number of cultivars, with seven having gained the Royal Horticultural Society's Award of Garden Merit.

== Cultivars ==
The following cultivars have gained the RHS Award of Garden Merit:

- 'Arthur Simmonds'
- 'First Choice'
- 'Heavenly Baby'
- 'Lisaura' trade designation Hint of Gold
- 'Lissilv' trade designation Sterling Silver
- 'Summer Sorbet' (varigated)
- 'Worcester Gold'

The following additional cultivars are readily available from commercial suppliers:

- 'Dark Knight' (1.2m tall)
- 'Heavenly Blue'
- 'Inoveris' trade designation Grand Bleu
- 'Kew Blue'
- 'Lisspin' trade designation Pink Perfection
- 'Lissteph' trade designation Stephi
- 'White Surprise' (varigated)
