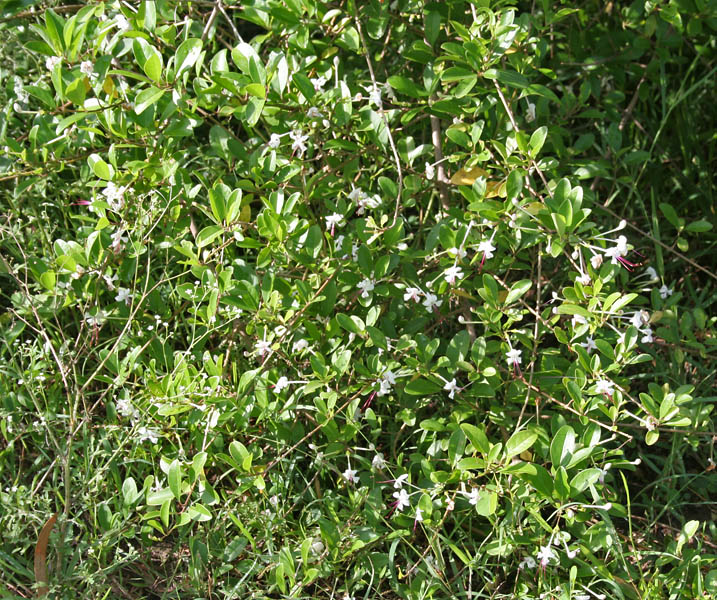
- Volkameria inermis

Scientific classification
- Kingdom: Plantae
- Clade: Tracheophytes
- Clade: Angiosperms
- Clade: Eudicots
- Clade: Asterids
- Order: Lamiales
- Family: Lamiaceae
- Subfamily: Ajugoideae
- Genus: Volkameria; L.

Type species
- Volkameria aculeata L.

Synonyms
- Douglassia Mill.; Cornacchinia Savi; Huxleya Ewart & B.Rees

= Volkameria =

Genus of flowering plants

Volkameria is a genus of flowering plants in the family Lamiaceae. It is pantropical in distribution. Many of the species are found in coastal habitats.

The species of Volkameria are mostly shrubs, sometimes subshrubs or lianas, rarely small trees. The stems have swollen nodes. The flowers are usually fragrant. The fruit matures black or brown, separating into four corky pyrenes.

Volkameria aculeata and Volkameria glabra are grown as ornamentals in the tropics. Volkameria heterophylla is also known in cultivation. Volkameria inermis is planted as a sand binder.

== Taxonomy ==
Volkameria was originally named (as "Volcameria") by German botanist Lorenz Heister in Index plantarum rariorum (1730), the name subsequently being adopted by Swedish scientist Carl Linnaeus and validly published in his Species Plantarum (1753). Heister named the genus after the German botanist Johann Georg Volckamer the Younger (1662-1744), who had described the plant in his Flora Noribergensis (1700).

In 1895, John Isaac Briquet defined the genus Clerodendrum broadly, to include all of those species now placed in Rotheca, Clerodendrum, Volkameria, and Ovieda. This was considered questionable by many, but for the next 100 years, Briquet's circumscription was usually followed, mostly because of confusion and uncertainty regarding this group of at least 200 species.

In 2010, a molecular phylogenetic analysis of DNA sequences showed that most of the Clerodendrum species that had been in Volkameria were more closely related to Aegiphila, Ovieda, Tetraclea, and Amasonia than to other species of Clerodendrum. (See the phylogenetic tree at Lamiaceae). Following these results, Volkameria was reinstated. Some species that had been erroneously placed in Volkameria were excluded. Some of the poorly known species in Clerodendrum might still need to be transferred to Volkameria.

=== Species ===
The following species are recognised in the genus Volkameria:

- Volkameria acerbiana Vis. - northeastern Africa from Egypt to Tanzania and west to Chad; also Guinea-Bissau + Gambia in West Africa
- Volkameria aculeata L. - West Indies, northern South America, Honduras, Veracruz State in eastern Mexico
- Volkameria aggregata (Gürke) Mabb. & Y.W.Yuan - Madagascar
- Volkameria glabra (E.Mey.) Mabb. & Y.W.Yuan - western + southern Africa from South Africa to Somalia; Seychelles, Comoros
- Volkameria heterophylla Poir. - Mauritius, Réunion; naturalized in India, Madagascar, Australia
- Volkameria inermis L. - China, Indian Subcontinent, Australia, Pacific Islands
- Volkameria ligustrina Jacq. - Mexico, Central America
- Volkameria linifolia (Ewart & B.Rees) Mabb. & Y.W.Yuan - Australia (Northern Territory)
- Volkameria mollis (Kunth) Mabb. & Y.W.Yuan - Panama, Colombia, Ecuador, Peru, Galápagos
- Volkameria pittieri (Moldenke) Mabb. & Y.W.Yuan - Guatemala, Nicaragua, Costa Rica, Panama, Colombia, Venezuela, Ecuador

== Gallery ==
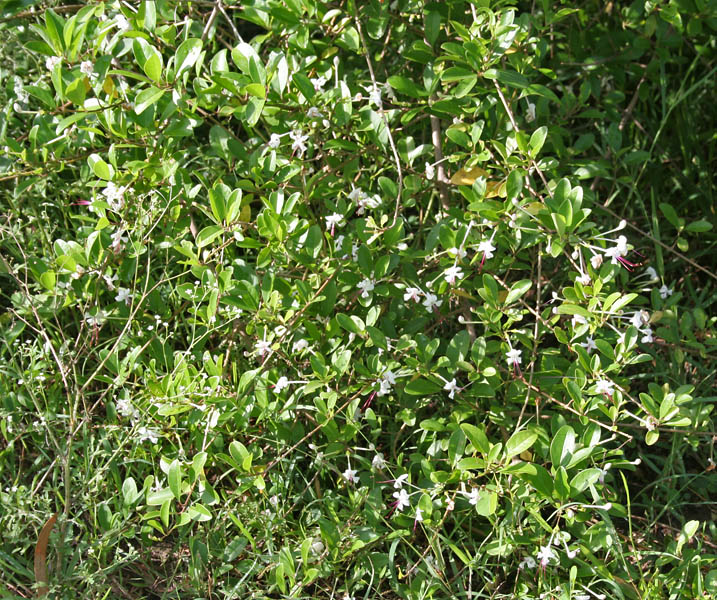
Volkameria inermis in Hyderabad, India.

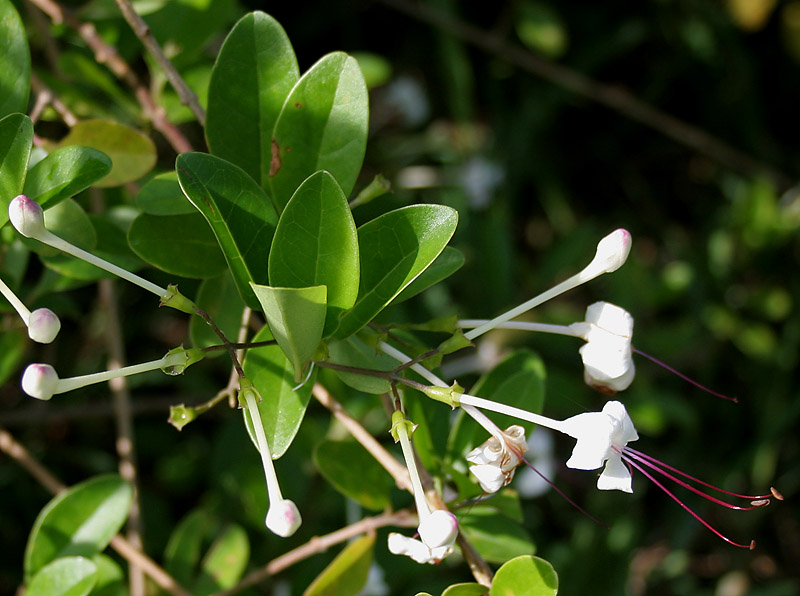
Volkameria inermis in Hyderabad, India.

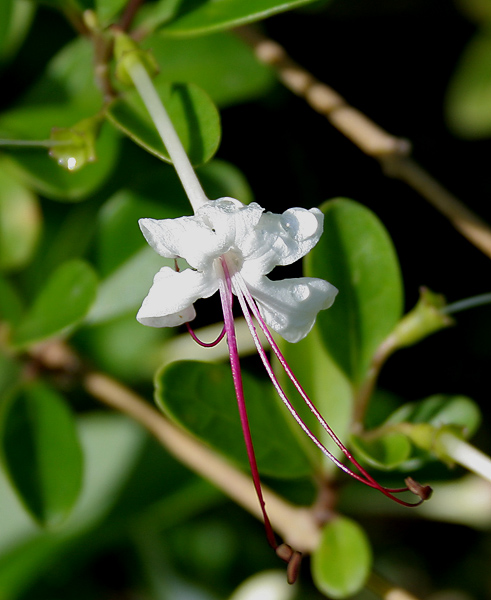
Volkameria inermis in Hyderabad, India.
