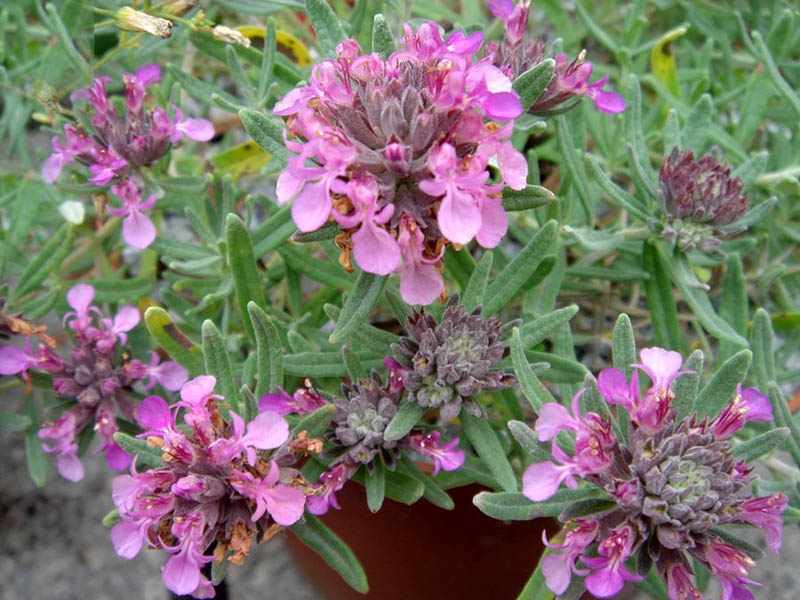

Scientific classification
- Kingdom: Plantae
- Clade: Tracheophytes
- Clade: Angiosperms
- Clade: Eudicots
- Clade: Asterids
- Order: Lamiales
- Family: Lamiaceae
- Genus: Teucrium
- Species: T. ackermannii

Binomial name
- Teucrium ackermannii hort.

= Teucrium ackermannii =

Silver germander

Species of plant

Teucrium ackermannii, the silver germander, is a flowering plant in the family Teucrioideae. It is of unknown origin and naming.

== Cultivation ==
This plant has gained the Royal Horticultural Society's Award of Garden Merit.
