= Oxera baladica =

Conservation status
- Least Concern (IUCN 3.1)

Scientific classification
- Kingdom: Plantae
- Clade: Tracheophytes
- Clade: Angiosperms
- Clade: Eudicots
- Clade: Asterids
- Order: Lamiales
- Family: Lamiaceae
- Genus: Oxera
- Species: O. baladica

Binomial name
- Oxera baladica Vieill.

Species of flowering plant

Oxera baladica is a species of flowering plant in the family Lamiaceae. It is a shrub or tree endemic to New Caledonia. It comprises two subspecies, both of which are included as vulnerable species on the IUCN Red List:

- Oxera baladica subsp. baladica (formerly Oxera cauliflora)
- Oxera baladica subsp. nuda (formerly Oxera nuda)
