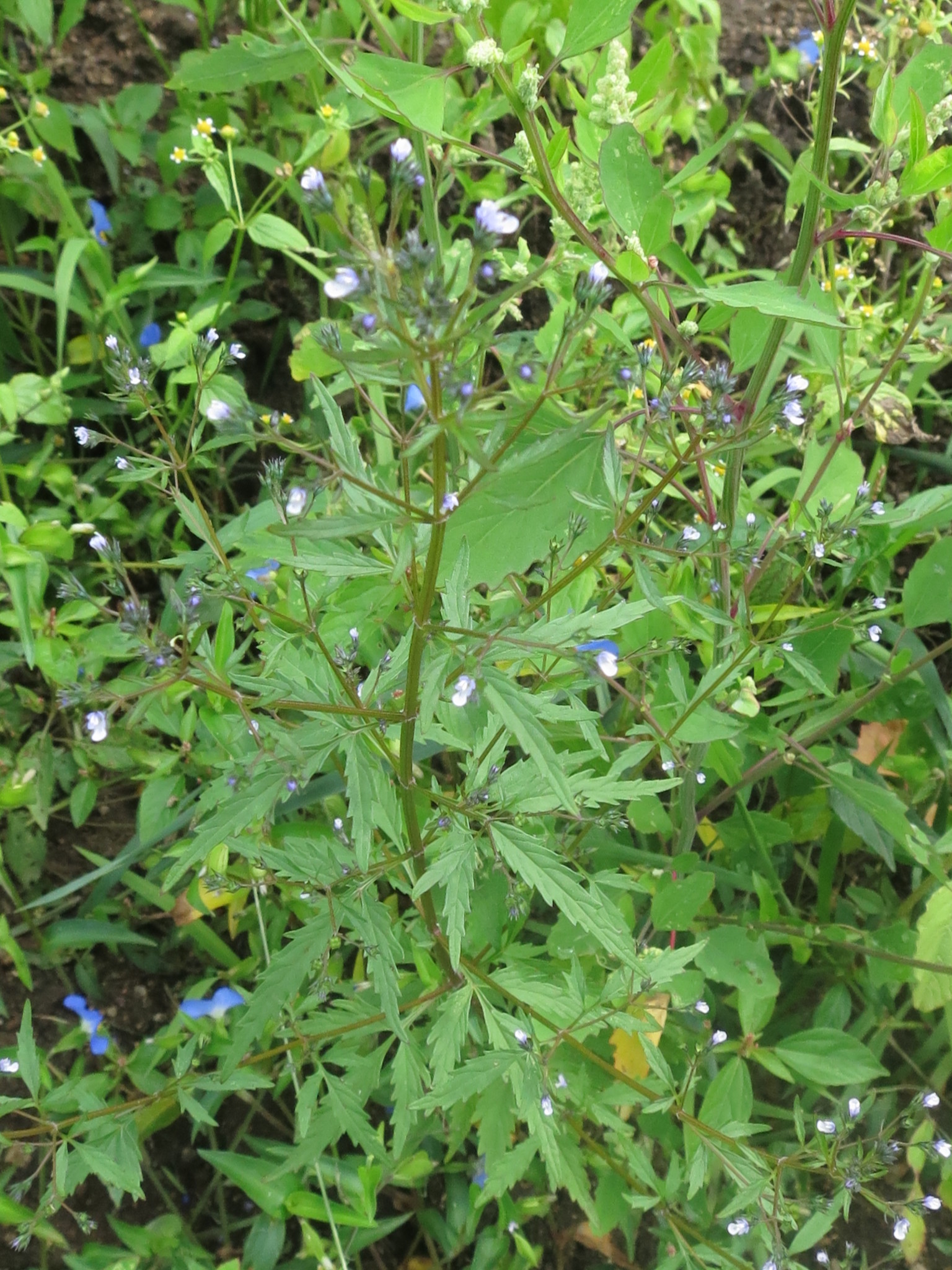

Scientific classification
- Kingdom: Plantae
- Clade: Tracheophytes
- Clade: Angiosperms
- Clade: Eudicots
- Clade: Asterids
- Order: Lamiales
- Family: Lamiaceae
- Subfamily: Ajugoideae
- Genus: Amethystea; L.
- Species: A. caerulea

Binomial name
- Amethystea caerulea L.

Synonyms
- Amethystea trifida Hill; Amethystea corymbosa Pers.; Lycopus amethystinus Steven; Amethystina Zinn

= Amethystea =

Species of plant

Amethystea is a genus of plants in the family Lamiaceae, first described for modern science by Linnaeus in 1753. It has only one known species, Amethystea caerulea, commonly known as blue amethystea. It is native to China, Japan, Korea, Central Asia (Tibet, Xinjiang, Kazakhstan, Tajikistan, Kyrgyzstan), and parts of Russia (Altai, Chita, Irkutsk, Buryatiya, Primorye).
