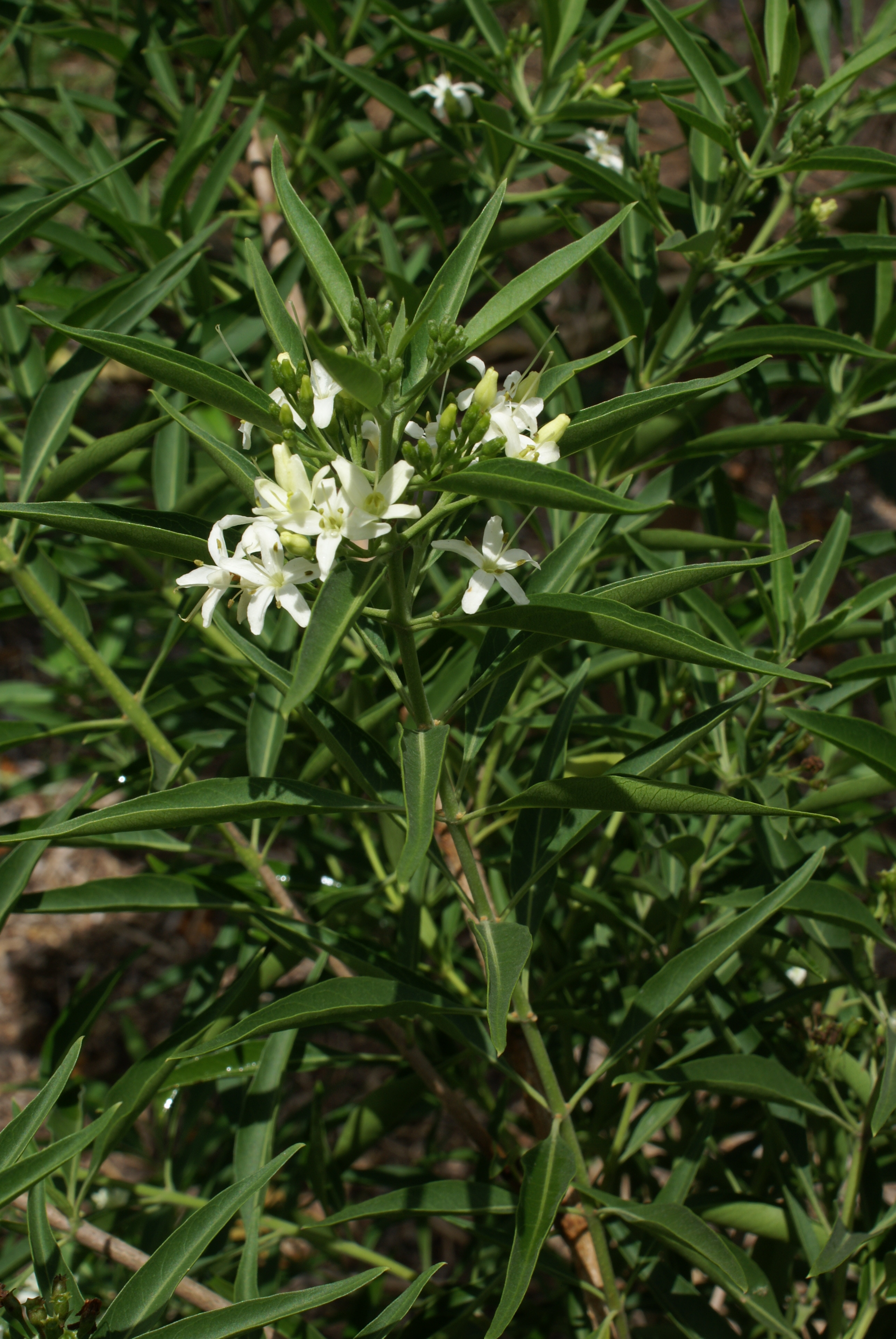

Scientific classification
- Kingdom: Plantae
- Clade: Tracheophytes
- Clade: Angiosperms
- Clade: Eudicots
- Clade: Asterids
- Order: Lamiales
- Family: Lamiaceae
- Genus: Volkameria
- Species: V. heterophylla

Binomial name
- Volkameria heterophylla Poir.

Synonyms
- Clerodendrum heterophyllum (Poir.) R.Br.; Clerodendrum heterophyllum f. angustifolium Moldenke; Clerodendrum heterophyllum var. baueri Moldenke; Clerodendrum heterophyllum f. baueri (Moldenke) Munir; Volkameria angustifolia Andrews [nom. illeg.]

= Volkameria heterophylla =

Species of flowering plant

Volkameria heterophylla (common names - bois de chenilles, verveine malgache) is a species of flowering plant in the genus Volkameria of the family Lamiaceae. It is a native to Mauritius and La Réunion.

In La Réunion it is found in the semi-dry forests in the West of the island, between Saint-Paul and Saint-Leu and it reaches a height of 4 meters.

It is naturalised in India, Australia (Western Australia and Queensland), Madagascar and the Mozambique Channel Islands.
