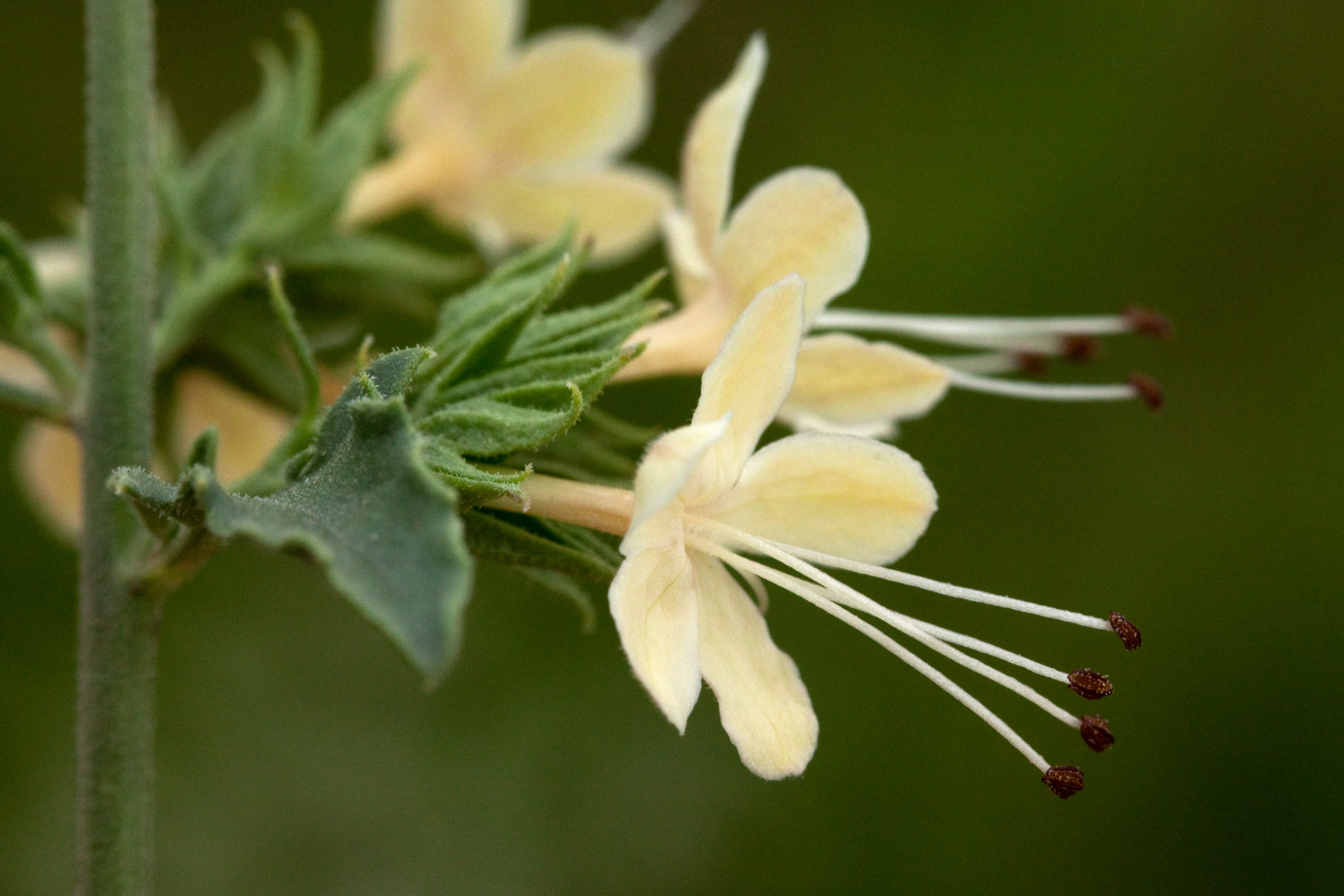

Scientific classification
- Kingdom: Plantae
- Clade: Tracheophytes
- Clade: Angiosperms
- Clade: Eudicots
- Clade: Asterids
- Order: Lamiales
- Family: Lamiaceae
- Genus: Tetraclea
- Species: T. coulteri

Binomial name
- Tetraclea coulteri A.Gray

= Tetraclea coulteri =

Species of flowering plant

Tetraclea coulteri, or Coulter's wrinklefruit, is a perennial plant in the mint family (Lamiaceae) that grows on sandy flats and coarse gravelly slopes of the Sonoran Desert, from southern Arizona to western Texas and northern Mexico. Its white flowers open at night and close with the warmth of day.
