= Schnabelia =

Scientific classification
- Kingdom: Plantae
- Clade: Tracheophytes
- Clade: Angiosperms
- Clade: Eudicots
- Clade: Asterids
- Order: Lamiales
- Family: Lamiaceae
- Subfamily: Ajugoideae
- Genus: Schnabelia; Hand.-Mazz.

Synonyms
- Chienodoxa Y.Z.Sun

Genus of flowering plants

Schnabelia is a genus of plants in the family Lamiaceae, first described in 1921. The entire genus is endemic to China.

Species

Below are species currently placed in the genus by the World Checklist. Names used by Flora of China are in parentheses.

- Schnabelia aureoglandulosa (Vaniot) P.D.Cantino (= Caryopteris aureoglandulosa (Vaniot) C. Y. Wu) - Guizhou, Hubei, Sichuan, Yunnan
- Schnabelia nepetifolia (Benth.) P.D.Cantino (= Caryopteris nepetifolia (Benth.) Maxim) - Anhui, Fujian, Jiangsu, Zhejiang
- Schnabelia oligophylla Hand.-Mazz. - Fujian, Guangdong, Guangxi, Hainan, Hunan, Jiangxi, Sichuan, Yunnan
- Schnabelia terniflora (Maxim.) P.D.Cantino (= Caryopteris terniflora Maxim) - Gansu, Guizhou, Hebei, Henan, Hubei, Jiangxi, Shaanxi, Shanxi, Sichuan, Yunnan
- Schnabelia tetradonta (Y.Z.Sun) C.Y.Wu & C.Chen - Guizhou, Sichuan
