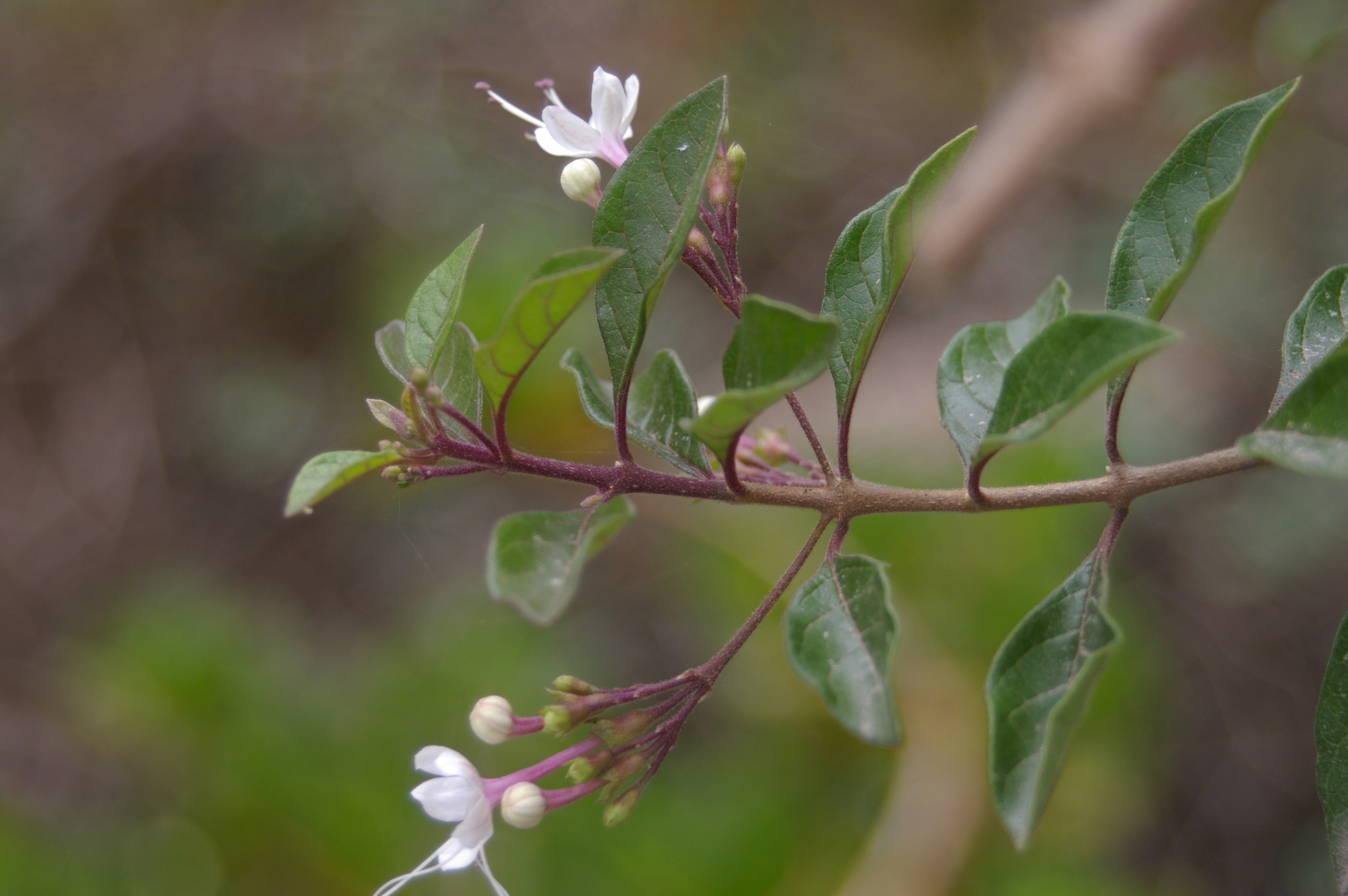

Scientific classification
- Kingdom: Plantae
- Clade: Tracheophytes
- Clade: Angiosperms
- Clade: Eudicots
- Clade: Asterids
- Order: Lamiales
- Family: Lamiaceae
- Genus: Volkameria
- Species: V. mollis

Binomial name
- Volkameria mollis (Kunth) Mabb. & Y.W.Yuan

= Volkameria mollis =

Species of plant

Volkameria mollis is a species of flowering plant in the family Lamiaceae that is native to the Galapagos Islands and to the mainland South American coast from Panama to Peru.
