= Discretitheca =

Scientific classification
- Kingdom: Plantae
- Clade: Tracheophytes
- Clade: Angiosperms
- Clade: Eudicots
- Clade: Asterids
- Order: Lamiales
- Family: Lamiaceae
- Subfamily: Ajugoideae
- Genus: Discretitheca; P.D.Cantino
- Species: D. nepalensis

Binomial name
- Discretitheca nepalensis (Moldenke) P.D.Cantino

Synonyms
- Caryopteris nepalensis Moldenke; Caryopteris nepalensis var. parvifolia Moldenke; Discretitheca nepalensis var. parvifolia (Moldenke) V.S.Kumar

Genus of flowering plants

Discretitheca is a genus of plants in the family Lamiaceae, first described in 1999. It contains only one known species, Discretitheca nepalensis, endemic to Nepal.
