= Oxera balansae =

Conservation status
- Endangered (IUCN 3.1)

Scientific classification
- Kingdom: Plantae
- Clade: Tracheophytes
- Clade: Angiosperms
- Clade: Eudicots
- Clade: Asterids
- Order: Lamiales
- Family: Lamiaceae
- Genus: Oxera
- Species: O. balansae

Binomial name
- Oxera balansae Dubard

Species of flowering plant

Oxera balansae is a New Caledonian flowering plant in the mint family (Lamiaceae). It was first formally named in 1906. Little is known about its population size; it is known from scattered locations on Grande Terre, Pine Island, and Lifou. It is listed as an Endangered species on the IUCN Red List due to its limited distribution and habitat loss and degradation by agriculture, rusa deer (Cervus timorensis russa), and uncontrolled fires.
