= Pseudocaryopteris =

Scientific classification
- Kingdom: Plantae
- Clade: Tracheophytes
- Clade: Angiosperms
- Clade: Eudicots
- Clade: Asterids
- Order: Lamiales
- Family: Lamiaceae
- Subfamily: Ajugoideae
- Genus: Pseudocaryopteris (Briq.) P.D.Cantino

Genus of flowering plants

Pseudocaryopteris is a genus of plants first described in 1999. It is native to China, Thailand, Myanmar, and the Himalayas (from Pakistan to Assam).

Species

Species below are those accepted by the World Checklist. Names used by Flora of China are in parentheses

- Pseudocaryopteris bicolor (Roxb. ex Hardw.) P.D.Cantino - (Caryopteris bicolor (Roxb. ex Hardw.) Mabb.) - China, Pakistan, northern + eastern India, Nepal, Bangladesh, Bhuran, Arunachal Pradesh, Thailand
- Pseudocaryopteris foetida (D.Don) P.D.Cantino - Pakistan, northern India, Nepal
- Pseudocaryopteris paniculata (C.B.Clarke) P.D.Cantino - (Caryopteris paniculata C.B.Clarke) - China, Pakistan, northern + eastern India, Nepal, Bangladesh, Bhuran, Arunachal Pradesh, Thailand, Myanmar
