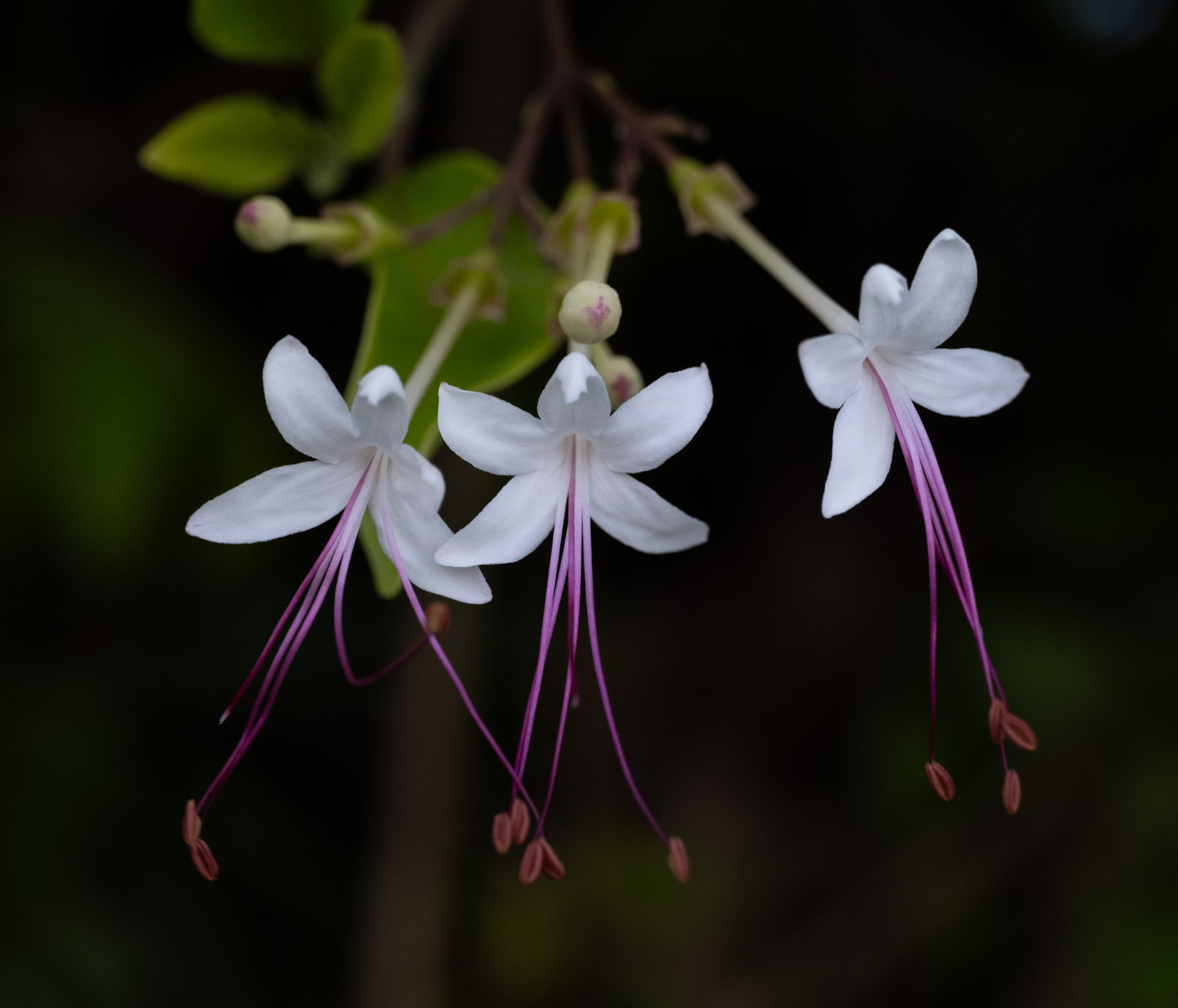

Scientific classification
- Kingdom: Plantae
- Clade: Tracheophytes
- Clade: Angiosperms
- Clade: Eudicots
- Clade: Asterids
- Order: Lamiales
- Family: Lamiaceae
- Genus: Volkameria
- Species: V. inermis

Binomial name
- Volkameria inermis L.

Synonyms
- 23 synonyms: Clerodendrum inerme (L.) Gaertn.; Ovieda inermis (L.) Burm.f.; Clerodendrum buxifolium (Willd.) Spreng.; Clerodendrum capsulare Blanco; Clerodendrum commersonii (Poir.) Spreng.; Clerodendrum coriaceum Poir.; Clerodendrum coromandelianum Spreng.; Clerodendrum emarginatum Briq.; Clerodendrum inerme var. macrocarpum (Wall. ex C.B.Clarke) Moldenke; Clerodendrum inerme var. neriifolium Kurz; Clerodendrum inerme var. oceanicum A.Gray; Clerodendrum inerme f. parvifolium Moldenke; Clerodendrum javanicum Spreng.; Clerodendrum neriifolium (Roxb.) Wall. ex Steud.; Clerodendrum neriifolium var. macrocarpum Wall. ex C.B.Clarke; Clerodendrum ovalifolium (A.Juss.) Bakh.; Clerodendrum ovatum Poir.; Ovieda ovalifolia A.Juss.; Vitex pinnata f. anomala Moldenke; Volkameria buxifolia Willd.; Volkameria commersonii Poir.; Volkameria neriifolia Roxb.; Catesbaea javanica Osbeck

= Volkameria inermis =

Species of flowering plant

Volkameria inermis, commonly known as Indian privet, seaside Clerodendrum and scrambling Clerodendrum, among other names, is a species of flowering plant in the mint and sage family Lamiaceae, found in mangrove shores and coastal forests of Australia, Asia, Malesia and the Pacific islands. It is a vine or shrub, and was first described in 1788. In Australia it is treated as Clerodendrum inermis. It is also naturalised in Tunisia, north of Africa.

== Botany ==
This is a shrub 1 to 4 metres tall, but it can grow into a tree with a height up to 10 m. It has woody, smooth stems. Its leaves are arranged alternately; each blade is elliptical, with a length of 1.5 to 4 centimetres with a smooth surface and dark green on its underside.

The flower is trumpet-shaped with white petals 1.5 to 4 cm long and long reddish or purple stamens. It grows in clusters, each made of 3 to 7 petals joined at the base. Its fruit is round or egg-shaped with a length of 1 cm, it turns from green to black when ripe. When the fruit is dried up, it breaks into 4 lobes with thick corky walls. The tree flowers and bears fruit around the same time from July to December, the fruit ripen in March.

== Uses ==
Its parts has many medical properties. The seeds and roots are used to treat venom from bitten by some fish and other marine animals.

== Gallery ==
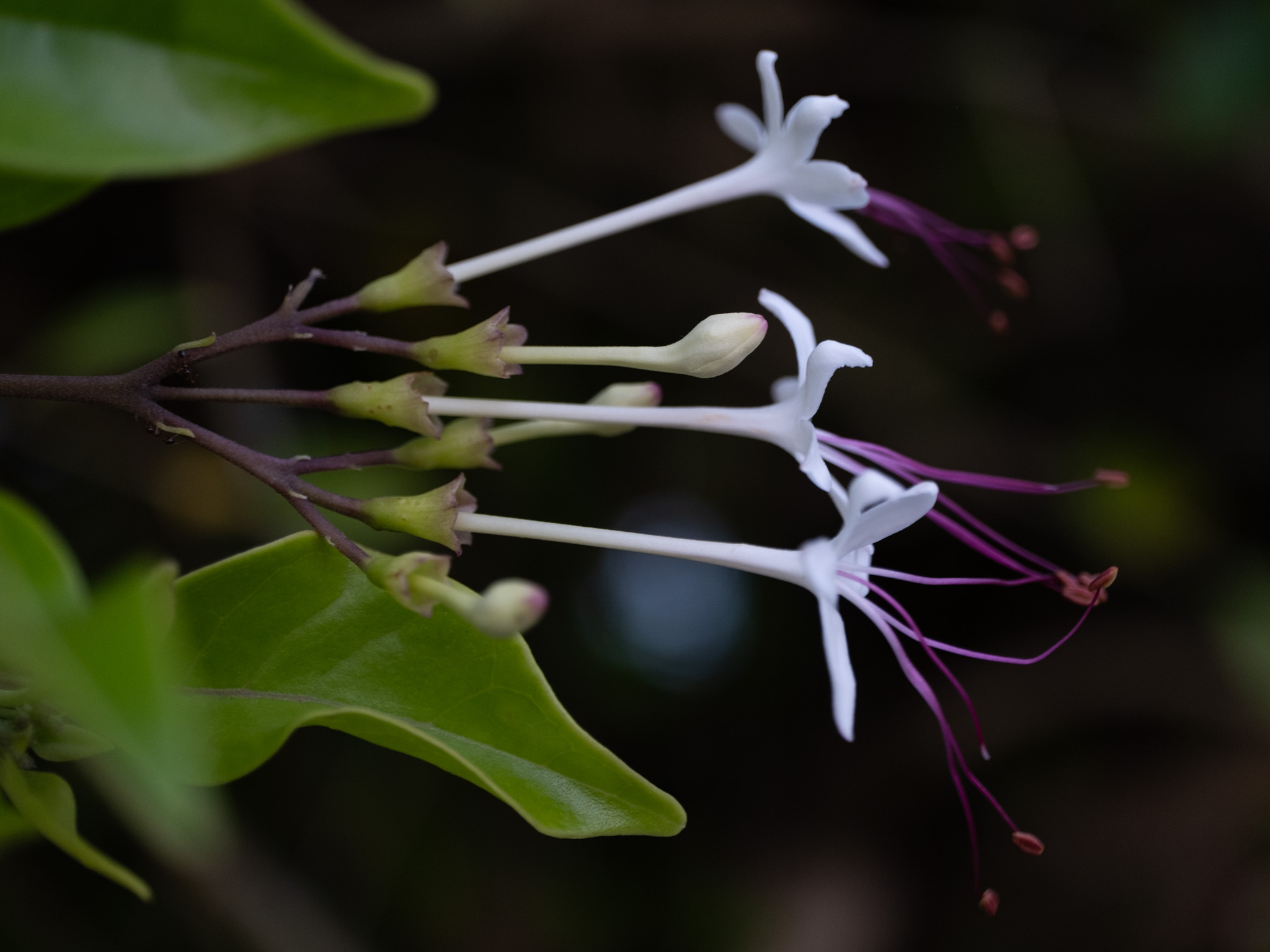
Inflorescence

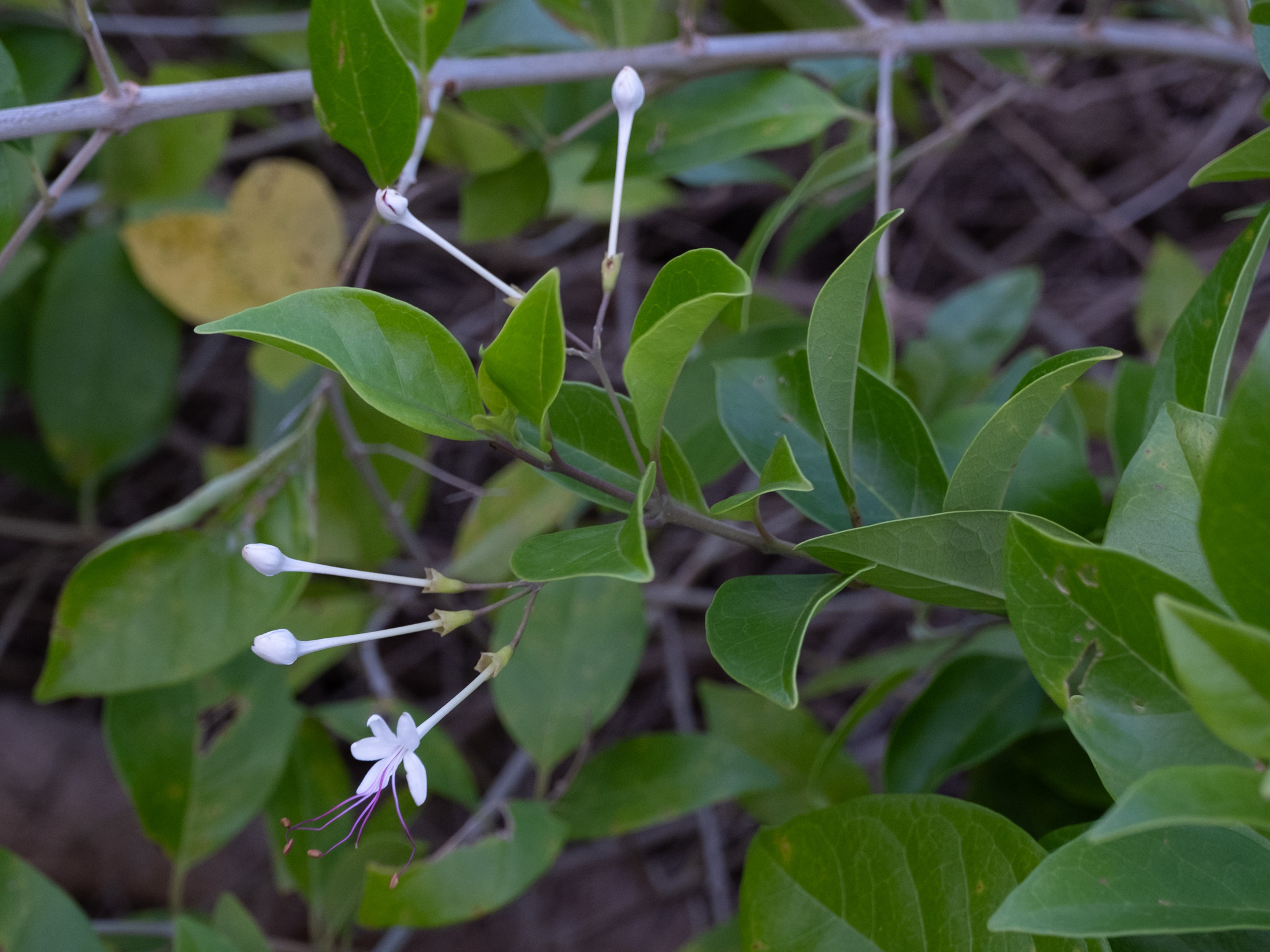
Leaves and flowers

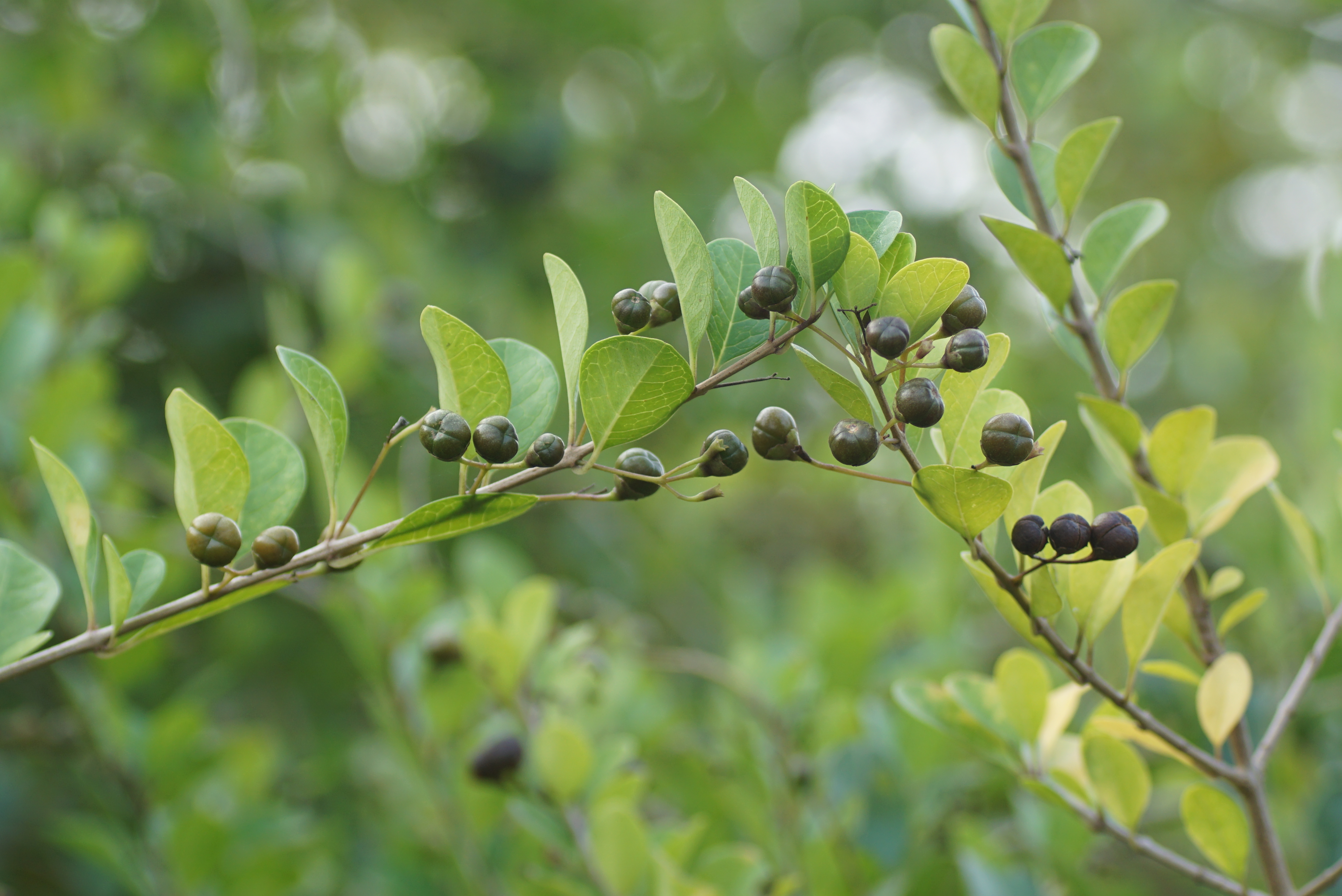
Fruits

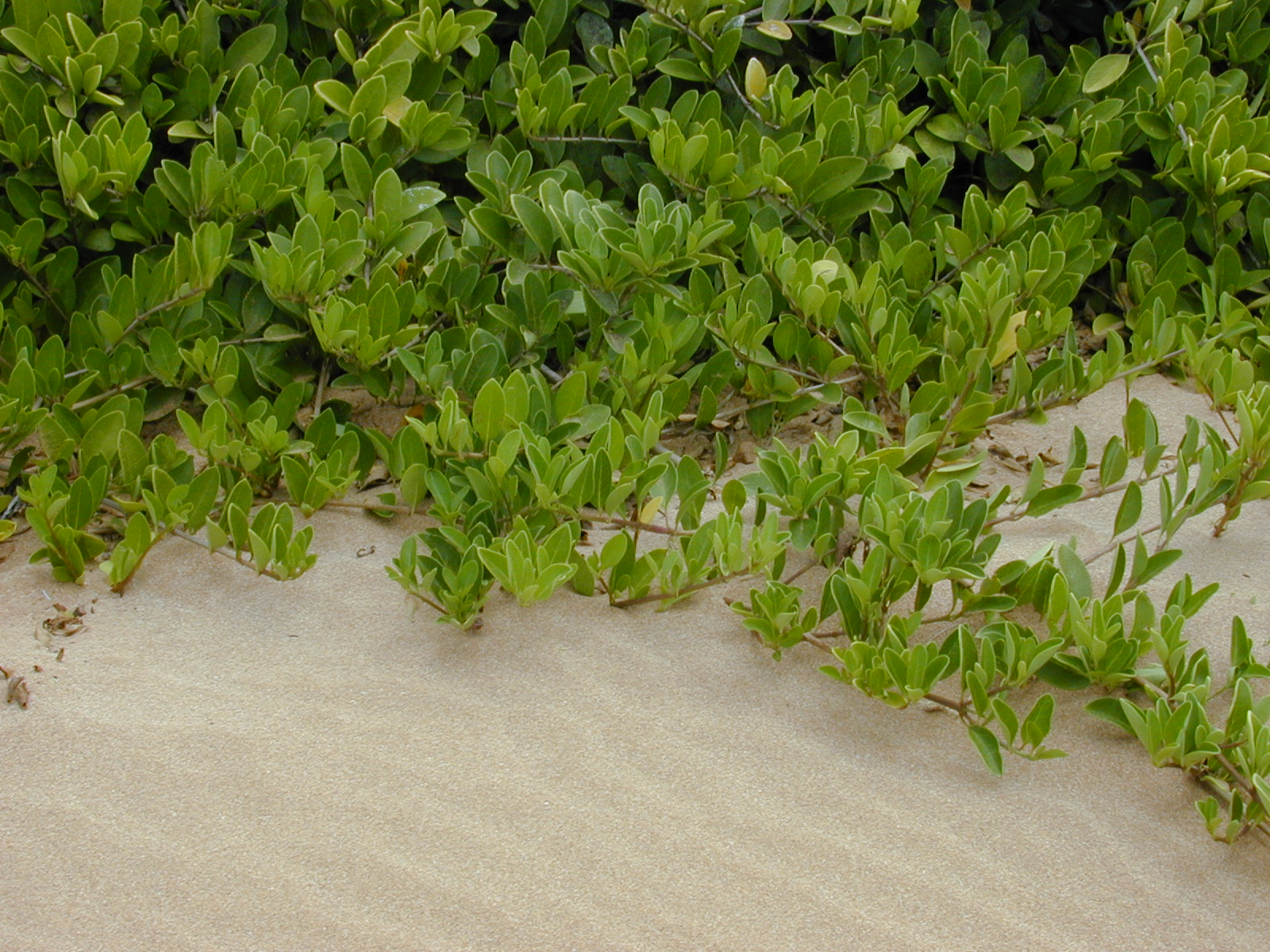
In sand dunes

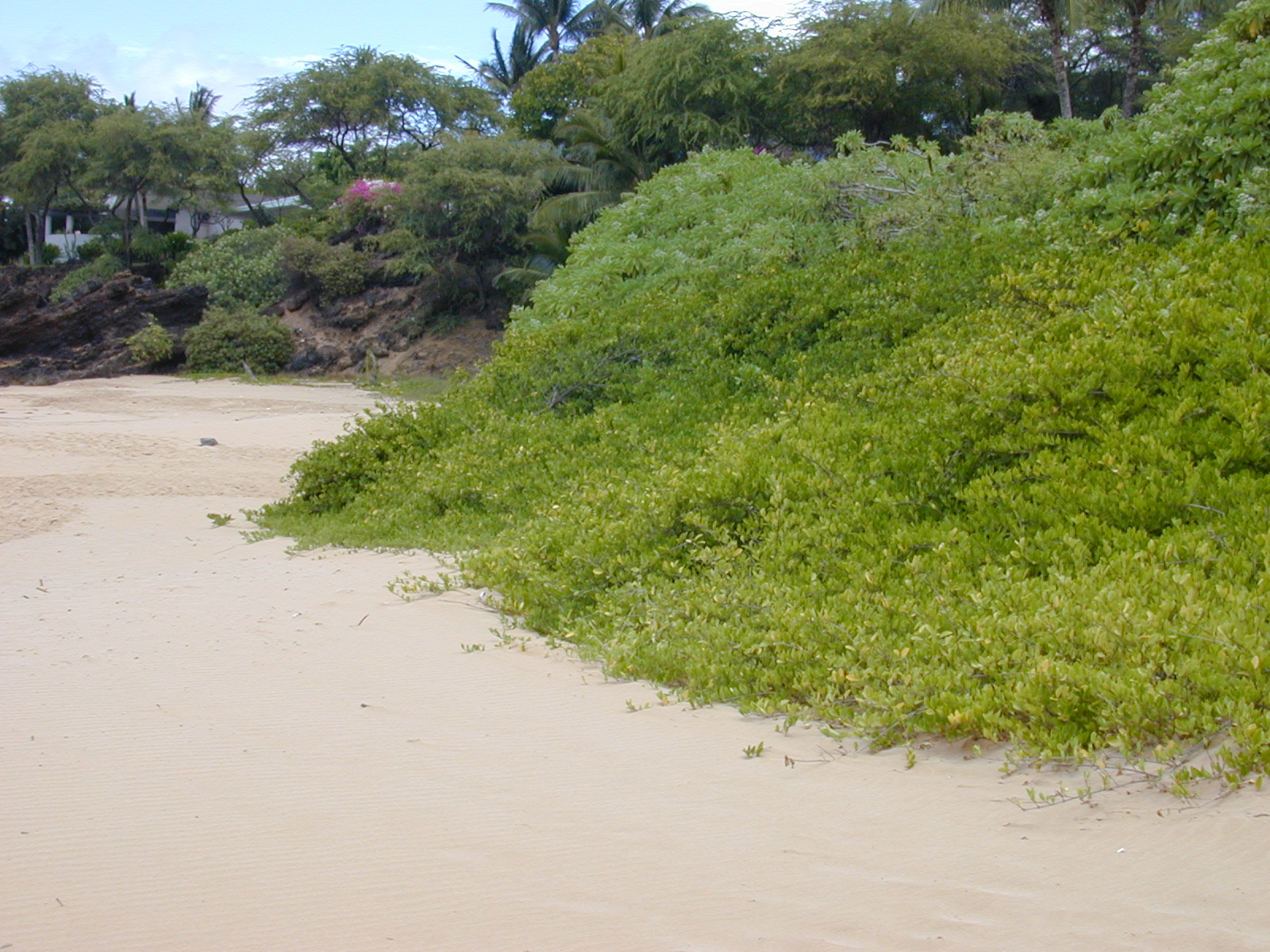
Habit
