= Rubiteucris =

Scientific classification
- Kingdom: Plantae
- Clade: Tracheophytes
- Clade: Angiosperms
- Clade: Eudicots
- Clade: Asterids
- Order: Lamiales
- Family: Lamiaceae
- Subfamily: Ajugoideae
- Genus: Rubiteucris; Kudô

Synonyms
- Cardioteucris C.Y.Wu

Genus of flowering plants

Rubiteucris is a genus of plants in the family Lamiaceae, first described in 1929. It is native to southern China, the Himalayas, and Myanmar.

Species

- Rubiteucris palmata (Benth. ex Hook.f.) Kudô – Assam, Bhutan, Nepal, Sikkim, Gansu, Guizhou, Hubei, Shaanxi, Sichuan, Taiwan, Tibet, Yunnan
- Rubiteucris siccanea (W.W.Sm.) P.D.Cantino – Sichuan, Yunnan, Myanmar
