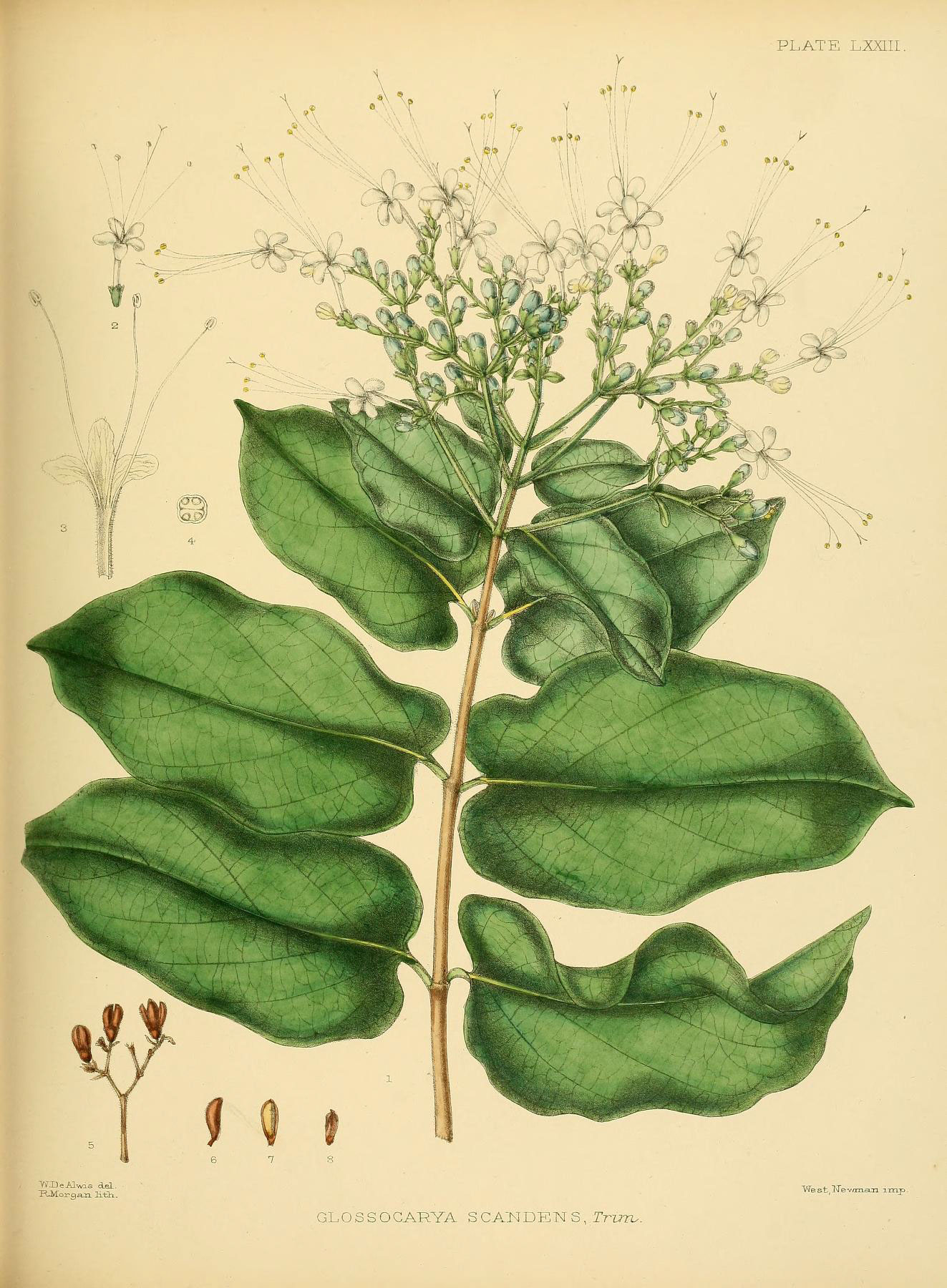
- Glossocarya scandens

Scientific classification
- Kingdom: Plantae
- Clade: Tracheophytes
- Clade: Angiosperms
- Clade: Eudicots
- Clade: Asterids
- Order: Lamiales
- Family: Lamiaceae
- Subfamily: Ajugoideae
- Genus: Glossocarya; Wall. ex Griff.

= Glossocarya =

Genus of flowering plants

Glossocarya is a genus of flowering plants in the mint family, Lamiaceae, first described in 1843. It is native to Indochina, Sri Lanka, New Guinea, and Queensland.

Species

- Glossocarya calcicola Domin - Queensland
- Glossocarya coriacea Munir - Queensland
- Glossocarya crenata H.R.Fletcher - Thailand
- Glossocarya hemiderma (F.Muell. ex Benth.) Benth. ex B.D.Jacks. - Queensland, New Guinea
- Glossocarya longiflora H.R.Fletcher - Thailand
- Glossocarya mollis Wall. ex Griff - Myanmar, Thailand, Vietnam, Paluan Rabana in Malaysia
- Glossocarya premnoides Ridl. - Thailand, Perlis in Malaysia
- Glossocarya puberula Moldenke - Cambodia
- Glossocarya scandens (L.f.) Trimen - Sri Lanka
- Glossocarya siamensis Craib - Thailand, Vietnam
