= Oxera macrocalyx =

Conservation status
- Vulnerable (IUCN 2.3)

Scientific classification
- Kingdom: Plantae
- Clade: Tracheophytes
- Clade: Angiosperms
- Clade: Eudicots
- Clade: Asterids
- Order: Lamiales
- Family: Lamiaceae
- Genus: Oxera
- Species: O. macrocalyx

Binomial name
- Oxera macrocalyx Dubard

Species of flowering plant

Oxera macrocalyx is a species of plant in the family Lamiaceae. It is endemic to New Caledonia.
