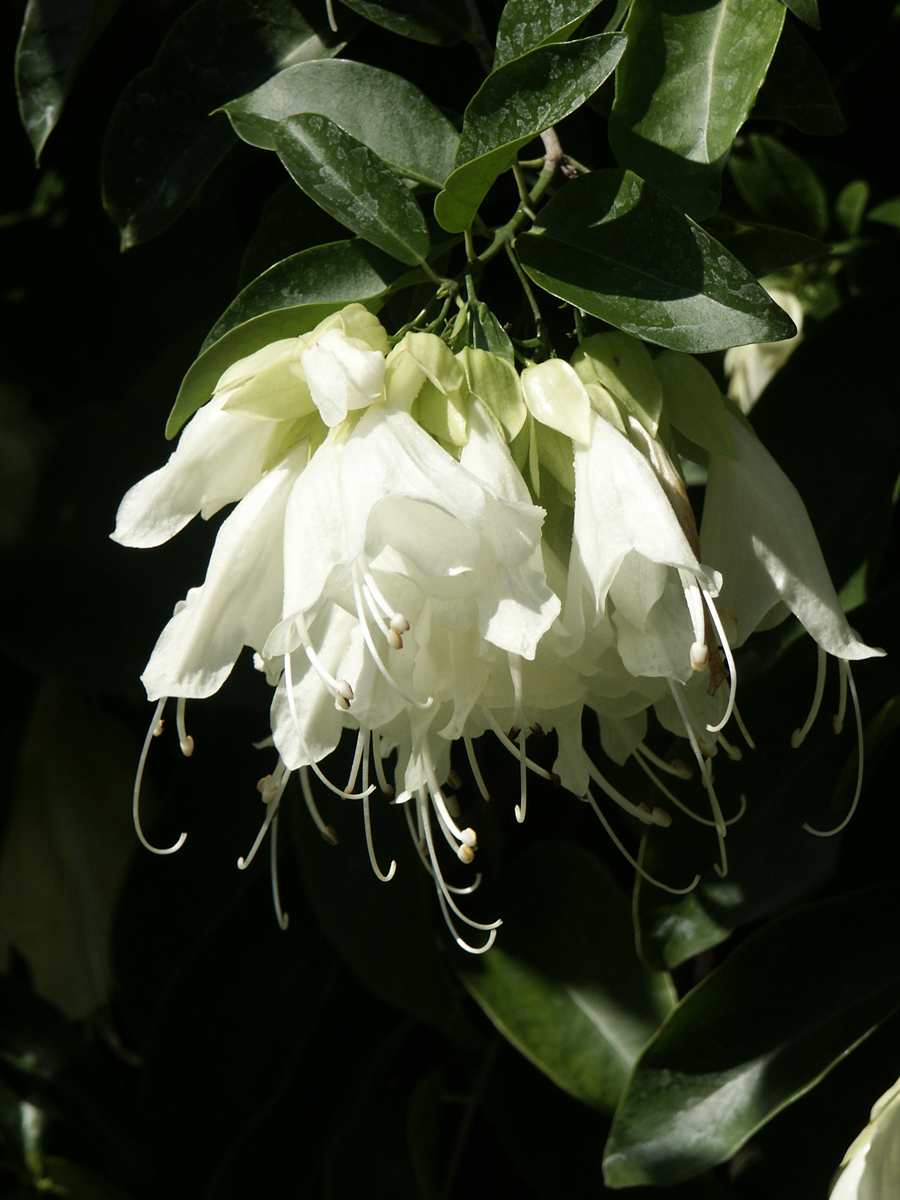

Conservation status
- Near Threatened (IUCN 3.1)

Scientific classification
- Kingdom: Plantae
- Clade: Tracheophytes
- Clade: Angiosperms
- Clade: Eudicots
- Clade: Asterids
- Order: Lamiales
- Family: Lamiaceae
- Genus: Oxera
- Species: O. crassifolia

Binomial name
- Oxera crassifolia Virot

= Oxera crassifolia =

Species of flowering plant

Oxera crassifolia is a species of plant in the family Lamiaceae. It is endemic to New Caledonia.
