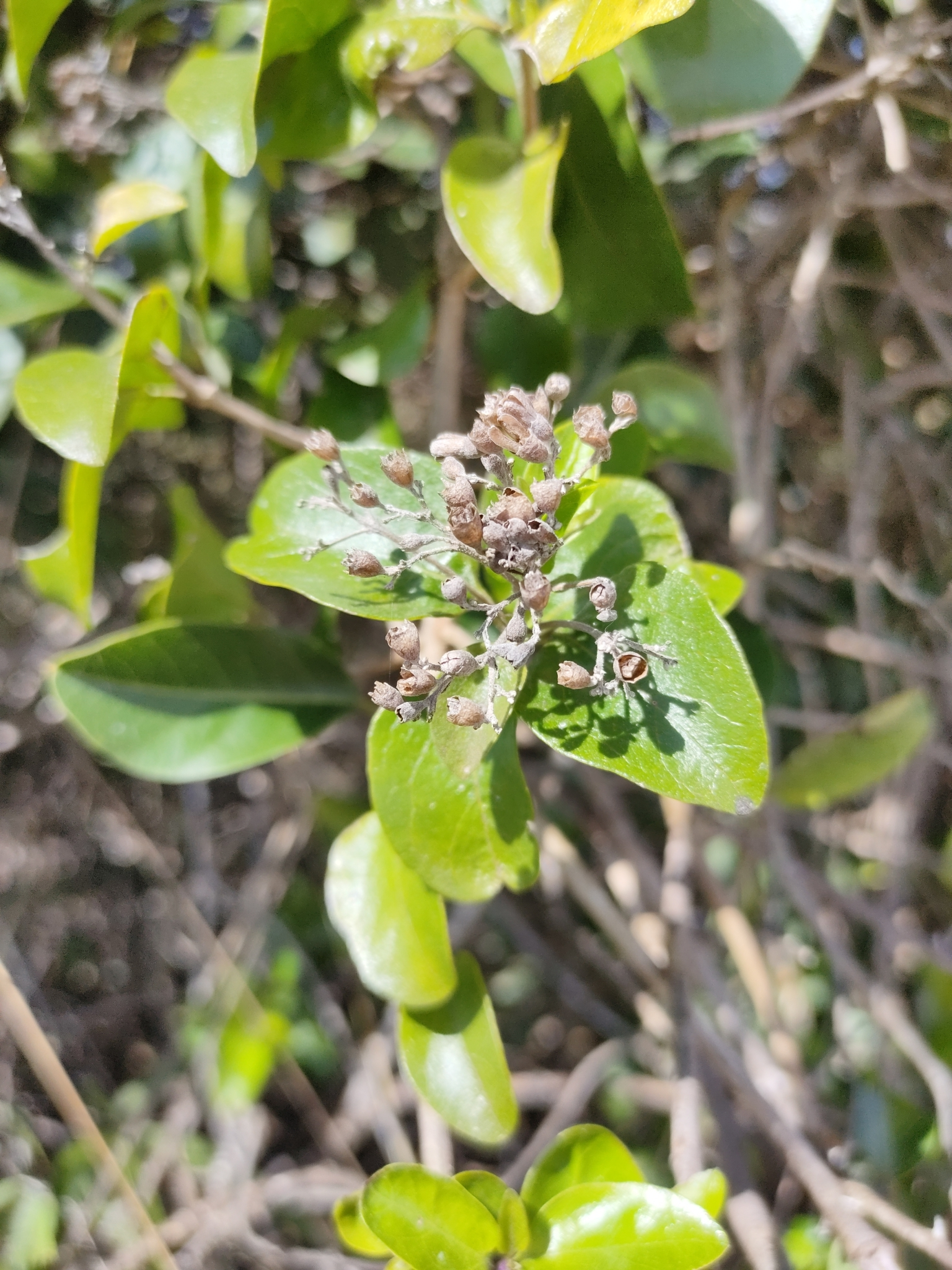
- Mature form, with fruit

Scientific classification
- Kingdom: Plantae
- Clade: Tracheophytes
- Clade: Angiosperms
- Clade: Eudicots
- Clade: Asterids
- Order: Lamiales
- Family: Lamiaceae
- Genus: Glossocarya
- Species: G. hemiderma

Binomial name
- Glossocarya hemiderma (F.Muell. ex Benth.) Benth. & Hook.f. ex B.D.Jacks.

Synonyms
- Clerodendrum hemiderma F.Muell. ex Benth.; Clerodendrum linnaei F.Muell. nom. ill.

= Glossocarya hemiderma =

Species of flowering plant

Glossocarya hemiderma is a species of plants in the mint and sage family Lamiaceae. It is native to Papua New Guinea and eastern parts of Queensland, Australia. It is a scrambling shrub or vine with a stem diameter up to 9 cm (3.5 in), and it inhabits rainforest and monsoon forest.

== Conservation ==
This species is listed as least concern under the Queensland Government's Nature Conservation Act. As of 29 April 2025, it has not been assessed by the International Union for Conservation of Nature (IUCN).
