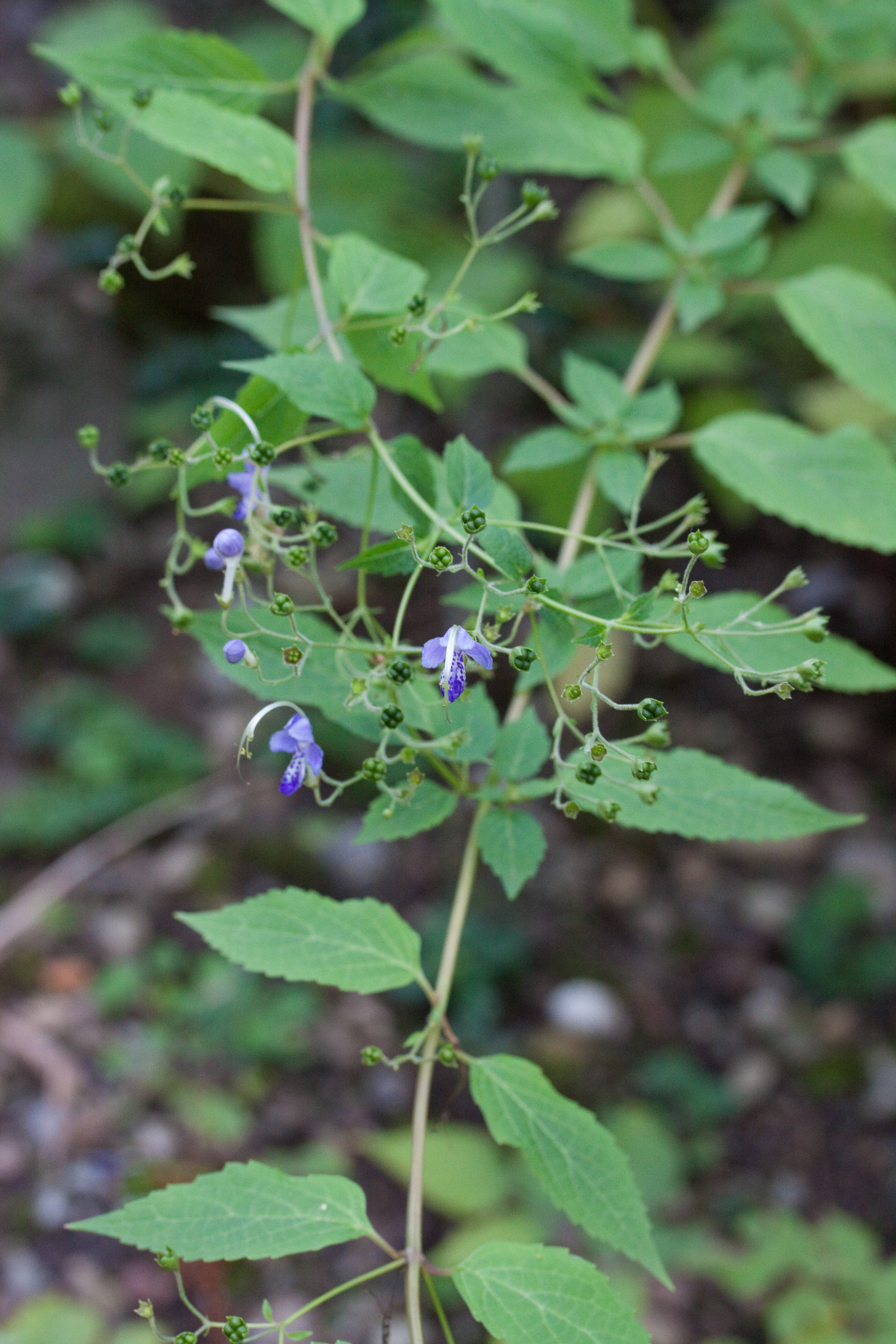

Scientific classification
- Kingdom: Plantae
- Clade: Embryophytes
- Clade: Tracheophytes
- Clade: Spermatophytes
- Clade: Angiosperms
- Clade: Eudicots
- Clade: Asterids
- Order: Lamiales
- Family: Lamiaceae
- Subfamily: Ajugoideae
- Genus: Tripora; P.D.Cantino
- Species: T. divaricata

Binomial name
- Tripora divaricata (Maxim.) P.D.Cantino

Synonyms
- Homotypic Synonyms: Caryopteris chosenensis Moldenke; Caryopteris divaricata Maxim.; Clerodendrum divaricatum Siebold & Zucc.; Clerodendrum sieboldii Kuntze; Heterotypic Synonyms: Microtoena coreana H.Lév.

= Tripora =

Genus of flowering plants

Tripora is genus of plants in the family Lamiaceae, first described as a genus in 1999. It includes only one known species, Tripora divaricata, native to Japan, Korea, and China (Gansu, Henan, Hubei, Jiangxi, Shaanxi, Shanxi, Sichuan).

It is still referred to by its synonym Caryopteris divaricata in the literature.
