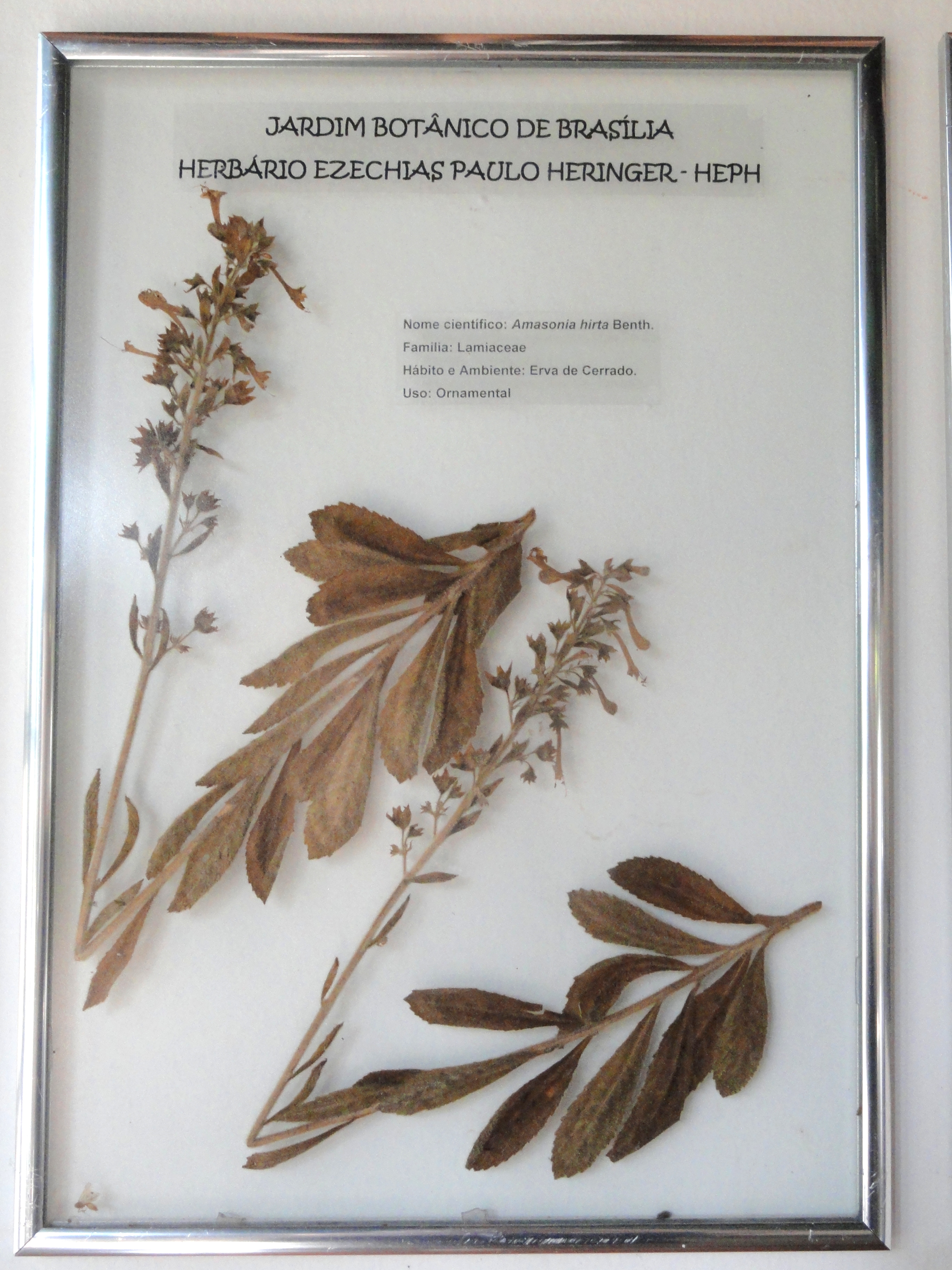

Scientific classification
- Kingdom: Plantae
- Clade: Tracheophytes
- Clade: Angiosperms
- Clade: Eudicots
- Clade: Asterids
- Order: Lamiales
- Family: Lamiaceae
- Genus: Amasonia
- Species: A. hirta

Binomial name
- Amasonia hirta Benth.

Synonyms
- Amasonia hirta var. paraensis Moldenke; Taligalea hirta (Benth.) Kuntze

= Amasonia hirta =

Species of flowering plant

Amasonia hirta is a species of plants in the family Lamiaceae.

The species is native to Brazil and Paraguay.

In Portuguese it goes by the common name mendoca and sangue de Cristo.
