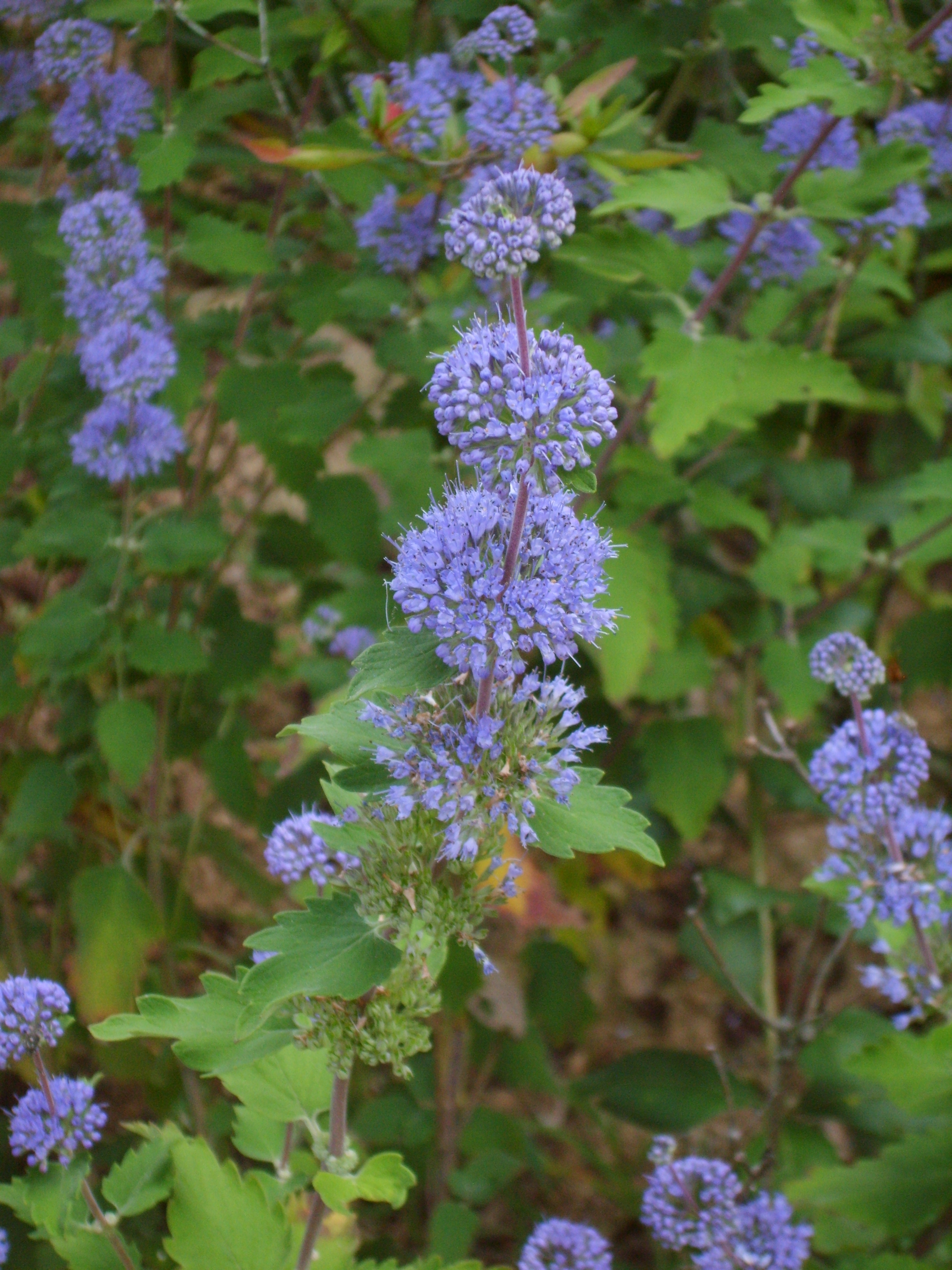
- Caryopteris incana

Scientific classification
- Kingdom: Plantae
- Clade: Embryophytes
- Clade: Tracheophytes
- Clade: Spermatophytes
- Clade: Angiosperms
- Clade: Eudicots
- Clade: Asterids
- Order: Lamiales
- Family: Lamiaceae
- Subfamily: Ajugoideae
- Genus: Caryopteris; Bunge

Synonyms
- Barbula Lour.; Mastacanthus Endl.

= Caryopteris =

Genus of flowering plants

Caryopteris (bluebeard; Chinese: 莸属 you shu) is a genus of flowering plants in the family Lamiaceae (formerly often placed in the family Verbenaceae). They are native to east Asia (China, Korea, Japan, Mongolia).

They are herbaceous plants or small shrubs growing to 1–4 m tall. The leaves are opposite, simple ovate to lanceolate, with an entire or crenate margin; they are often aromatic. The blue or white flowers are pollinated by butterflies and bumblebees. The fruit is a four-valved capsule containing four seeds.

Species

- Caryopteris forrestii Diels – Guizhou, Sichuan, Tibet, Yunnan
- Caryopteris glutinosa Rehd. – Sichuan
- Caryopteris incana (Thunb. ex Houtt.) Miq. – Taiwan, Korea, Japan, Anhui, Fujian, Guangdong, Guangxi, Hubei, Hunan, Jiangsu, Jiangxi, Zhejiang
- Caryopteris jinshajiangensis Y.K.Yang & X.D.Cong – Yunnan
- Caryopteris mongholica Bunge – Mongolia, Gansu, Hebei, Nei Mongol, Shaanxi, Shanxi
- Caryopteris tangutica Maxim. – Gansu, Hebei, Henan, Hubei, Shaanxi, Sichuan
- Caryopteris trichosphaera W.W.Smith – Tibet, Sichuan, Yunnan

formerly included

- Caryopteris aureoglandulosa (Vaniot) C. Y. Wu = Schnabelia aureoglandulosa (Vaniot) P.D.Cantino
- Caryopteris bicolor (Roxb. ex Hardw.) Mabb. = Pseudocaryopteris bicolor (Roxb. ex Hardw.) P.D.Cantino
- Caryopteris divaricata Maxim = Tripora divaricata (Maxim.) P.D.Cantino
- Caryopteris nepetifolia (Benth.) Maxim = Schnabelia nepetifolia (Benth.) P.D.Cantino
- Caryopteris paniculata C.B.Clarke = Pseudocaryopteris paniculata (C.B.Clarke) P.D.Cantino
- Caryopteris siccanea W.W.Sm. = Rubiteucris siccanea (W.W.Sm.) P.D.Cantino
- Caryopteris terniflora Maxim. = Schnabelia terniflora (Maxim.) P.D.Cantino

== Cultivation and uses ==
Though several Caryopteris species are grown in botanical gardens, as ornamental plants the species have largely been superseded in gardens by the hybrid Caryopteris × clandonensis (C. incana × C. mongholica). The accidental cross that produced it occurred in the garden of Arthur Simmonds at Clandon, near Guildford, Surrey. In 1930, wishing to propagate C. mongholica, he gathered seeds from a plant that was growing near C. mastacanthus. When the seedlings eventually flowered in their second year, hybrids appeared. The final selection, however, was made of a self-sown volunteer that appeared under C. mastacanthus, and eventually smothered it. It began winning Royal Horticultural Society medals in 1933. This small, deciduous, aromatic shrub has grey-green leaves and produces masses of blue flowers in late summer.

Caryopteris × clandonensis, an unusual plant in American gardens in the 1960s, has become more familiar there, especially in xeriscaping.

Like Buddleja, the woody stems can die back in the winter, particularly in colder climates and on heavy soils. They prefer well-draining, sandy soil in full sun, but does not need especially rich soil or constant moisture.

Leaves and herbaceous stems have a terpene aroma like eucalyptus, especially when lightly bruised.

=== Cultivars ===
There are several cultivars with flowers in shades of blue or white, including 'Blue Mist', 'Heavenly Blue', 'Longwood Blue', 'Dark Knight', 'Summer Sorbet' and 'Pershore'.

The following cultivars have gained the Royal Horticultural Society's Award of Garden Merit:

- 'Arthur Simmonds'
- 'First Choice'
- 'Hint of Gold' = 'Lisaura'
- 'Sterling Silver' = 'Lissilv'
- 'Summer Sorbet'
- 'Worcester Gold'
