= Monochilus =

Scientific classification
- Kingdom: Plantae
- Clade: Tracheophytes
- Clade: Angiosperms
- Clade: Eudicots
- Clade: Asterids
- Order: Lamiales
- Family: Lamiaceae
- Subfamily: Ajugoideae
- Genus: Monochilus; Fisch. & C.A.Mey.

Genus of flowering plants

Monochilus is a genus of plants in the mint family, Lamiaceae, first described in 1835. It contains two known species, both endemic to Brazil.

Species

1. Monochilus gloxinifolius Fisch. & C.A.Mey. - Rio de Janeiro
2. Monochilus obovatus P.D.Cantino - Goiás
