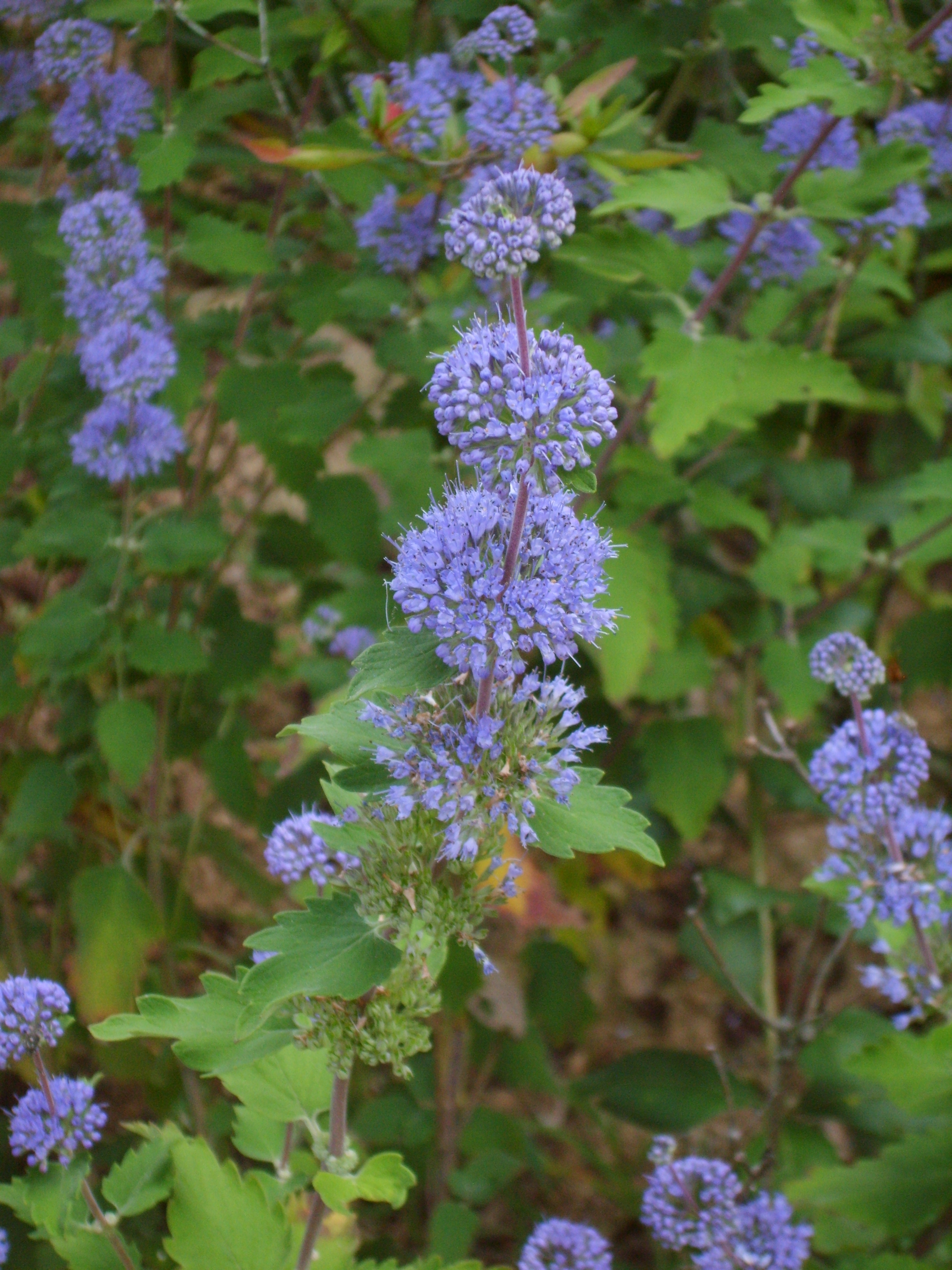

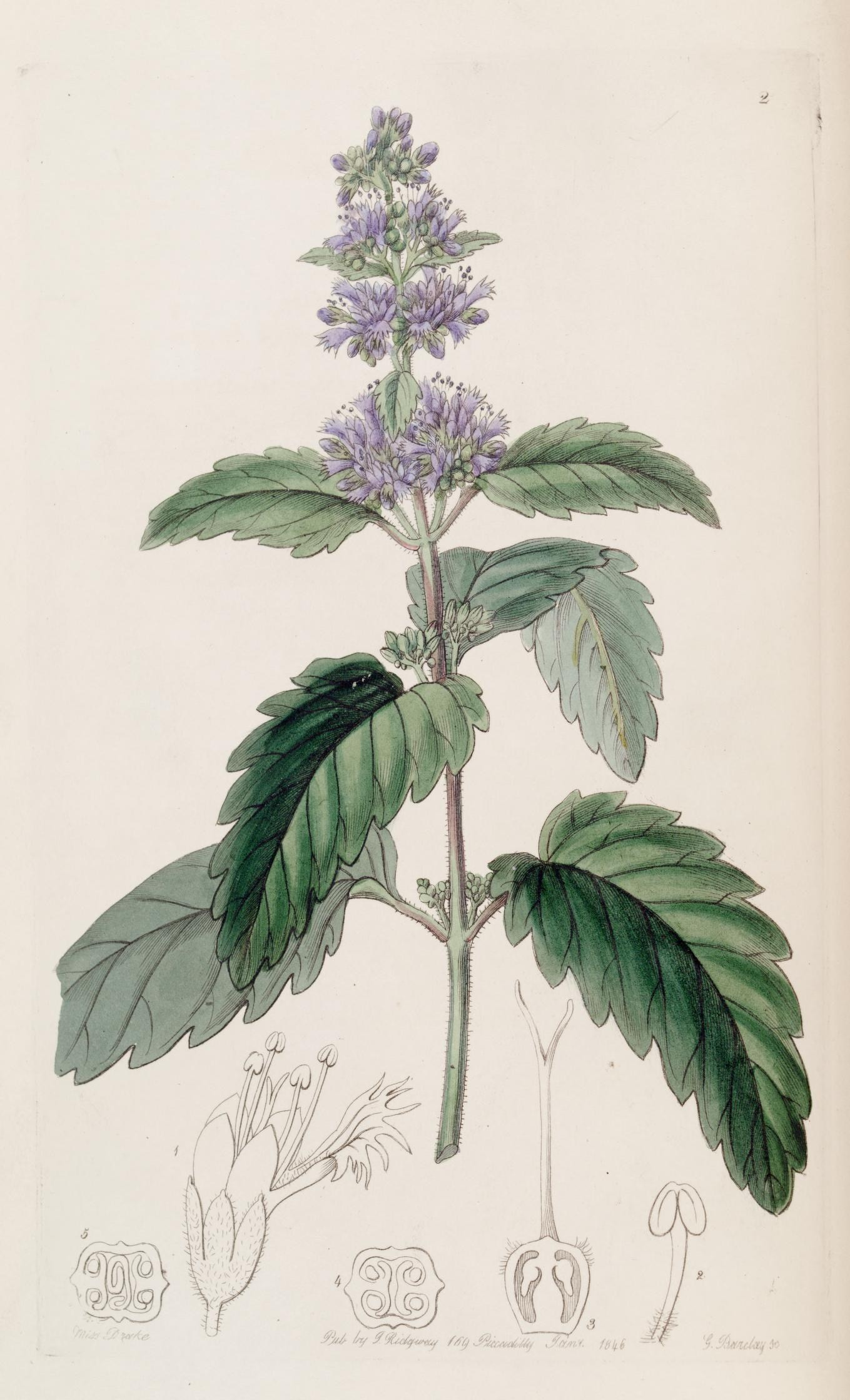
- Botanical illustration

Scientific classification
- Kingdom: Plantae
- Clade: Embryophytes
- Clade: Tracheophytes
- Clade: Spermatophytes
- Clade: Angiosperms
- Clade: Eudicots
- Clade: Asterids
- Order: Lamiales
- Family: Lamiaceae
- Genus: Caryopteris
- Species: C. incana

Binomial name
- Caryopteris incana (Houtt.) Miq.

Synonyms
- List: Barbula sinensis Lour.; Caryopteris incana f. albiflora S.H.Jin & D.Y.Ou; Caryopteris incana f. albiflora S.S.Ying; Caryopteris incana f. candida (C.K.Schneid.) H.Hara; Caryopteris incana var. candida C.K.Schneid.; Caryopteris incana f. macrophylla Moldenke; Caryopteris incana var. nana (Borsch) L.H.Bailey; Caryopteris incana f. nana (Borsch) Moldenke; Caryopteris incana var. superba (Dreer) L.H.Bailey; Caryopteris incana f. superba (Dreer) Moldenke; Caryopteris incana var. szechuanensis Moldenke; Caryopteris mastacanthus Schauer; Caryopteris mastacanthus var. nana Borsch; Caryopteris mastacanthus var. superba Dreer; Caryopteris ovata Miq.; Caryopteris sinensis (Lour.) Dippel; Mastacanthus barbula Steud.; Mastacanthus sinensis (Lour.) Endl. ex Walp.; Nepeta incana Houtt.; Nepeta japonica Willd.

= Caryopteris incana =

Species of plant

Caryopteris incana, the common bluebeard, is a species of flowering plant in the family Lamiaceae. It is native to central and southeastern China, Taiwan, Korea, and western Kyushu, Japan. An aromatic perennial subshrub reaching 50 cm (20 in), it is typically found at elevations from 100 to 800 m (300 to 2,600 ft). There are a number of cultivars, with 'Jason', which reaches 80 cm (30 in), being readily available from commercial suppliers. With Caryopteris mongholica it is a parent of the hybrid garden plant Caryopteris × clandonensis, the blue-mist shrub.

== Subtaxa ==
The following varieties are accepted:

- Caryopteris incana var. angustifolia S.L.Chen & R.L.Guo – subtropical areas, on stony substrates, in thickets, Jiangxi, China
- Caryopteris incana var. incana – temperate areas, on slopes and alongside roads, central and southeastern China, Taiwan, Korea, and western Kyushu, Japan, and introduced to Illinois and Bulgaria
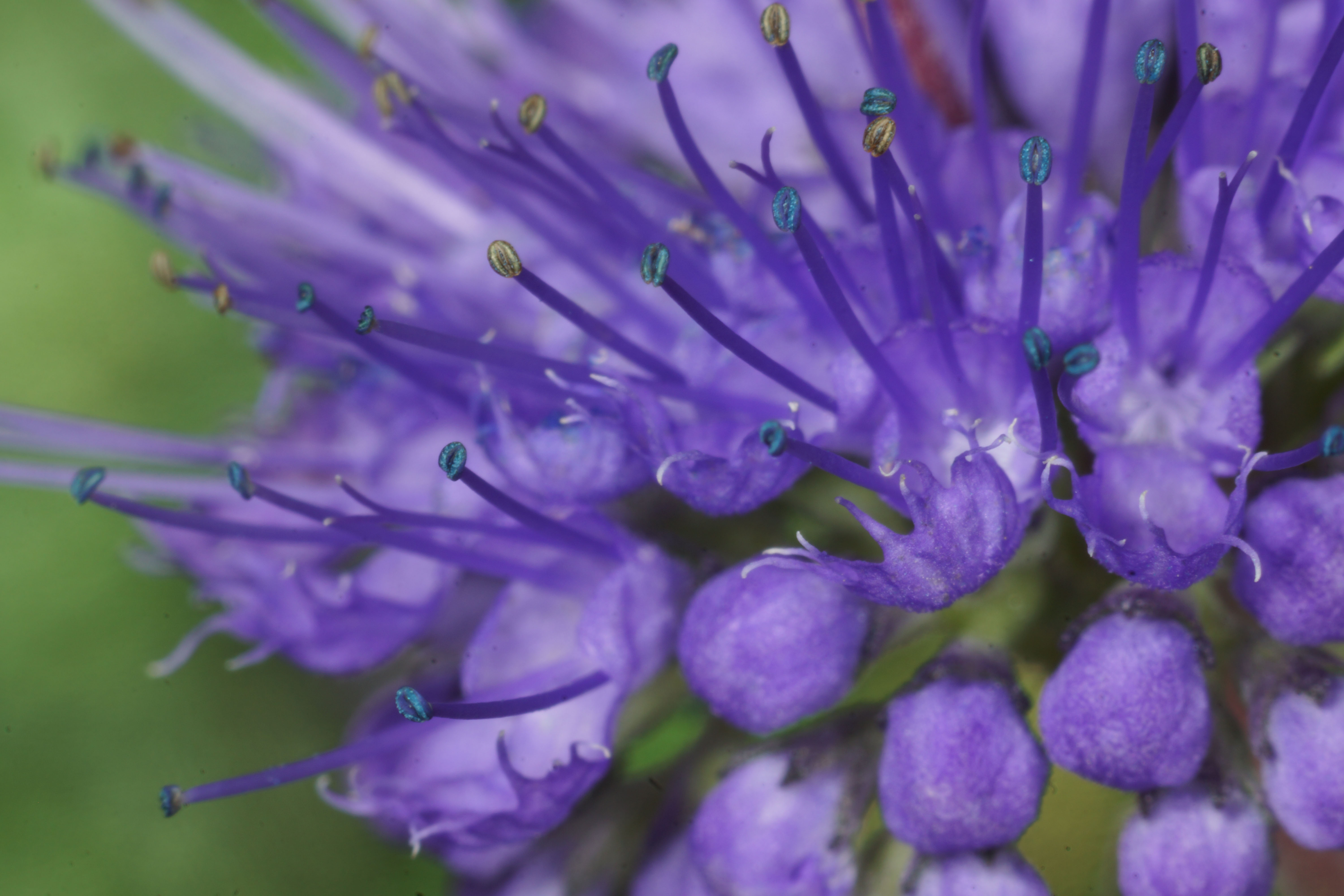
Extreme close-up of inflorescence

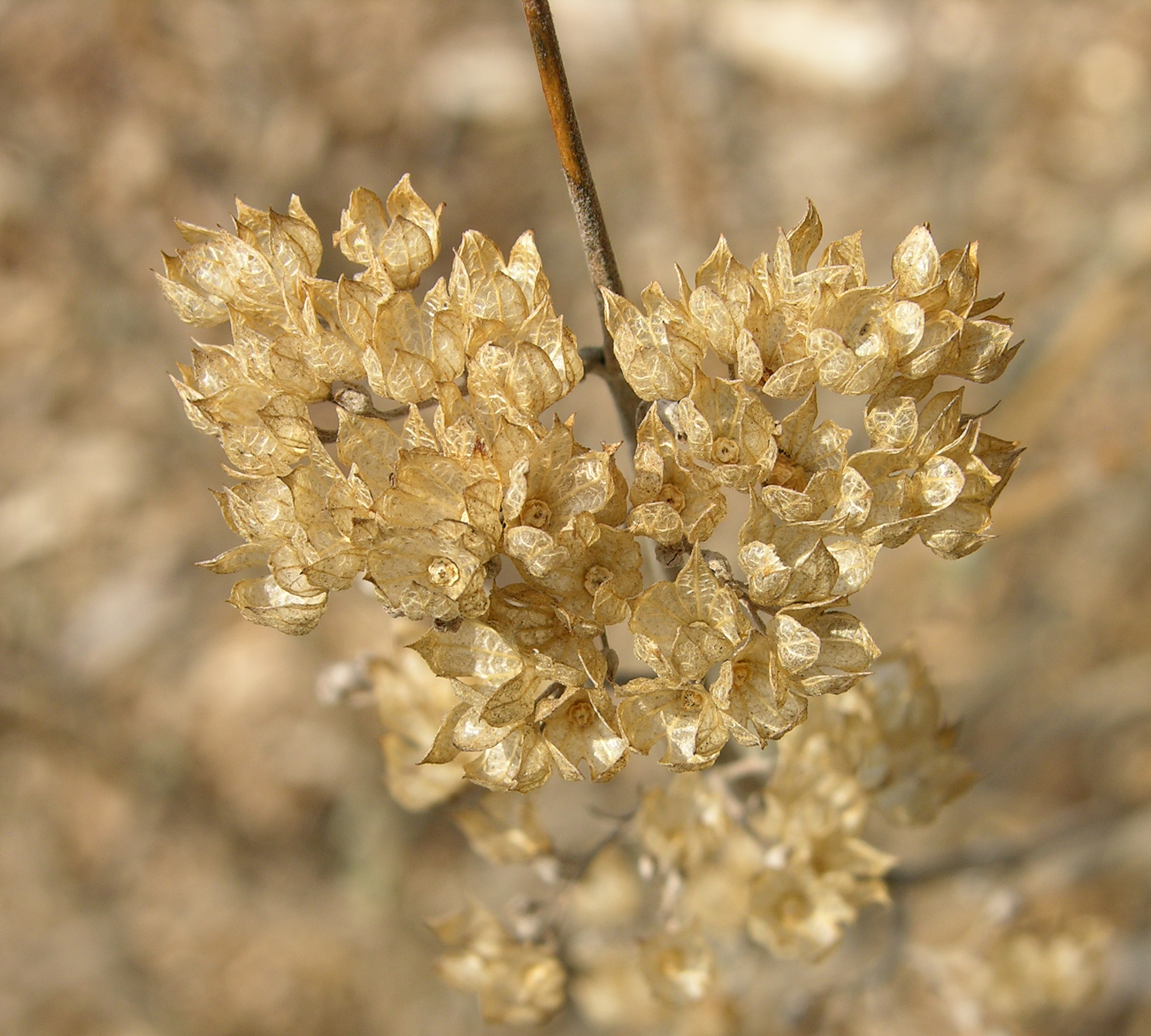
'Jason' cultivar spent flowers

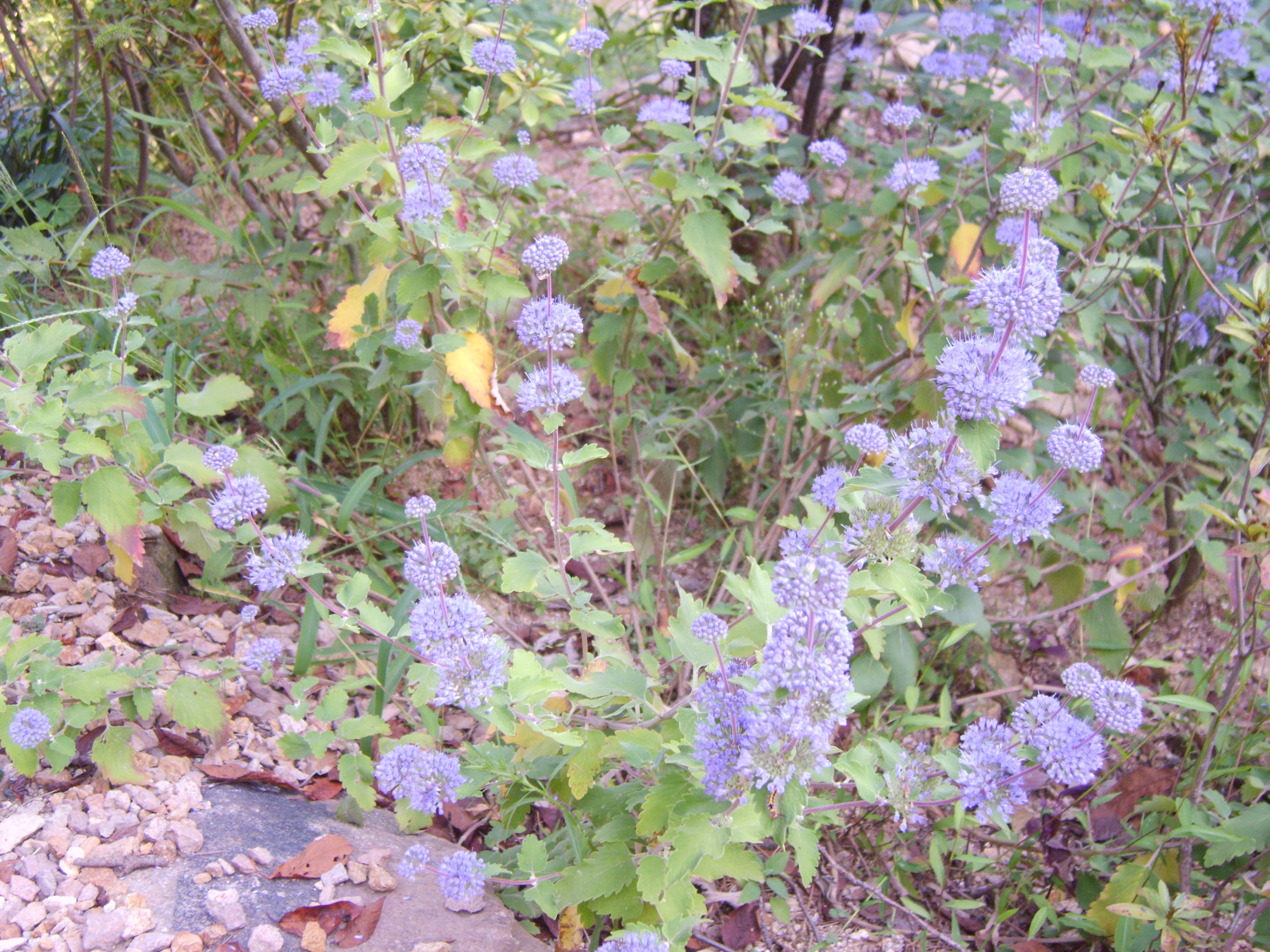
Habit
