= Teucrium betchei =

- Near Curlewis

Scientific classification
- Kingdom: Plantae
- Clade: Tracheophytes
- Clade: Angiosperms
- Clade: Eudicots
- Clade: Asterids
- Order: Lamiales
- Family: Lamiaceae
- Genus: Teucrium
- Species: T. betchei

Binomial name
- Teucrium betchei (F.Muell.) Kattari & Salmaki

Synonyms
- Oncinocalyx betchei F.Muell.

Species of flowering plant

Teucrium betchei is a species of flowering plant in the family Lamiaceae, and is endemic to eastern Australia. It is a perennial herb or undershrub with rod-like stems, linear to very narrow lance-shaped leaves and white flowers.

== Description ==
Teucrium betchei is a perennial herb that typically grows to a height of 0.4–1 m (1 ft 4 in – 3 ft 3 in) and has rod-like stems that are square in cross-section. The leaves are arranged in opposite pairs, linear to very narrow lance-shaped, 10–40 mm (0.39–1.57 in) long, 1–4 mm (0.039–0.157 in) wide and more or less sessile. The flowers are mostly arranged in groups of three to five in upper leaf axils, each flower on a pedicel 1–3 mm (0.039–0.118 in) long. The five sepals are 4–6 mm (0.16–0.24 in) long, joined at the base for about half their length. The petals are white, the lower middle lobe 1–1.5 mm (0.039–0.059 in) long. Flowering mainly occurs in summer.

== Taxonomy ==
This germander was first formally described in 1883 by Ferdinand von Mueller who gave it the name Oncinocalyx betchei in the Southern Science Record, from specimens collected in 1883 near the Namoi River at Gunnedah by Ernst Betche. In 2016, Stefan Kattari and Yasaman Salmaki changed the name to Teucrium betchei in the journal Taxon.

== Distribution and habitat ==
Teucrium betchei grows in grassy woodland and on disturbed sites, mainly on the North West Slopes of New South Wales and the Darling Downs of south-eastern Queensland.
