= Hosea lobbii =

Scientific classification
- Kingdom: Plantae
- Clade: Tracheophytes
- Clade: Angiosperms
- Clade: Eudicots
- Clade: Asterids
- Order: Lamiales
- Family: Lamiaceae
- Genus: Hosea; Ridl.
- Species: H. lobbii

Binomial name
- Hosea lobbii (C.B.Clarke) Ridl.

Synonyms
- Hoseanthus Merr. illegitimate superfluous name; Clerodendrum lobbii C.B.Clarke; Hoseanthus lobbii (C.B.Clarke) Merr.; Clerodendrum discolor Becc. 1902 not (Klotzsch) Vatke 1882

Species of flowering plant

Hosea is a genus of flowering plant in the family Lamiaceae, first described in 1908. It contains only one known species, Hosea lobbii. It is endemic to the Island of Borneo (Sultanate of Brunei + Sarawak region of Malaysia).
