= Arthur Simmonds =

English cricketer (1848–1933)

Arthur Simmonds (1 February 1848 – 2 August 1933) was an English first-class cricketer active 1871–73 who played for Surrey and Cambridge University. He was born in Godalming; died in Ascot.
