= Faradaya =

Former genus of flowering plants

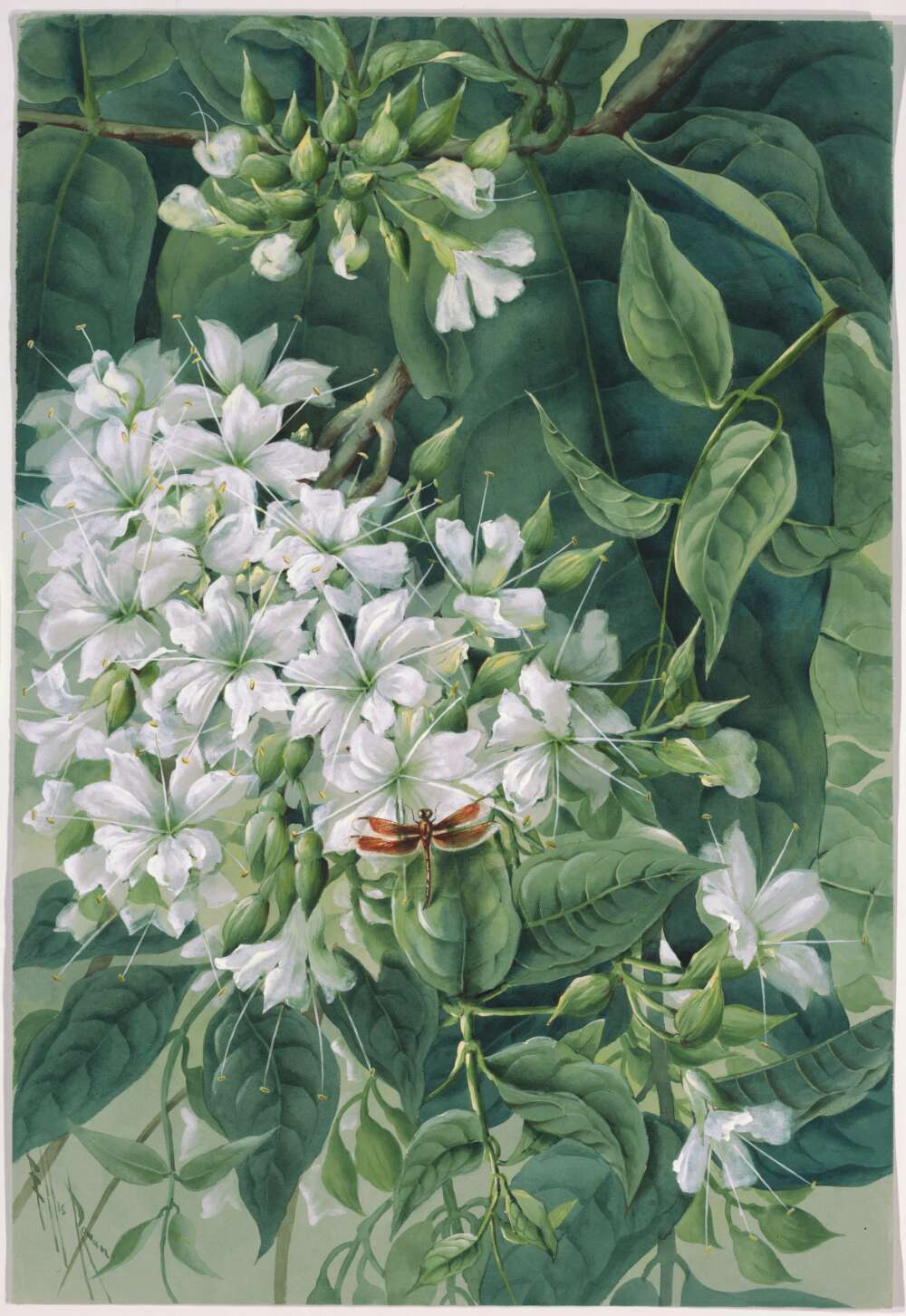
Faradaya splendida

Faradaya is a formerly accepted genus of plants in the mint family, Lamiaceae, first described in 1865 by Victorian government botanist Ferdinand von Mueller in Fragmenta Phytographiae Australiae. Following a revision of the genera Oxera, Clerodendrum, Faradaya, and Hosea in 2015, Faradaya was merged into Oxera.
