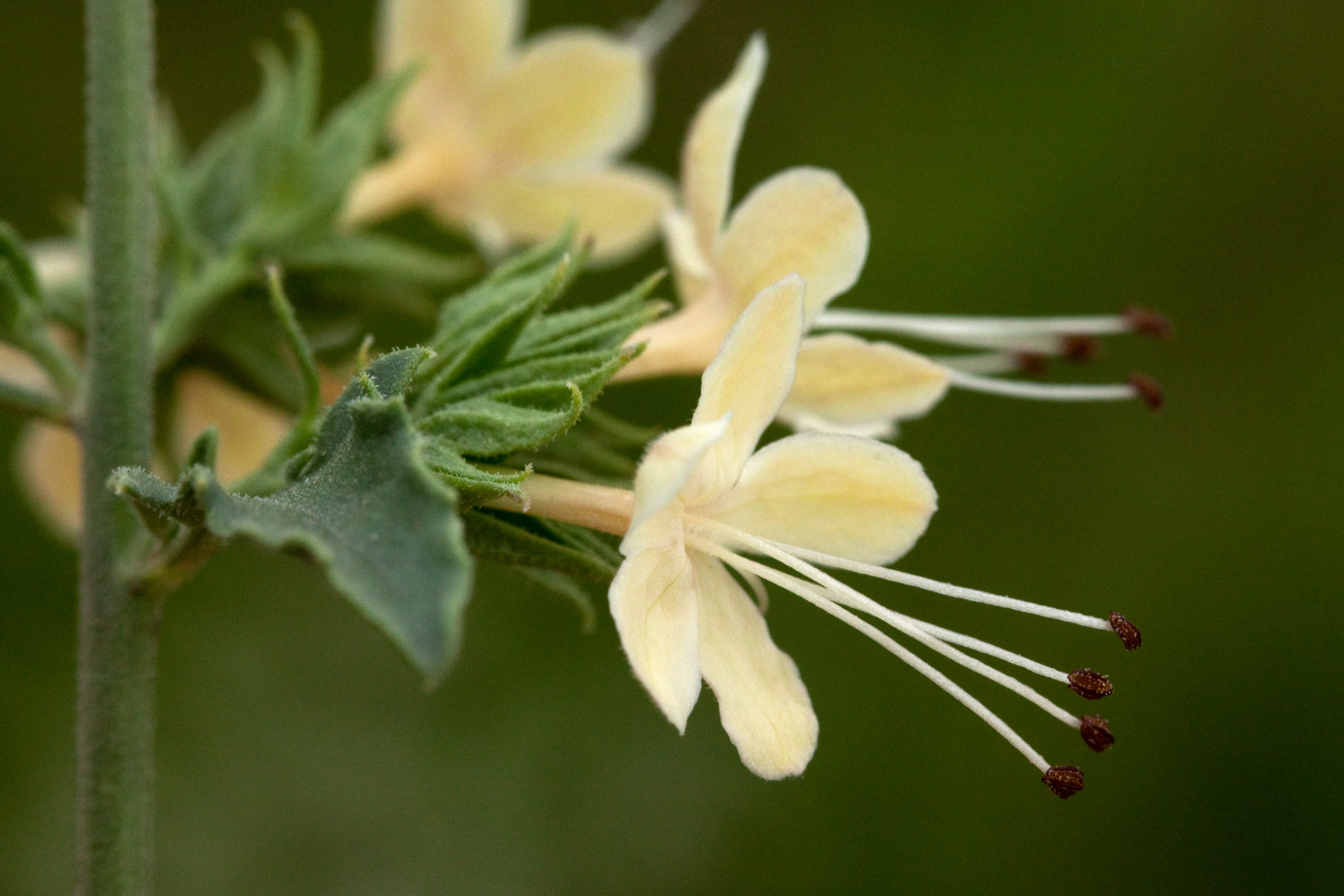

Scientific classification
- Kingdom: Plantae
- Clade: Tracheophytes
- Clade: Angiosperms
- Clade: Eudicots
- Clade: Asterids
- Order: Lamiales
- Family: Lamiaceae
- Subfamily: Ajugoideae
- Genus: Tetraclea; A.Gray

= Tetraclea =

Genus of flowering plants

Tetraclea is a genus of flowering plants belonging to the family Lamiaceae.

Its native range is Southern Central USA to Northeastern Mexico.

Species:

- Tetraclea coulteri A.Gray
