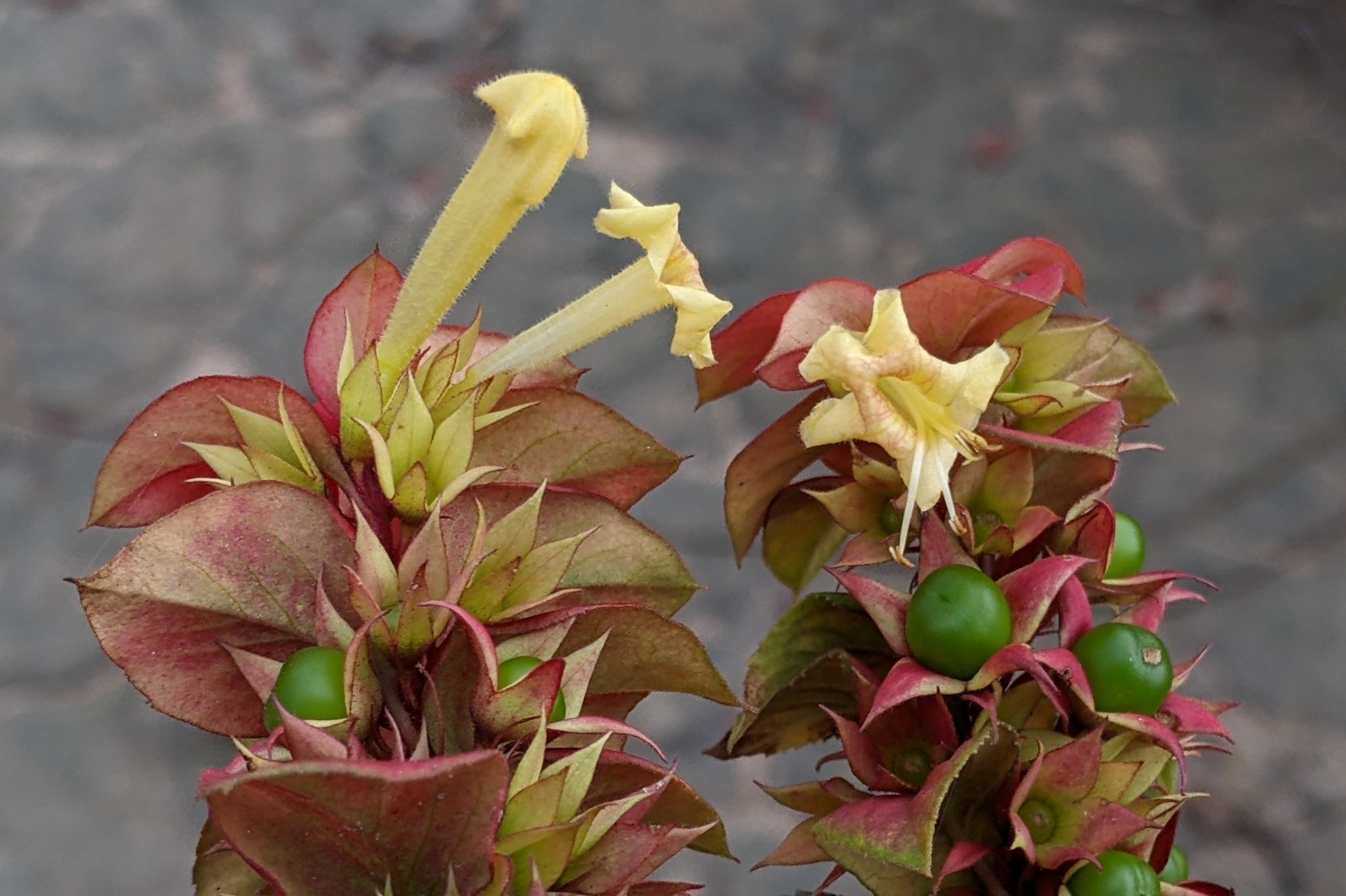
- Amasonia campestris

Scientific classification
- Kingdom: Plantae
- Clade: Tracheophytes
- Clade: Angiosperms
- Clade: Eudicots
- Clade: Asterids
- Order: Lamiales
- Family: Lamiaceae
- Subfamily: Ajugoideae
- Genus: Amasonia; L.f.

Synonyms
- Taligalea Aubl.; Diphystema Neck.

= Amasonia =

Genus of flowering plants

Amasonia is a genus of plants in the family Lamiaceae, native to South America and to the island of Trinidad.

They are shrubs, subshrubs, or perennial herbs. Leaves usually alternate, bracts are brightly colored (red, purple, or yellow), and the sepals are bright red or purple.

== Species ==
Species include:

- Amasonia angustifolia Mart. & Schauer - Brazil
- Amasonia arborea Kunth - Trinidad, the Guianas, Brazil, Venezuela, Colombia, Bolivia
- Amasonia calycina Hook.f. - Brazil, Guyana
- Amasonia campestris (Aubl.) Moldenke - Trinidad, the Guianas, Brazil, Venezuela, Colombia
- Amasonia hirta Benth. - Brazil, Paraguay
- Amasonia obovata Gleason - Brazil, Cerro Duida in Venezuela
