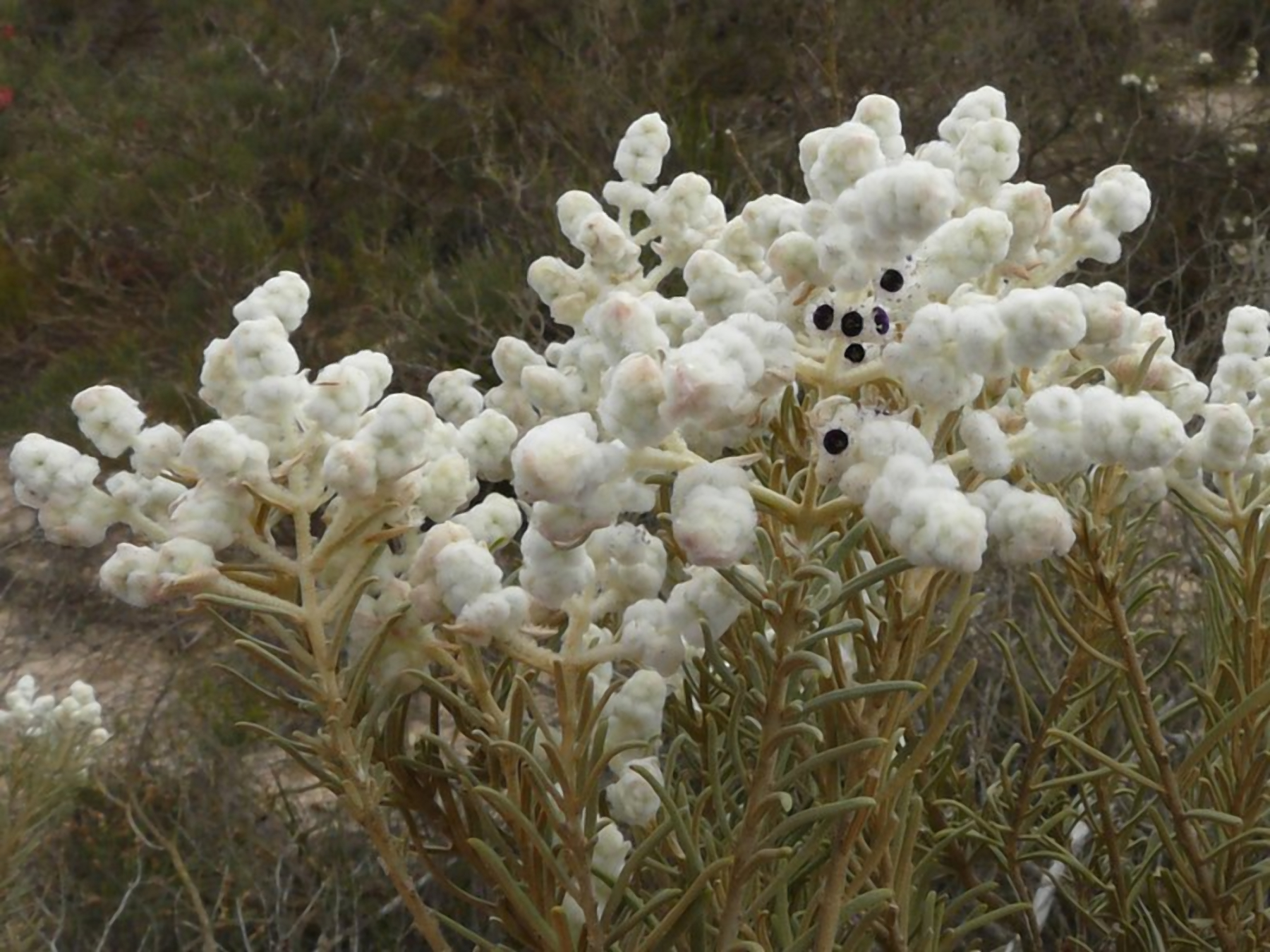
- Lachnostachys eriobotrya

Scientific classification
- Kingdom: Plantae
- Clade: Tracheophytes
- Clade: Angiosperms
- Clade: Eudicots
- Clade: Asterids
- Order: Lamiales
- Family: Lamiaceae
- Subfamily: Prostantheroideae
- Genus: Lachnostachys; Hook.

Type species
- Lachnostachys ferruginea

Synonyms
- Walcottia F.Muell.; Pycnolachne Turcz.

= Lachnostachys =

Genus of flowering plants

Lachnostachys (common name Lambs tails) is a genus of flowering plants in the mint family, Lamiaceae, first described in 1842 by William Jackson Hooker. The type species is Lachnostachys ferruginea. The genus name, Lachnostachys, comes from two Greek words/roots, lachnề ("wool") and -stachys ("relating to a spike"), and thus describes the genus as having spiked woolly inflorescences. The entire genus is endemic to Western Australia

A 2009 study of Chloantheae indicates that Lachnostachys is closely related to the genera, Newcastelia and Physopsis, with none of the three being monophyletic.

== Description ==
Plants in this genus are shrubs or subshrub growing from 0.3 to 1.5 m high. They have no essential oils. The young stems are cylindrical and are covered in a dense and thick woolly covering of branched woolly intertwined hairs. The leaves are opposite and decussate (i.e., with successive opposite pairs at right angles to the preceding pair). The leaf blades are entire, or recurved along the margins, or sometimes flat. They are pinnately veined. They are woolly both abaxially and adaxially, although mature leaf blades are sometimes rugose (wrinkled) and glabrescent (becoming hairless). The leaves have both simple and complex hairs (which are stellate).

Species

- Lachnostachys albicans Hook.
- Lachnostachys bracteosa C.A.Gardner
- Lachnostachys coolgardiensis S.Moore
- Lachnostachys eriobotrya (F.Muell.) Druce
- Lachnostachys ferruginea Hook.
- Lachnostachys verbascifolia F.Muell
