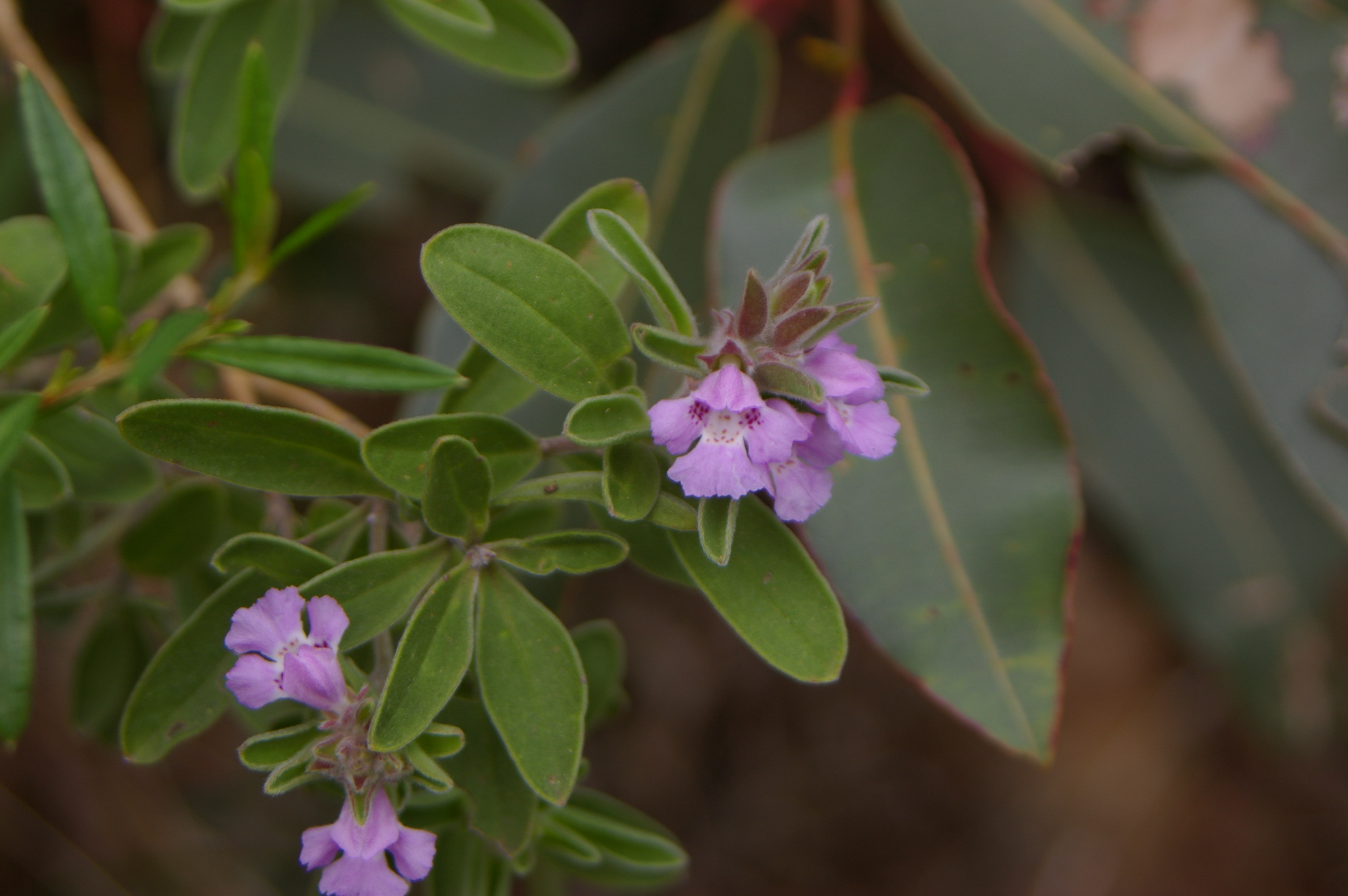
- Hemigenia incana at Gooseberry Hill National Park

Scientific classification
- Kingdom: Plantae
- Clade: Tracheophytes
- Clade: Angiosperms
- Clade: Eudicots
- Clade: Asterids
- Order: Lamiales
- Family: Lamiaceae
- Subfamily: Prostantheroideae
- Genus: Hemigenia; R.Br.

Synonyms
- Atelandra Lindl.; Colobandra Bartl.

= Hemigenia =

Genus of flowering plants

Hemigenia is a genus of flowering plants in the mint family, Lamiaceae and is endemic to Australia where most species occur in Western Australia, although some are also found in New South Wales and Queensland. Plants in this genus are shrubs or bushes with simple leaves and tube-shaped flowers with the petals forming two "lips" - the upper one with two lobes and the lower one with three.

== Description ==
Plants in the genus Hemigenia are shrubs or bushes with simple leaves which are arranged either in opposite pairs or in whorls. The flowers are arranged singly or in groups in upper leaf axils, often appearing to form a spike of flowers. There are five sepals which are joined at their base to form a tube. The five petals form a tube with two "lips" - an upper lip with two lobes and a lower one with three. There are four stamens.

Plants in this genus can be distinguished from those in the similar and closely related Hemiandra by their less strongly odoriferous leaves and from Prostanthera, Microcorys and Westringia by technical differences in their stamens.

== Taxonomy ==
The genus Hemigenia was first formally described in 1810 by Robert Brown and the description was published in Prodromus Florae Novae Hollandiae. Brown nominated Hemigenia purpurea the type species. The genus name is derived from the Ancient Greek words hemi and genias meaning "a beard" referring to a part of the anthers.

== Distribution ==
Hemigenia species are mostly endemic to Western Australia, but H. cuneifolia occurs in New South Wales and Queensland, H. biddulphiana grows in Queensland and H. purpurea in New South Wales.

=== Species list ===
The following is a list of Hemigenia species accepted by the Australian Plant Census as at November 2020:

- Hemigenia appressa G.R.Guerin
- Hemigenia argentea Bartl.
- Hemigenia barbata Bartl.
- Hemigenia benthamii G.R.Guerin
- Hemigenia biddulphiana F.Muell.
- Hemigenia botryphylla G.R.Guerin
- Hemigenia brachyphylla F.Muell.
- Hemigenia bracteosa G.R.Guerin
- Hemigenia buccinata G.R.Guerin
- Hemigenia canescens (Bartl.) Benth.
- Hemigenia ciliata G.R.Guerin
- Hemigenia coccinea C.A.Gardner
- Hemigenia conferta B.J.Conn
- Hemigenia cuneifolia Benth.
- Hemigenia curvifolia F.Muell.
- Hemigenia dielsii (Hemsl.) C.A.Gardner
- Hemigenia diplanthera F.Muell.
- Hemigenia divaricata C.A.Gardner
- Hemigenia drummondii Benth.
- Hemigenia dulcis G.R.Guerin
- Hemigenia exilis S.Moore
- Hemigenia humilis Benth.
- Hemigenia incana (Lindl.) Benth.
- Hemigenia loganiacea (F.Muell.) F.Muell.
- Hemigenia macphersonii Luehm.
- Hemigenia macrantha F.Muell.
- Hemigenia microphylla Benth.
- Hemigenia obovata F.Muell.
- Hemigenia obtusa Benth. - blunt-leaved hemigenia
- Hemigenia pachyphylla G.R.Guerin
- Hemigenia parviflora Bartl.
- Hemigenia pedunculata Diels
- Hemigenia pimeleifolia F.Muell.
- Hemigenia platyphylla (Bartl.) Benth.
- Hemigenia podalyrina F.Muell.
- Hemigenia pritzelii S.Moore
- Hemigenia purpurea R.Br.
- Hemigenia ramosissima Benth.
- Hemigenia rigida Benth.
- Hemigenia royceana G.R.Guerin
- Hemigenia saligna Diels
- Hemigenia scabra Benth.
- Hemigenia sericea Benth. - silky hemigenia
- Hemigenia tenelliflora G.R.Guerin
- Hemigenia teretiuscula F.Muell.
- Hemigenia tichbonii K.R.Thiele & G.R.Guerin
- Hemigenia tomentosa G.R.Guerin
- Hemigenia tysonii F.Muell.
- Hemigenia virescens G.R.Guerin
- Hemigenia viscida S.Moore - sticky hemigenia
- Hemigenia wandooana G.R.Guerin
- Hemigenia westringioides Benth. - open hemigenia
- Hemigenia yalgensis G.R.Guerin
