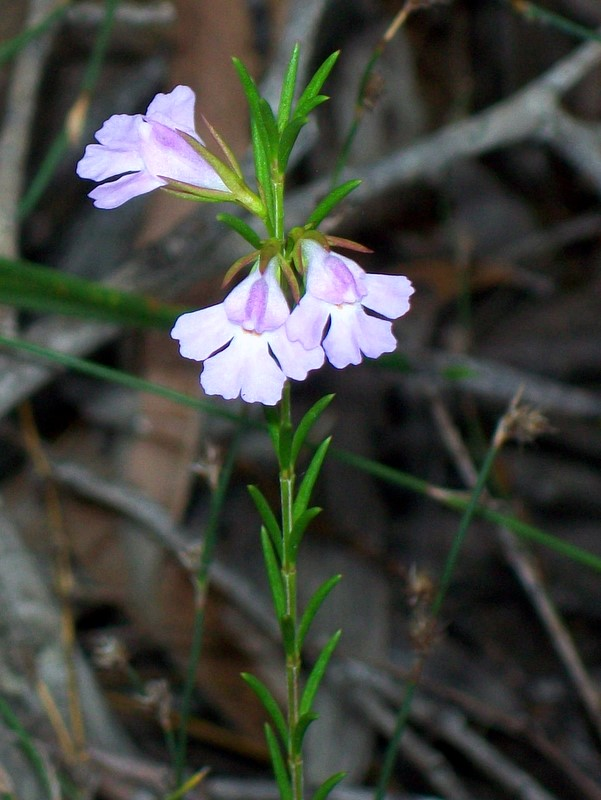
- Hemigenia purpurea at Ku-ring-gai Chase National Park, Australia

Scientific classification
- Kingdom: Plantae
- Clade: Tracheophytes
- Clade: Angiosperms
- Clade: Eudicots
- Clade: Asterids
- Order: Lamiales
- Family: Lamiaceae
- Genus: Hemigenia
- Species: H. purpurea

Binomial name
- Hemigenia purpurea R.Br.

= Hemigenia purpurea =

Narrow-leaved hemigenia

Species of plant

Hemigenia purpurea, with the common name of narrow-leaved hemigenia is a small plant growing in the Sydney and Nowra districts of eastern Australia. Often found in poor soils in heathland with a relatively high rainfall. By the coast or in the Blue Mountains.

A small shrub up to 2 metres tall. Leaves in whorls of three. The leaves are hairless, narrow, 1 to 1.6 cm long and 1 mm wide. They are wedged shape with an acute angle at the base of the leaf and narrow and pointed at the end of the leaf. The leaf stem is 2 to 4 mm long. Flowers are blue or violet and appear mostly from August to April.

Hemigenia purpurea appears similar to certain plants of the genus Prostanthera; however, it is distinguished by the thin leaves.
