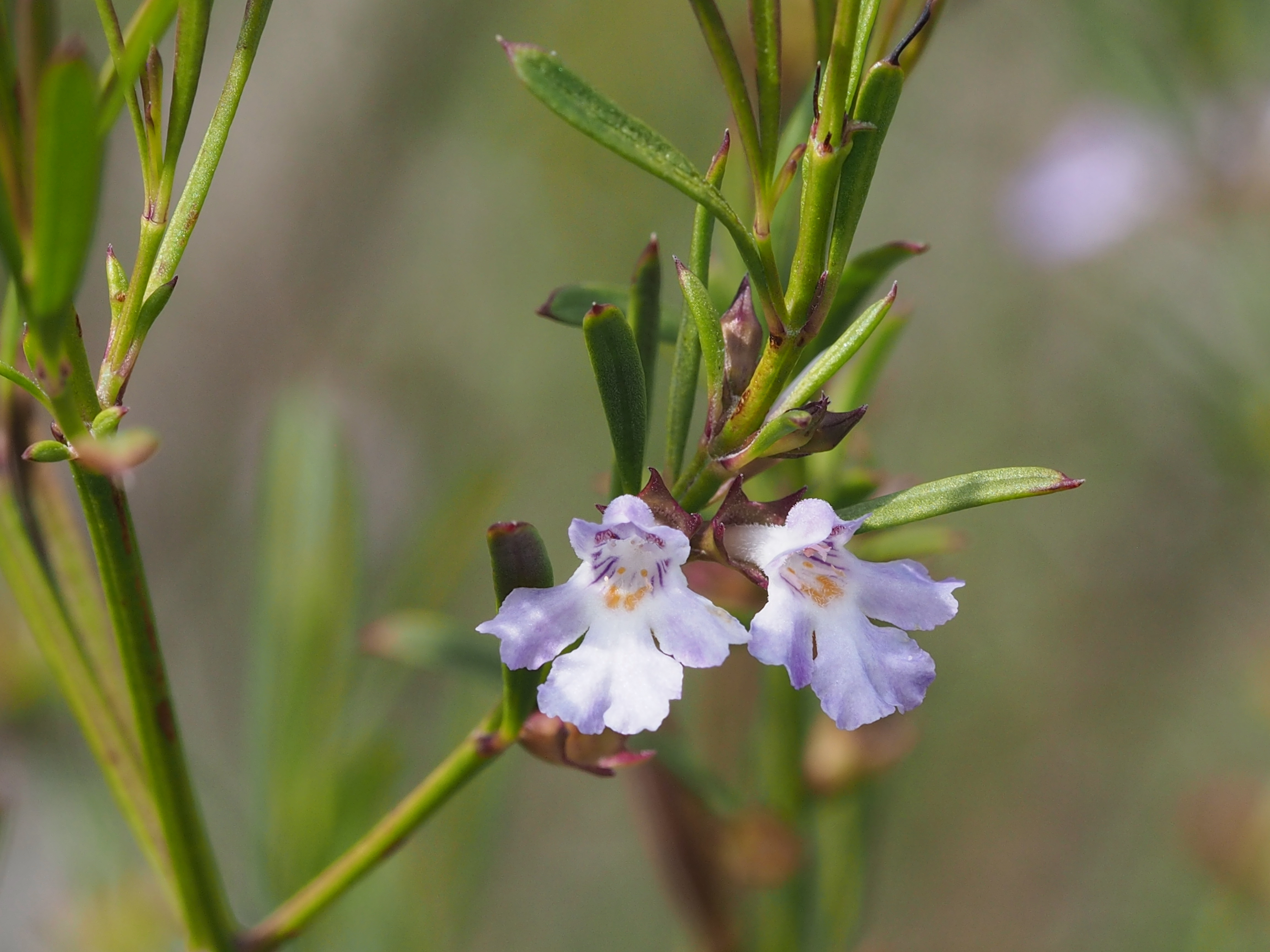
- In Girraween National Park

Scientific classification
- Kingdom: Plantae
- Clade: Tracheophytes
- Clade: Angiosperms
- Clade: Eudicots
- Clade: Asterids
- Order: Lamiales
- Family: Lamiaceae
- Genus: Hemigenia
- Species: H. cuneifolia

Binomial name
- Hemigenia cuneifolia Benth.

= Hemigenia cuneifolia =

Species of flowering plant

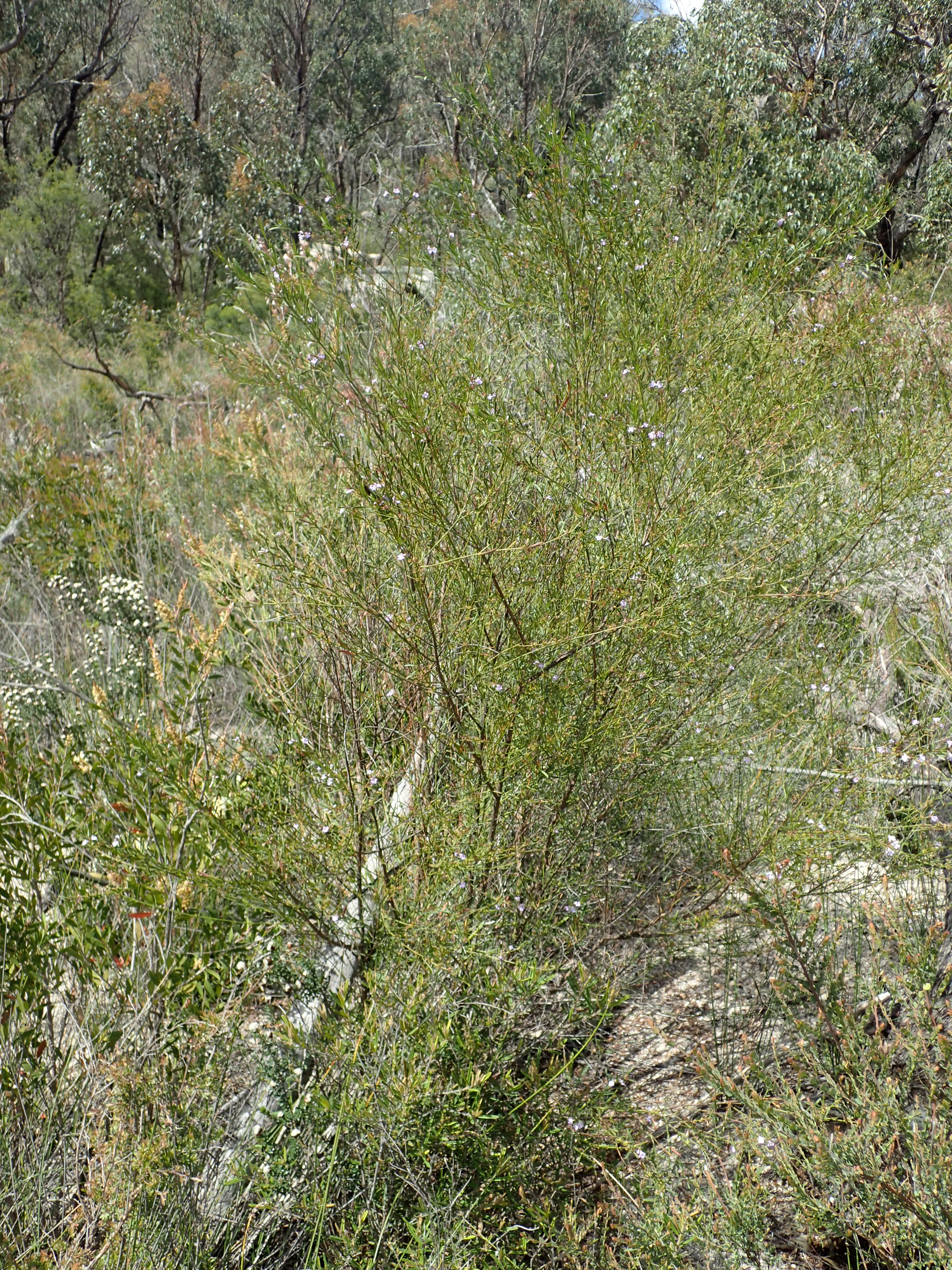
Habit

Hemigenia cuneifolia is a plant in the family Lamiaceae and is endemic to eastern Australia. It is a shrub with oblong leaves arranged in whorls of three, and blue to mauve flowers.

== Description ==
Hemigenia cuneifolia is a shrub that typically grows to a height of about 2.5 m (8 ft 2 in). The leaves are oblong, 15–30 mm (0.59–1.18 in) long, 2–4 mm (0.079–0.157 in) wide on a petiole 2–6 mm (0.079–0.236 in) long and arranged in whorls of three. The sepals are fused to form a tube 4–5.5 mm (0.16–0.22 in) long with five lobes that are shorter than the tube. The petals are blue to mauve, about 8 mm (0.31 in) long and fused to form a tube with two lips. There are four stamens, the lower two more or less sterile, and the style has two branches. Flowering mainly occurs from August to April.

== Taxonomy and naming ==
Hemigenia cuneifolia was first formally described in 1870 by George Bentham and the description was published in Flora Australiensis from specimens collected by William Woolls and Hermann Beckler.

== Distribution and habitat ==
Hemigenia cuneifolia grows in forest from south east Queensland to the Hill Top area of New South Wales and as far inland as the Pilliga Scrub.
