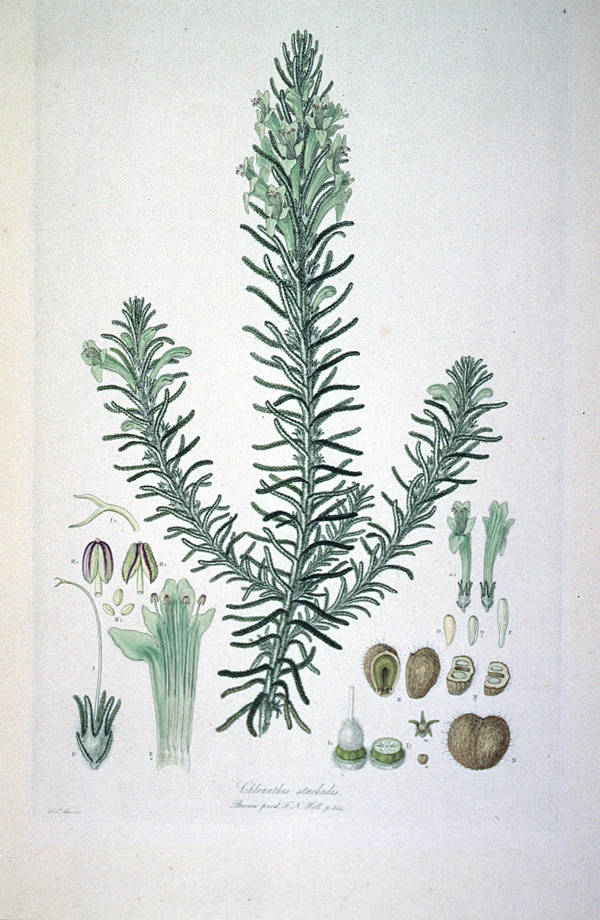
- Illustration of Chloanthes stoechadis from Illustrationes Florae Novae Hollandiae

Scientific classification
- Kingdom: Plantae
- Clade: Tracheophytes
- Clade: Angiosperms
- Clade: Eudicots
- Clade: Asterids
- Order: Lamiales
- Family: Lamiaceae
- Subfamily: Prostantheroideae
- Genus: Chloanthes; R.Br.

Type species
- Chloanthes stoechadis R.Br.

Synonyms
- Cloanthe Nees; Hemistemon F.Muell.

= Chloanthes =

Genus of flowering plants

Chloanthes is a genus of four species of flowering plants in the family Lamiaceae and is endemic to Australia. Plants in this genus are shrubs with hairy foliage, blistered or wrinkly leaves and flowers with five petals fused at the base, usually with two "lips".

== Description ==
Plants in the genus Chloanthes are shrubs with woolly-hairy foliage, erect stems and simple, sessile, decussate or whorled leaves with blistered or wrinkly edges and that more or less hide the branches. The flowers are arranged singly in leaf axils and are sessile, with bracts and bracteoles. The sepals are fused at the base with five lobes. The five petals are fused at the base with two "lips", the upper lip with two lobes and the lower lip with three, the middle lower lip larger than the others. There are four stamens attached near the middle of the petal tube. The fruit is a drupe with four locules, each containing a single seed.

== Taxonomy ==
The genus Chloanthes was first formally described in 1810 by Robert Brown in his Prodromus Florae Novae Hollandiae et Insulae Van Diemen. In 1960, Arthur Allman Bullock nominated C. stoechadis as the type species, because it was "better known" in herbaria than the other species, C. glandulosa included in Brown's descriptions.

=== Species list ===
The following is a list of species of Chloanthes accepted by the Australian Plant Census as at May 2021:

- Chloanthes coccinea Bartl. - Western Australia
- Chloanthes glandulosa R.Br. - New South Wales
- Chloanthes parviflora Walp. - New South Wales, Queensland
- Chloanthes stoechadis R.Br - New South Wales, Queensland, Western Australia
