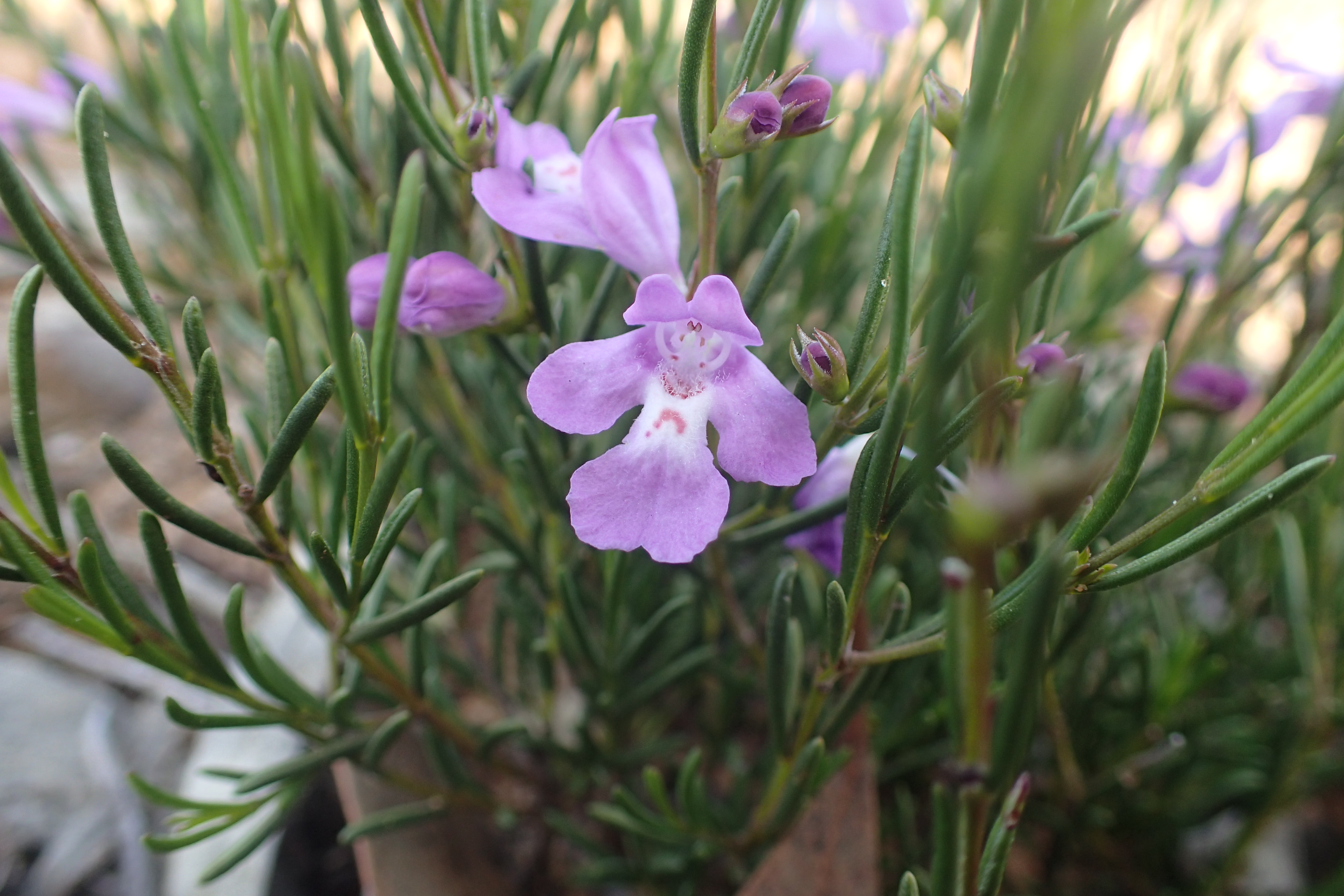

Scientific classification
- Kingdom: Plantae
- Clade: Tracheophytes
- Clade: Angiosperms
- Clade: Eudicots
- Clade: Asterids
- Order: Lamiales
- Family: Lamiaceae
- Genus: Hemigenia
- Species: H. teretiuscula

Binomial name
- Hemigenia teretiuscula F.Muell.

Synonyms
- Hemigenia eutaxioides C.R.P.Andrews

= Hemigenia teretiuscula =

Species of plant

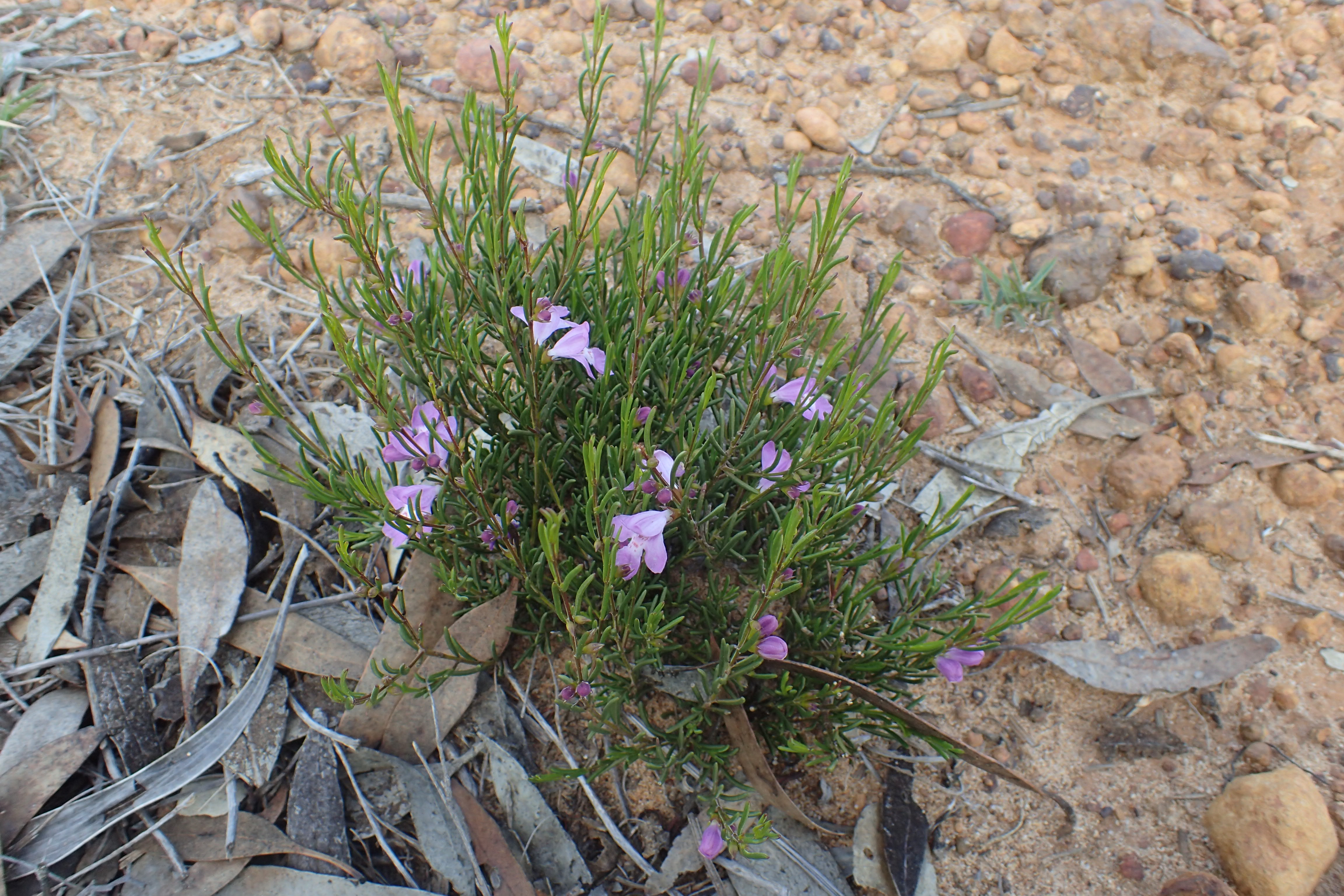
Habit near Ravensthorpe

Hemigenia teretiuscula is a species of flowering plant in the family Lamiaceae and is endemic to the southwest of Western Australia. It is an upright, glabrous shrub that typically grows to a height of 10–80 cm (3.9–31.5 in), the leaves about 1 mm (0.039 in) in diameter, more or less tapering cylindrical and somewhat sharply pointed. Flowering usually occurs from August to December and the flowers are bluish-purple.

This species was first formally described in 1868 by Ferdinand von Mueller in Fragmenta Phytographiae Australiae from specimens collected by George Maxwell. The specific epithet (teretiuscula) means "somewhat terete".

Hemigenia teretiuscula grows in gravelly or rocky soils or yellow sand in the Coolgardie, Esperance Plains and Mallee bioregions of south-western Western Australia. It is listed as "not threatened" by the Government of Western Australia Department of Biodiversity, Conservation and Attractions.
