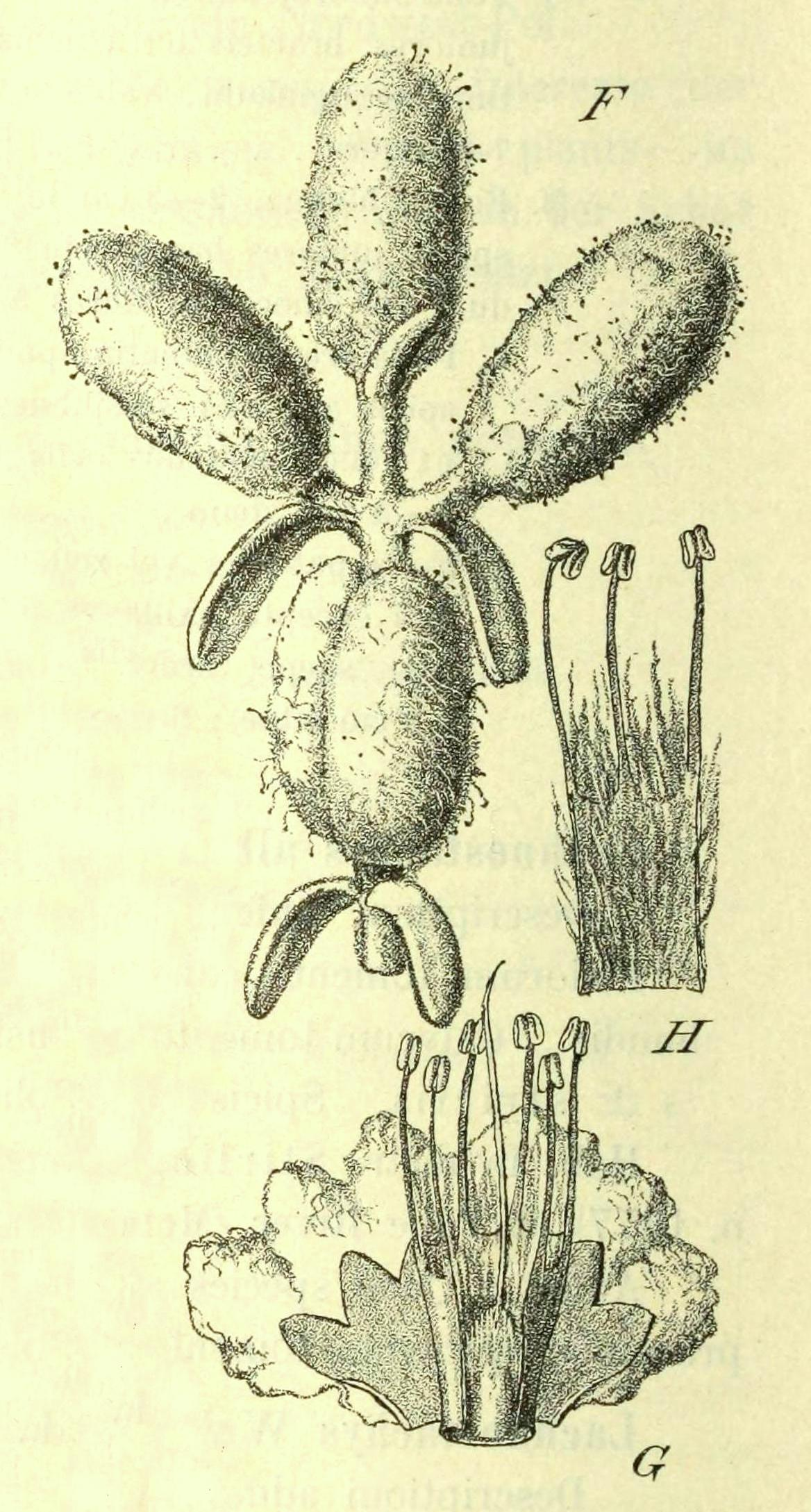
- Lachnostachys albicans

Scientific classification
- Kingdom: Plantae
- Clade: Tracheophytes
- Clade: Angiosperms
- Clade: Eudicots
- Clade: Asterids
- Order: Lamiales
- Family: Lamiaceae
- Subfamily: Prostantheroideae; Luerss.

= Prostantheroideae =

Subfamily of flowering plants in the sage family

Prostantheroideae is a subfamily of plants in the family Lamiaceae, endemic to Australia.

Genera include:

- Brachysola
- Chloanthes
- Cyanostegia
- Dasymalla
- Dicrastylis
- Hemiandra
- Hemigenia
- Hemiphora
- Lachnostachys
- Microcorys
- Muniria
- Newcastelia
- Physopsis
- Pityrodia
- Prostanthera
- Quoya
- Westringia
