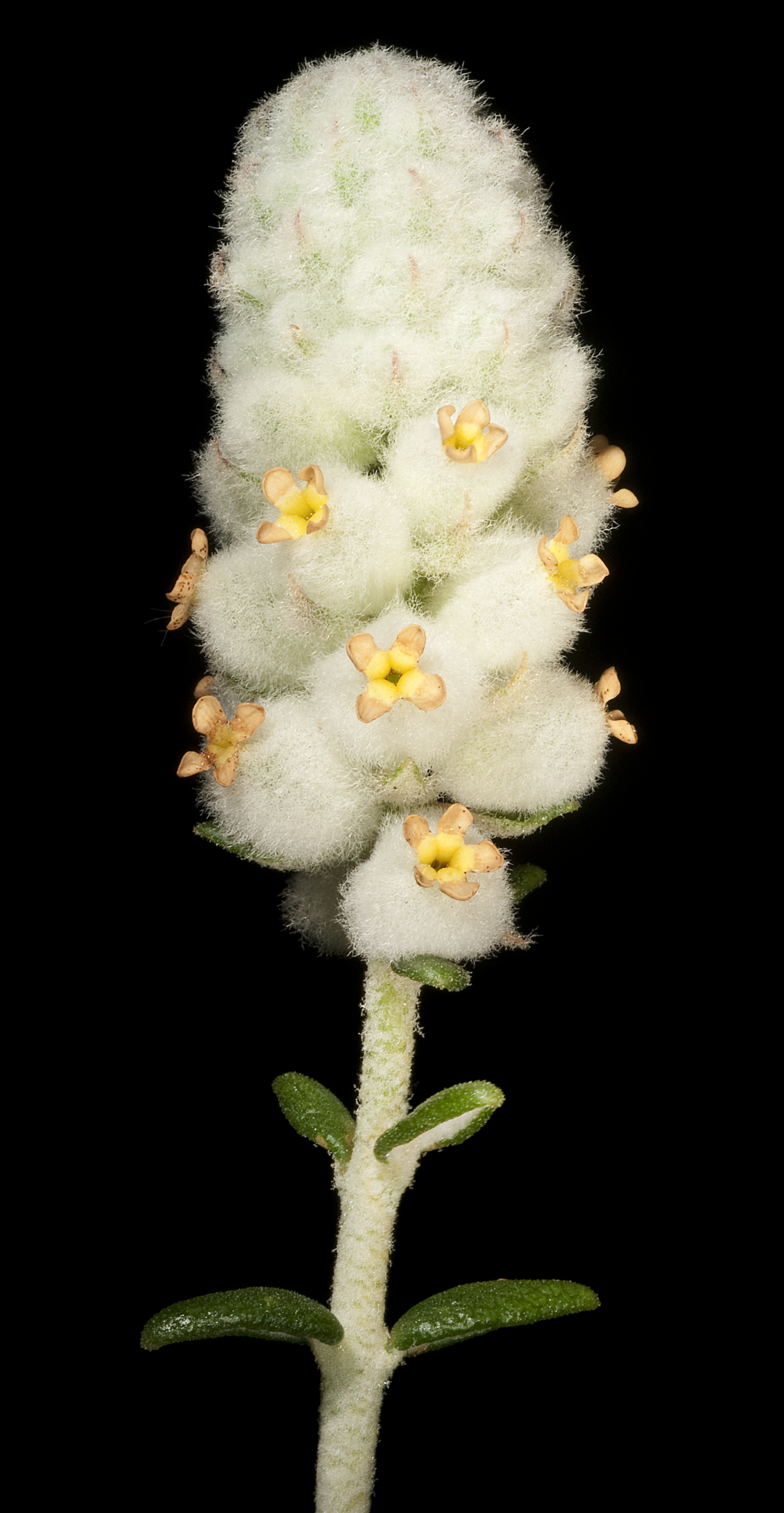

Scientific classification
- Kingdom: Plantae
- Clade: Tracheophytes
- Clade: Angiosperms
- Clade: Eudicots
- Clade: Asterids
- Order: Lamiales
- Family: Lamiaceae
- Genus: Physopsis
- Species: P. spicata

Binomial name
- Physopsis spicata Turcz.
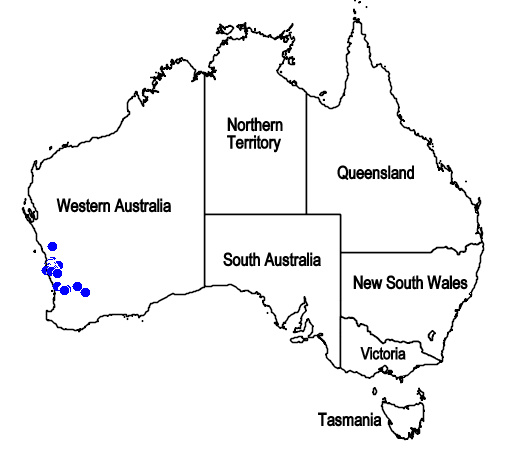

= Physopsis spicata =

Species of flowering plant

Physopsis spicata is a plant in the Lamiaceae family, first described in 1849 by Nikolai Turczaninow/

It is found in Western Australia.
