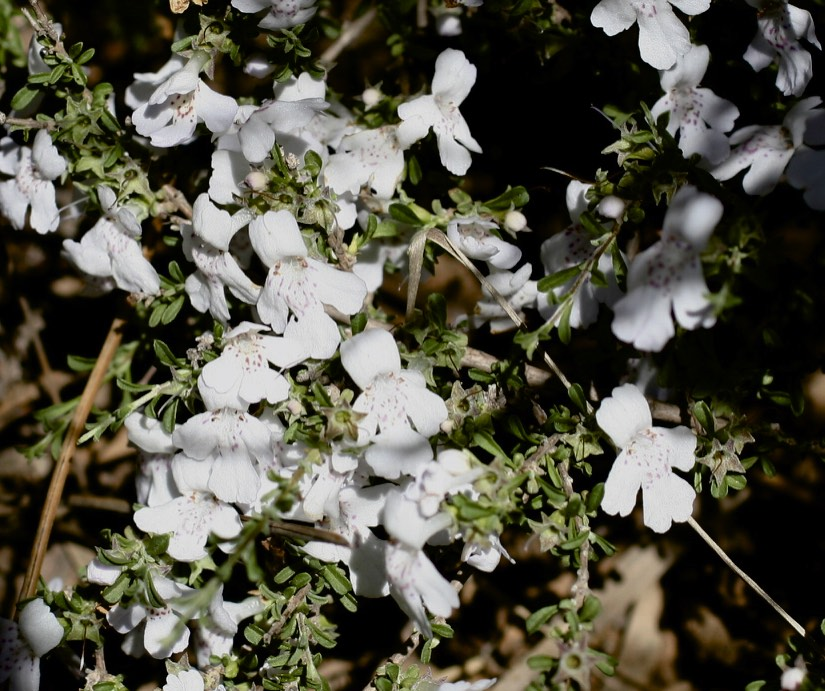
- Hemigenia scabra

Scientific classification
- Kingdom: Plantae
- Clade: Tracheophytes
- Clade: Angiosperms
- Clade: Eudicots
- Clade: Asterids
- Order: Lamiales
- Family: Lamiaceae
- Genus: Hemigenia
- Species: H. scabra

Binomial name
- Hemigenia scabra Benth.

= Hemigenia scabra =

Species of plant

Hemigenia scabra is an open, sprawling shrub with white flowers, hairy stems and foliage and is endemic to Western Australia.

== Description ==
Hemigenia scabra is an open, wiry, small shrub 0.3–1.2 m (1 ft 0 in – 3 ft 11 in) high. The stems in cross section may be more or less round or square and bracteoles 2.5–5 mm (0.098–0.197 in) long. The leaves 5–20 mm (0.20–0.79 in) long, 2.5–10 mm (0.098–0.394 in) wide, arranged opposite, rounded or squared at the apex and the margins smooth. Both stems and foliage have rough to smooth soft hairs or short coarse hairs. The bracteoles 2.5–5 mm (0.098–0.197 in) long, flowers sometimes with a pedicel 0.5–2.5 mm (0.020–0.098 in) long and simple hairs. The 5 calyces are 2–6 mm (0.079–0.236 in) long with occasional simple hairs. The flower petals may be white, cream or shades of purple, 9–13 mm (0.35–0.51 in) long, spot or stripes in the throat and 4 stamens. Flowering occurs from August to October.

== Taxonomy and naming ==
The species was first formally described in 1870 by George Bentham and the description was published in Flora Australiensis. The specific epithet (scabra) is derived from the Latin scaber meaning "rough", referring to the leaves and stems.

== Distribution and habitat ==
Hemigenia scabra is found growing in the Avon wheatbelt, Geraldton and the Shire of Yalgoo on and near sandplains in gravelly white or yellow sands.
