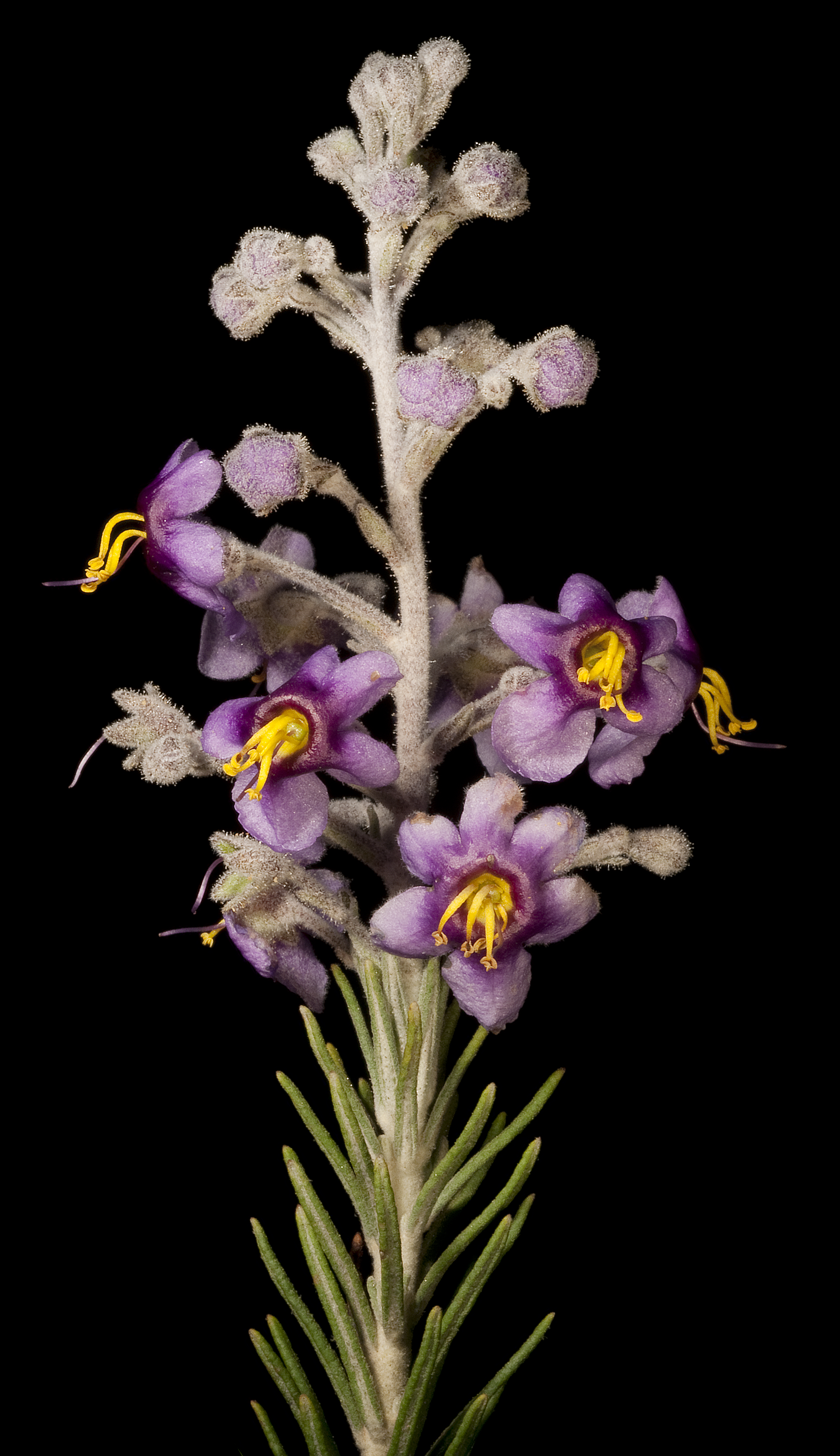
- Brachysola

Scientific classification
- Kingdom: Plantae
- Clade: Tracheophytes
- Clade: Angiosperms
- Clade: Eudicots
- Clade: Asterids
- Order: Lamiales
- Family: Lamiaceae
- Subfamily: Prostantheroideae
- Genus: Brachysola; Rye

= Brachysola =

Genus of flowering plants

Brachysola is a genus of plants in the family Lamiaceae, first described in 2000. It contains two known species, both endemic to the State of Western Australia.

- Brachysola coerulea (F.Muell. & Tate) Rye (syn Chloanthes coerulea F.Muell. & Tate, Pityrodia coerulea (F.Muell. & Tate) Ewart & Jean White)
- Brachysola halganiacea (F.Muell.) Rye (syn Chloanthes halganiacea F.Muell., Pityrodia halganiacea (F.Muell.) E.Pritz.)
