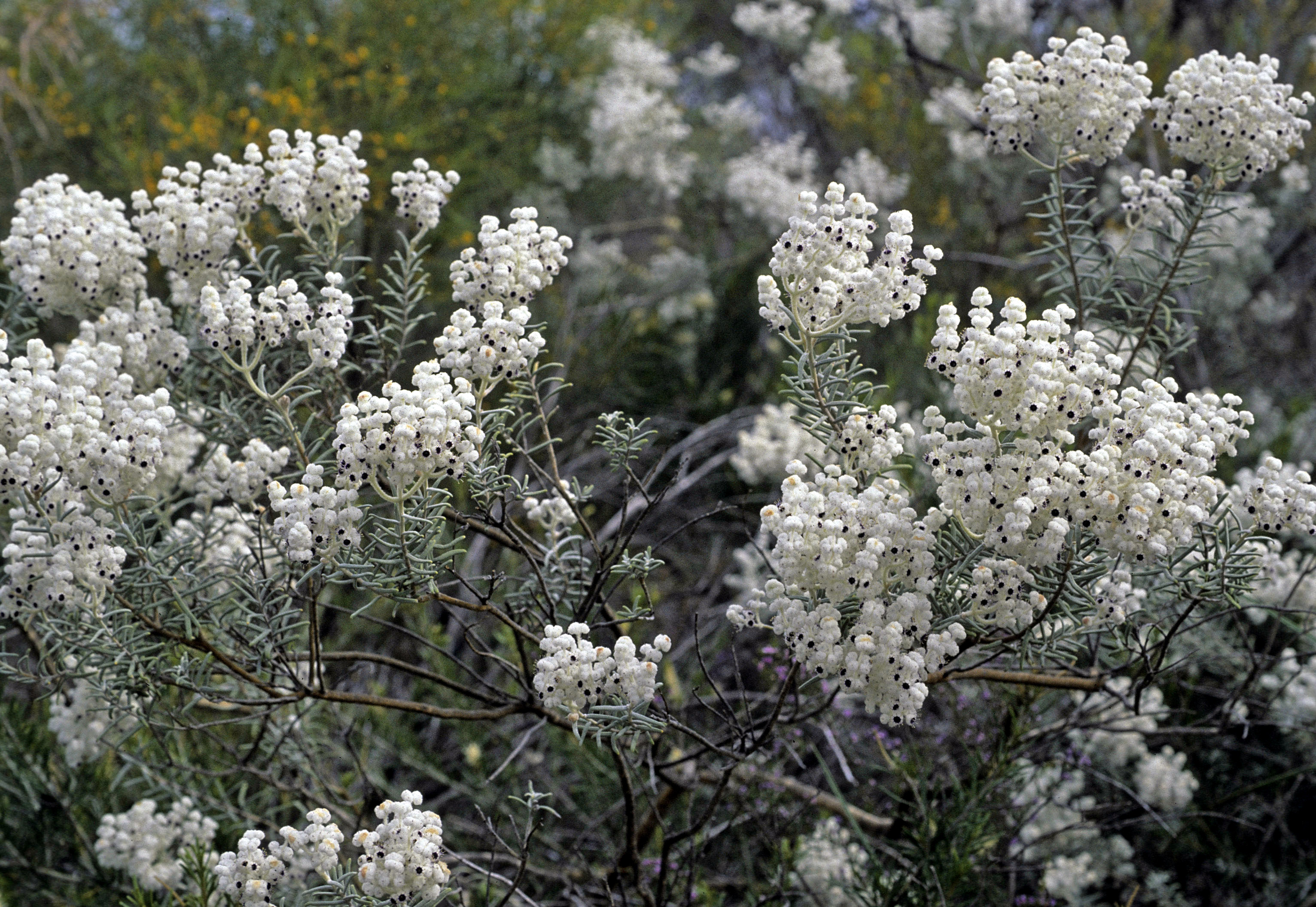
- in Kalbarri National Park

Scientific classification
- Kingdom: Plantae
- Clade: Tracheophytes
- Clade: Angiosperms
- Clade: Eudicots
- Clade: Asterids
- Order: Lamiales
- Family: Lamiaceae
- Genus: Lachnostachys
- Species: L. eriobotrya

Binomial name
- Lachnostachys eriobotrya (F.Muell.) Druce)

Synonyms
- Lachnostachys rodwayana W.Fitzg. Lachnostachys walcottii F.Muell. Pycnolachne ledifolia Turcz. Walcottia eriobotrya F.Muell.

= Lachnostachys eriobotrya =

Species of plant

Lachnostachys eriobotrya (common name - Lambswool) is a plant in the Lamiaceae family, native to Western Australia.

It was first described by Ferdinand von Mueller in 1859 as Walcottia eriobotrya, but was transferred to the genus Lachnostachys in 1917 by George Claridge Druce.
