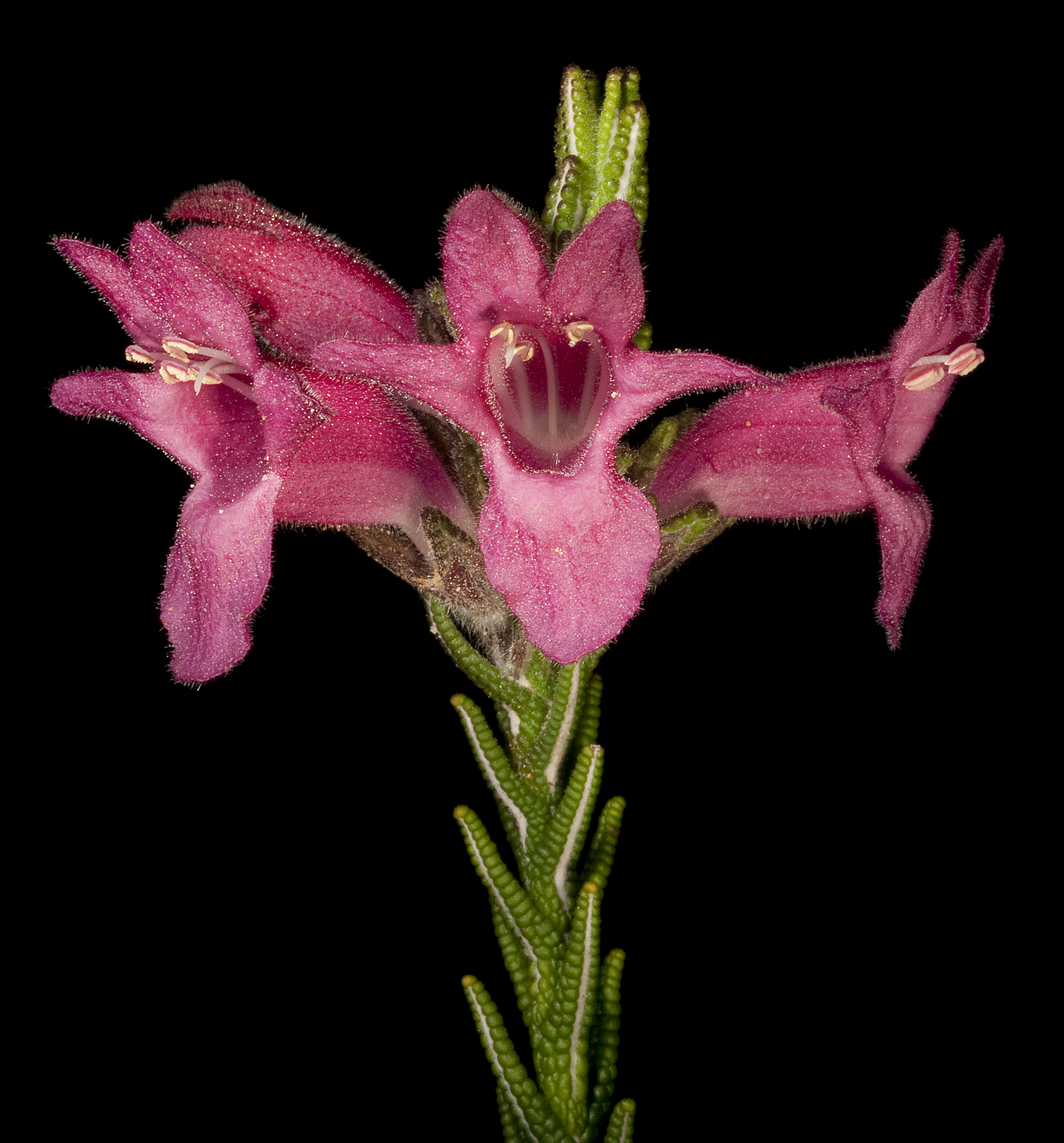

Scientific classification
- Kingdom: Plantae
- Clade: Tracheophytes
- Clade: Angiosperms
- Clade: Eudicots
- Clade: Asterids
- Order: Lamiales
- Family: Lamiaceae
- Genus: Chloanthes
- Species: C. coccinea

Binomial name
- Chloanthes coccinea Bartl.

= Chloanthes coccinea =

Species of flowering plant

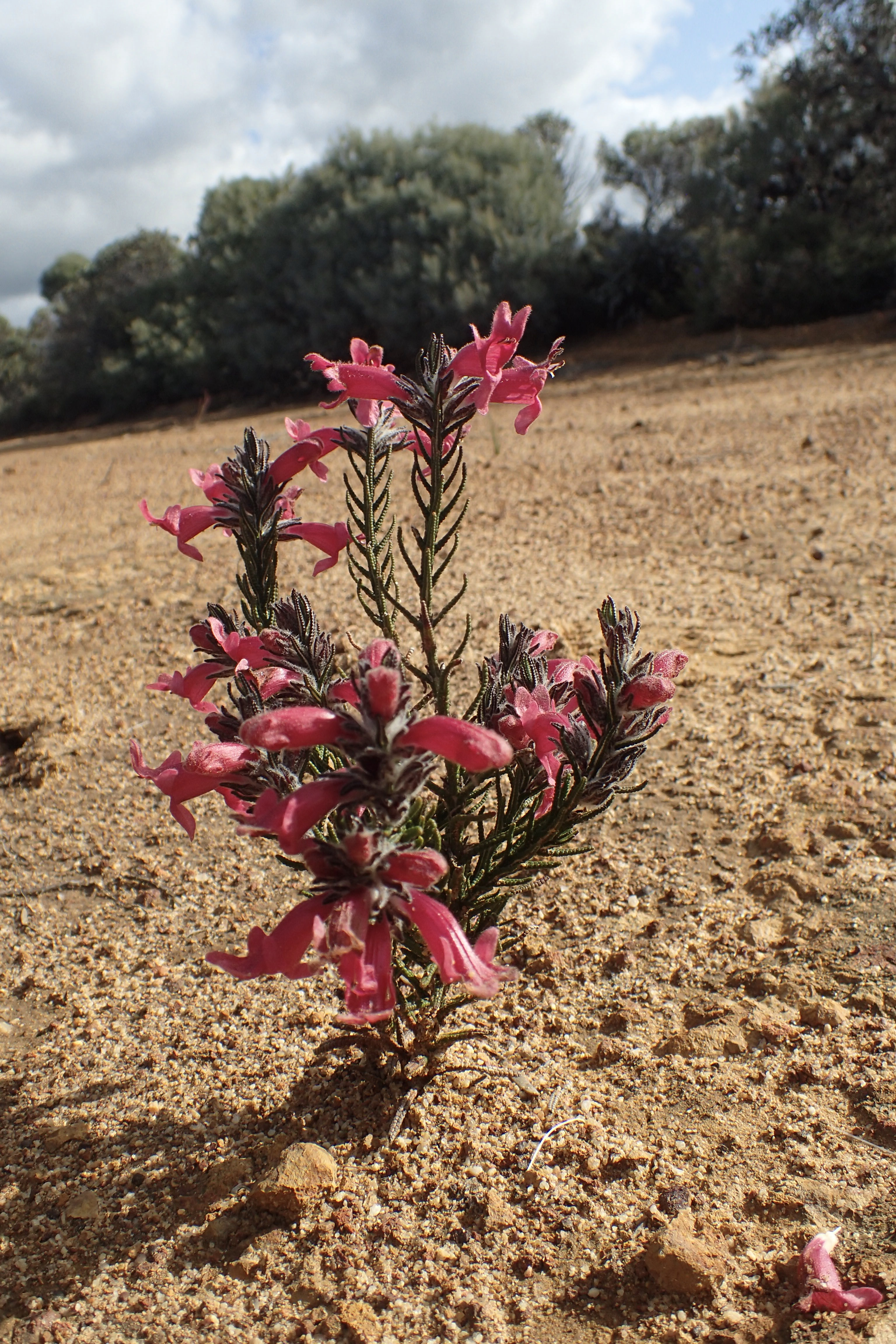
Habit near Tarin Rock

Chloanthes coccinea is a species of flowering plant in the family Lamiaceae. It is a small, sprawling shrub with scarlet or deep pink flowers. It is endemic to Western Australia.

== Description ==
Chloanthes coccinea is a small, spreading, much branched shrub with stems in cross section more or less circular. The leaves are arranged opposite, narrowly linear, almost needle-shaped due to rolled margins, 0.8–3 cm (0.31–1.18 in) long and 2–4 mm (0.079–0.157 in) wide, stiff, leathery, distinctly blistered on upper surface, densely woolly on the underside. The bracts are 2–3.5 mm (0.079–0.138 in) long, pedicel 2–3.5 mm (0.079–0.138 in) long with branched hairs, calyx 5 lobed, 4.5–7 mm (0.18–0.28 in) long, moderately crowded with branched hairs and a blistered surface. The scarlet, red or deep pink corolla 17–27 mm (0.67–1.06 in) long, with branched hairs in the throat, four stamens, style 13–20 mm (0.51–0.79 in) long, glandular with soft hairs on the outside, mostly smooth on the inside. The larger anterior lobe has small hairs, the two upper lobes oblong to egg-shaped, rounded at the apex, 3–6 mm (0.12–0.24 in) long, 2–5 mm (0.079–0.197 in) wide at the base. The two lower lobes oblong to egg-shaped, 4–8 mm (0.16–0.31 in) long and 3–5 mm (0.12–0.20 in) wide at the base. The floral tube almost cylindrical near the base. Flowering occurs from July to November and the fruit roughly spherical, 3–5 mm (0.12–0.20 in) long and 3–4 mm (0.12–0.16 in) in diameter and soft hairs on the surface.

== Taxonomy and naming ==
Chloanthes coccinea was first formally described in 1845 by Friedrich Gottlieb Bartling and the description was published in Plantae Preissianae. The specific epithet (coccinea) means "scarlet".

== Distribution and habitat ==
This species grows in sand and gravel on sand plains and lateritic locations north of Albany.
