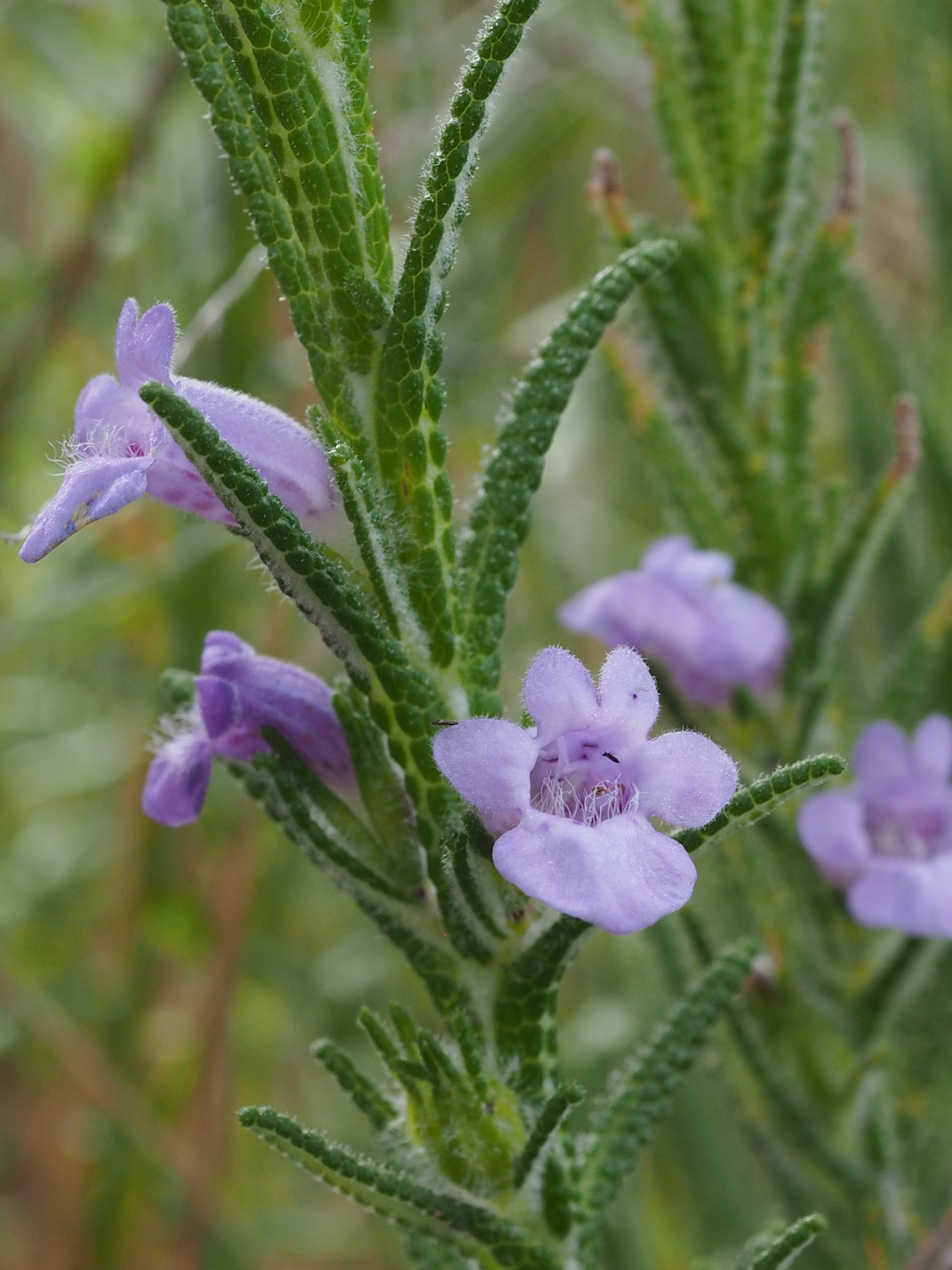

Scientific classification
- Kingdom: Plantae
- Clade: Tracheophytes
- Clade: Angiosperms
- Clade: Eudicots
- Clade: Asterids
- Order: Lamiales
- Family: Lamiaceae
- Genus: Chloanthes
- Species: C. parviflora

Binomial name
- Chloanthes parviflora Walp.

= Chloanthes parviflora =

Species of flowering plant

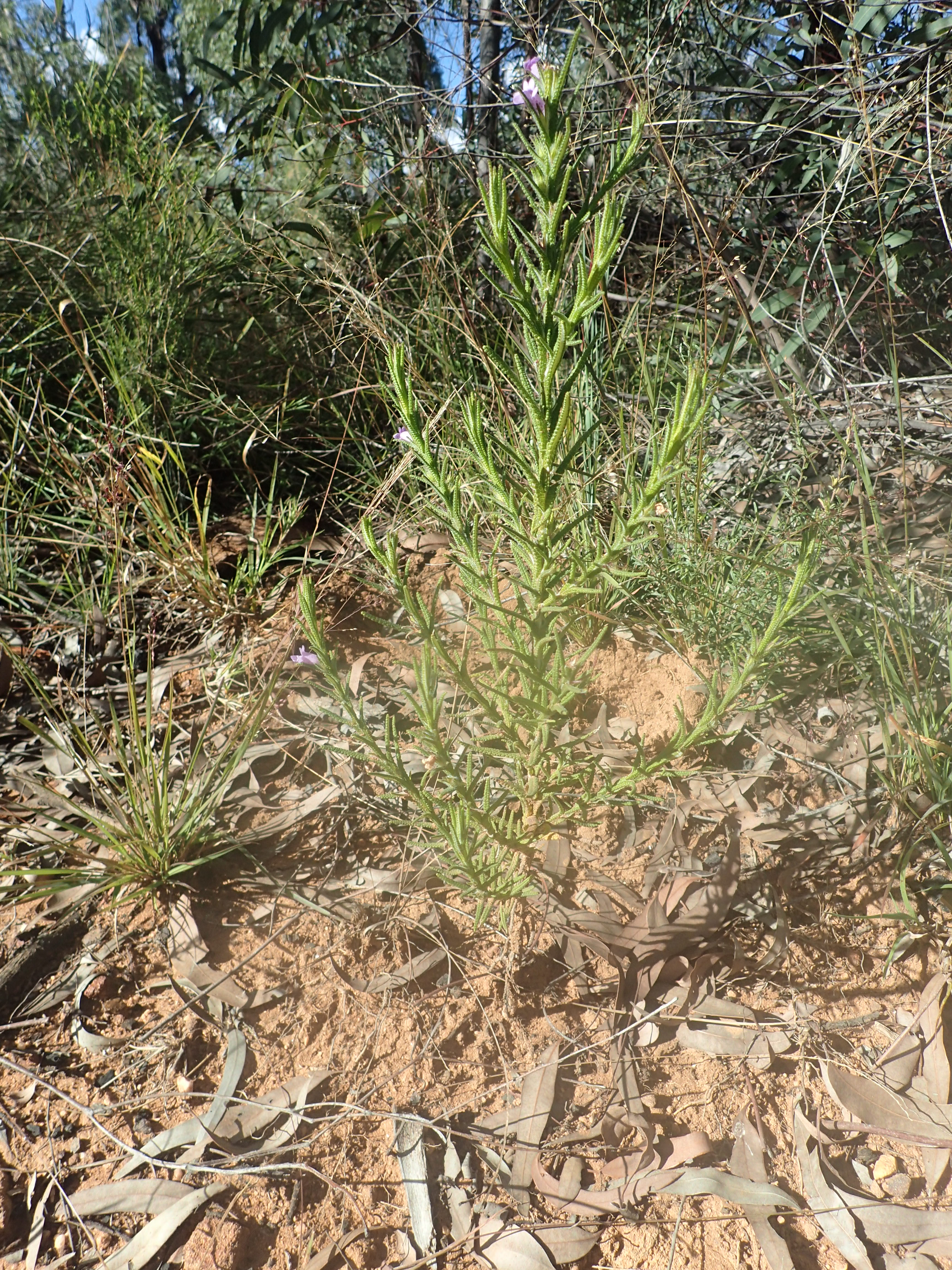
Habit near the Sandstone Caves

Chloanthes parviflora is a species of flowering plant in the family Lamiaceae. It is a small, rounded shrub with dark green, linear leaves and mauve tubular flowers. It grows in New South Wales and Queensland.

== Description ==
Chloanthes parviflora is a small, rounded shrub to 30–90 cm (12–35 in) high, leaves pressed against the stems and usually woody at the base of the plant. The leaves are pale green, rough, linear, 1–4 cm (0.39–1.57 in) long, 2–5 mm (0.079–0.197 in) wide, upper surface wrinkled, blister-like, underside white and woolly, margins rolled under. The tubular, mauve flowers are borne singly in leaf axils, 15–30 mm (0.59–1.18 in) long, purple-spotted and hairy in the tube, lower lobe larger, 8–12 mm (0.31–0.47 in) long on a pedicel mostly 1–2 mm (0.039–0.079 in) long, style about 10–15 mm (0.39–0.59 in) long. The bracts are leaf-like, sessile, linear or linear-lance shaped, rolled edges, 1–2.3 cm (0.39–0.91 in) long, 1.5–3 mm (0.059–0.118 in) wide, upper surface wrinkled, underneath woolly, smooth, slightly warty or with small, hard protuberances. The smaller bracts sessile, linear or needle-shaped, 5–10 mm (0.20–0.39 in) long, about 1 mm (0.039 in) wide, wrinkled and smooth on upper surface, woolly on the underside. The calyx has 5 lobes, linear to linear-oblong shaped, smooth and glandular on the outer surface, smooth on the inside, 7–10 mm (0.28–0.39 in) long, 1.5–2 mm (0.059–0.079 in) wide at the base. Flowering occurs from June to November but mostly in spring and the fruit is usually oblong to obovate, dry, somewhat compressed, 0.5 cm (0.20 in) in diameter and notched at the apex.

== Taxonomy and naming ==
Chloanthes parviflora was first formally described in 1845 by Wilhelm Gerhard Walpers and the description was published in Repertorium Botanices Systematicae. The specific epithet (parvilflora) means "small flowered".

== Distribution and habitat ==
This species grows in sandy to gravelly soils in heath and sclerophyll forest. In New South Wales it grows from north of Cooma to Grafton, Coffs Harbour and the Pilliga Scrub. In the south of the state between Braidwood and Nerriga. In Queensland it is found mostly in the eastern and south-eastern locations, including Jericho, Blackdown, and Brisbane, near Rockhampton and Toowoomba.
