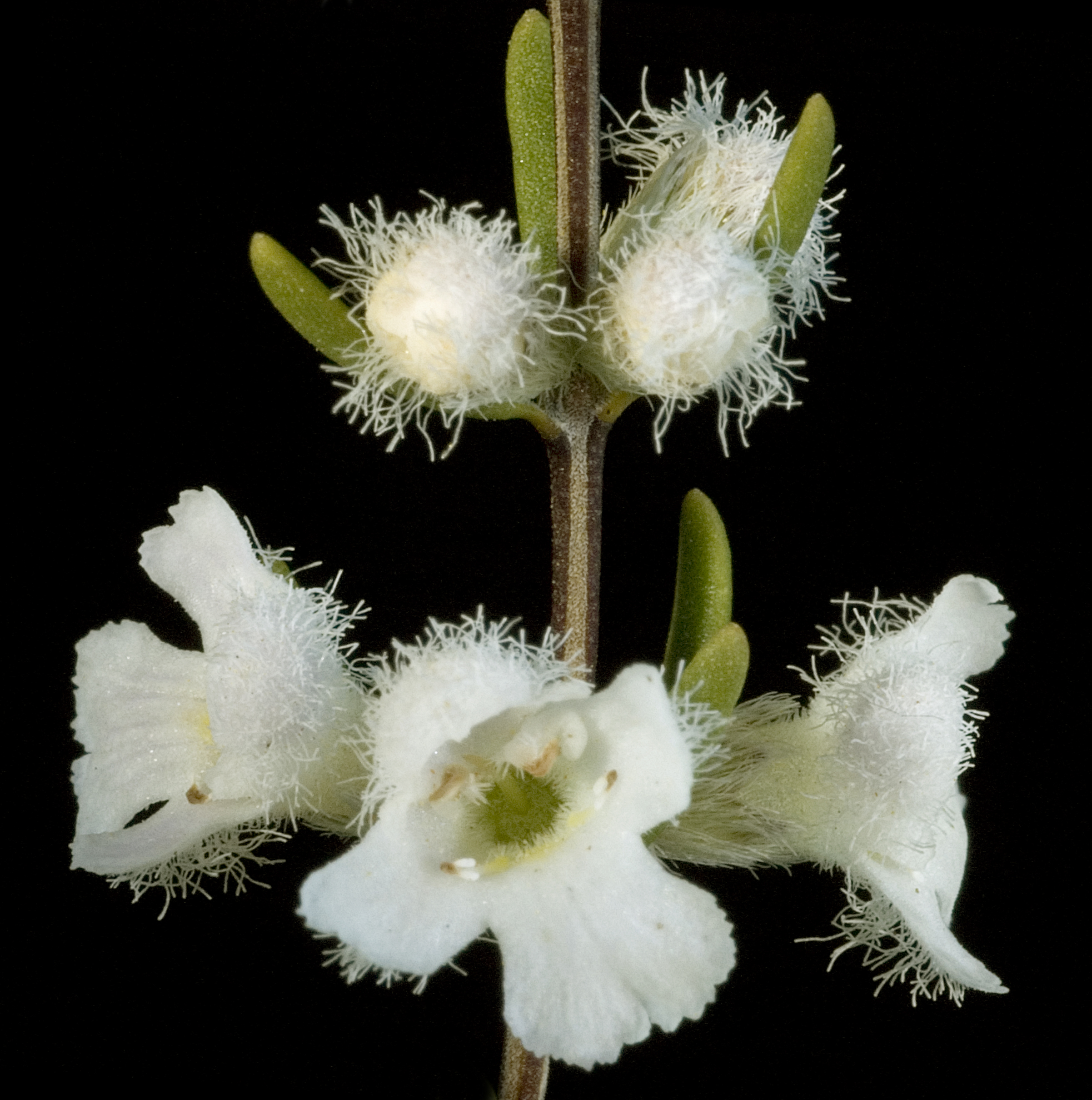

Scientific classification
- Kingdom: Plantae
- Clade: Tracheophytes
- Clade: Angiosperms
- Clade: Eudicots
- Clade: Asterids
- Order: Lamiales
- Family: Lamiaceae
- Genus: Microcorys
- Species: M. barbata

Binomial name
- Microcorys barbata R.Br.
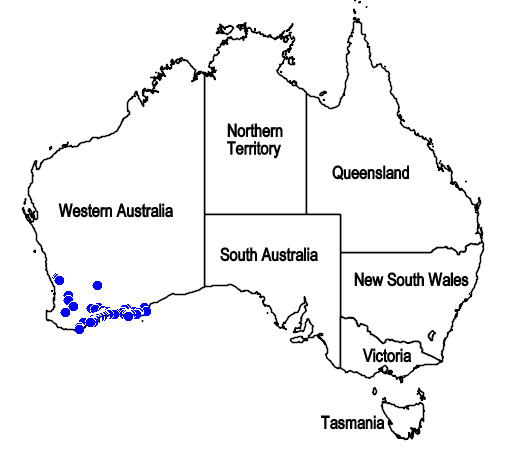

= Microcorys barbata =

Species of plant

Microcorys barbata is a plant in the Lamiaceae family, native to Western Australia. It was first described by Robert Brown in 1810.
