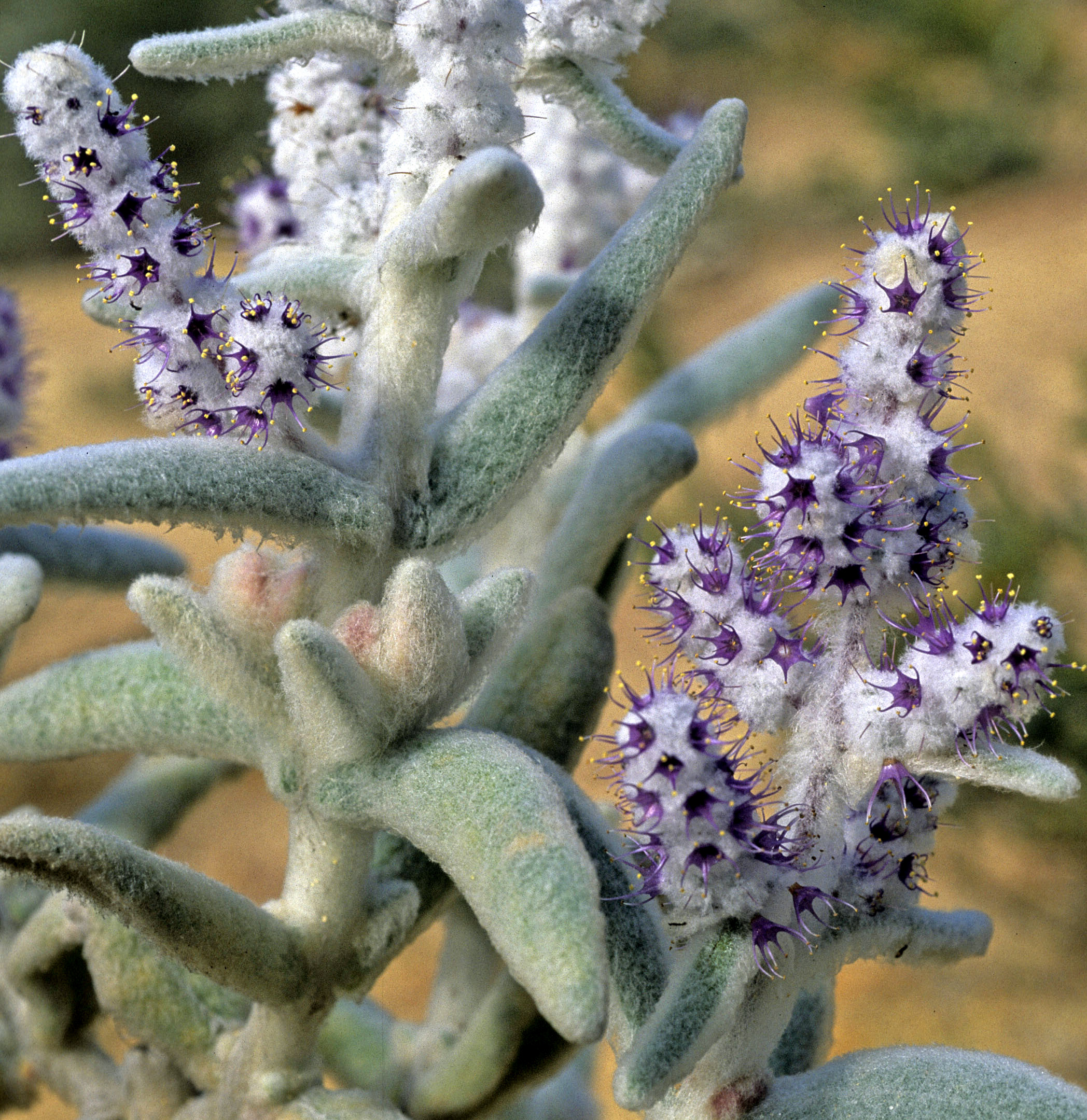

Scientific classification
- Kingdom: Plantae
- Clade: Tracheophytes
- Clade: Angiosperms
- Clade: Eudicots
- Clade: Asterids
- Order: Lamiales
- Family: Lamiaceae
- Genus: Lachnostachys
- Species: L. verbascifolia

Binomial name
- Lachnostachys verbascifolia F.Muell.
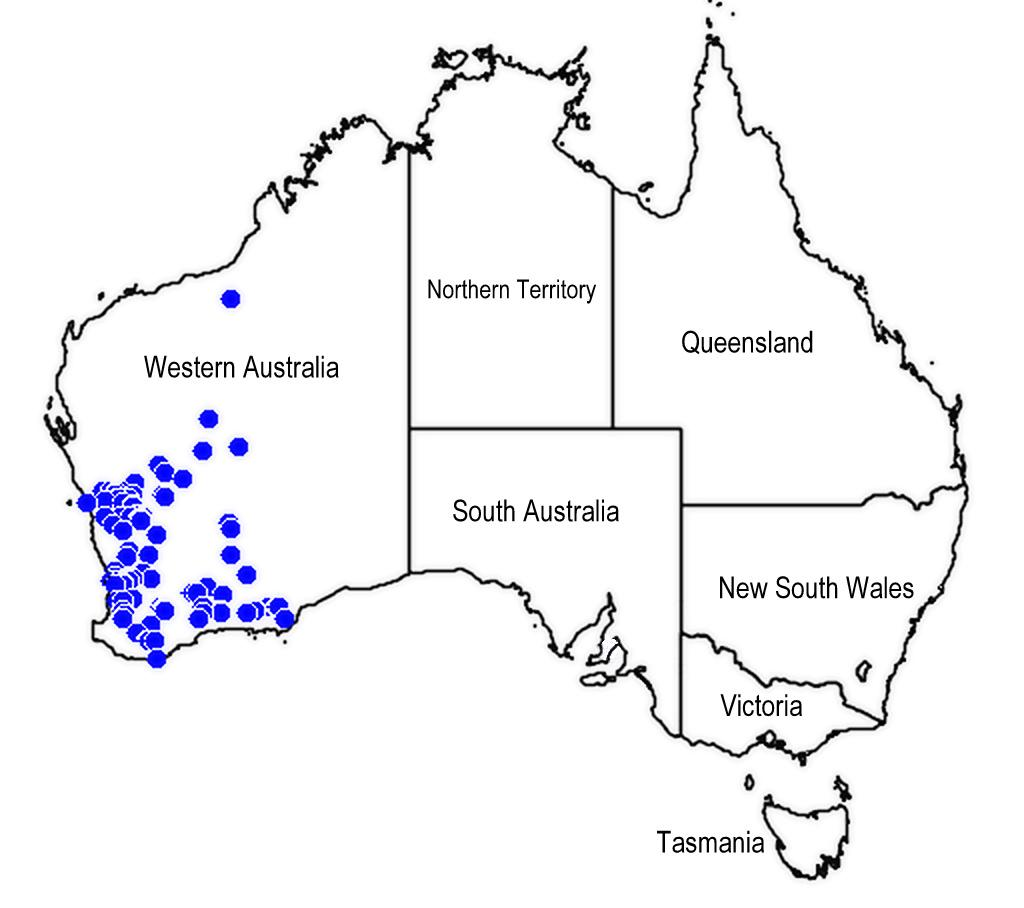

= Lachnostachys verbascifolia =

Species of flowering plant

Lachnostachys verbascifolia is a plant in the Lamiaceae family, endemic to Western Australia.

== Description ==
Lachnostachys verbascifolia is a shrub growing from 0.3 to 1.3 m high. Its leaves are obtuse and its bracts are covered in white. Its flowers are purple to white, with flowering occurring from June to November.

== Distribution ==
It is found in the IBRA regions of: the Avon Wheatbelt, the Jarrah Forest, and the Murchison bioregion, on sandy soils in shrublands and woodlands.

== Taxonomy ==
Lachnostachys verbascifolia was first described in 1868 by Ferdinand von Mueller from a specimen, K000975361, found by James Drummond in Western Australia.

== Gallery ==
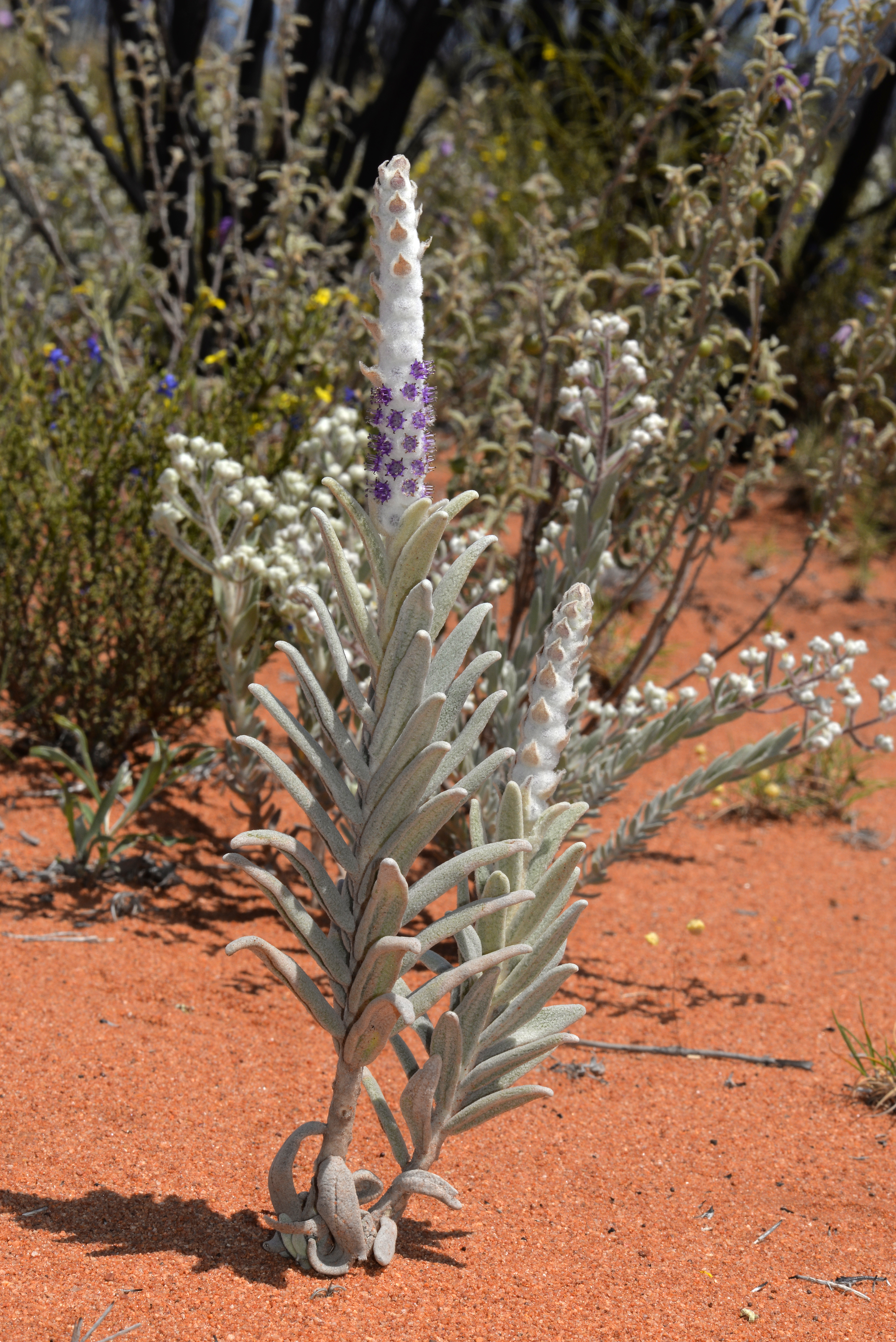

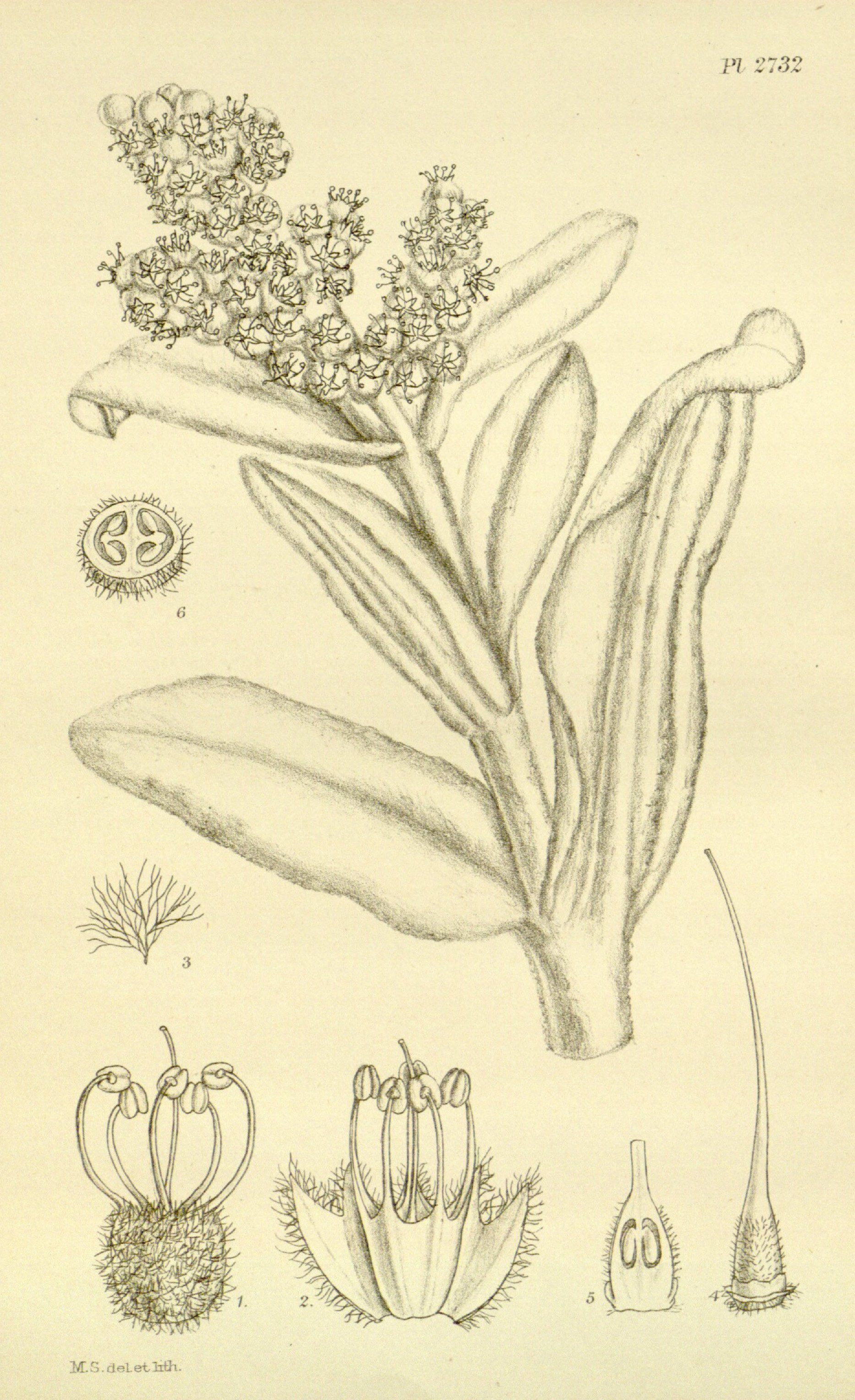

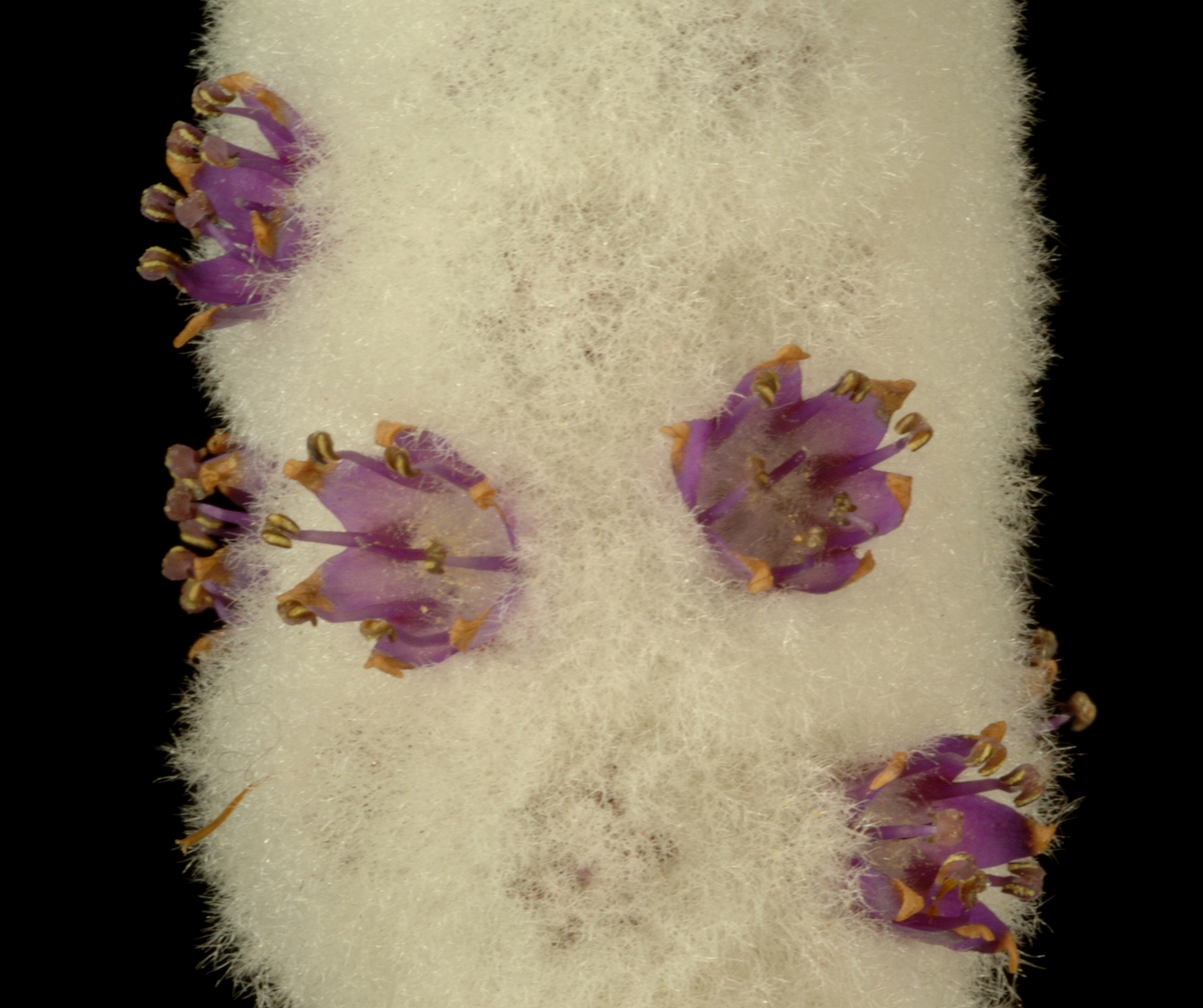

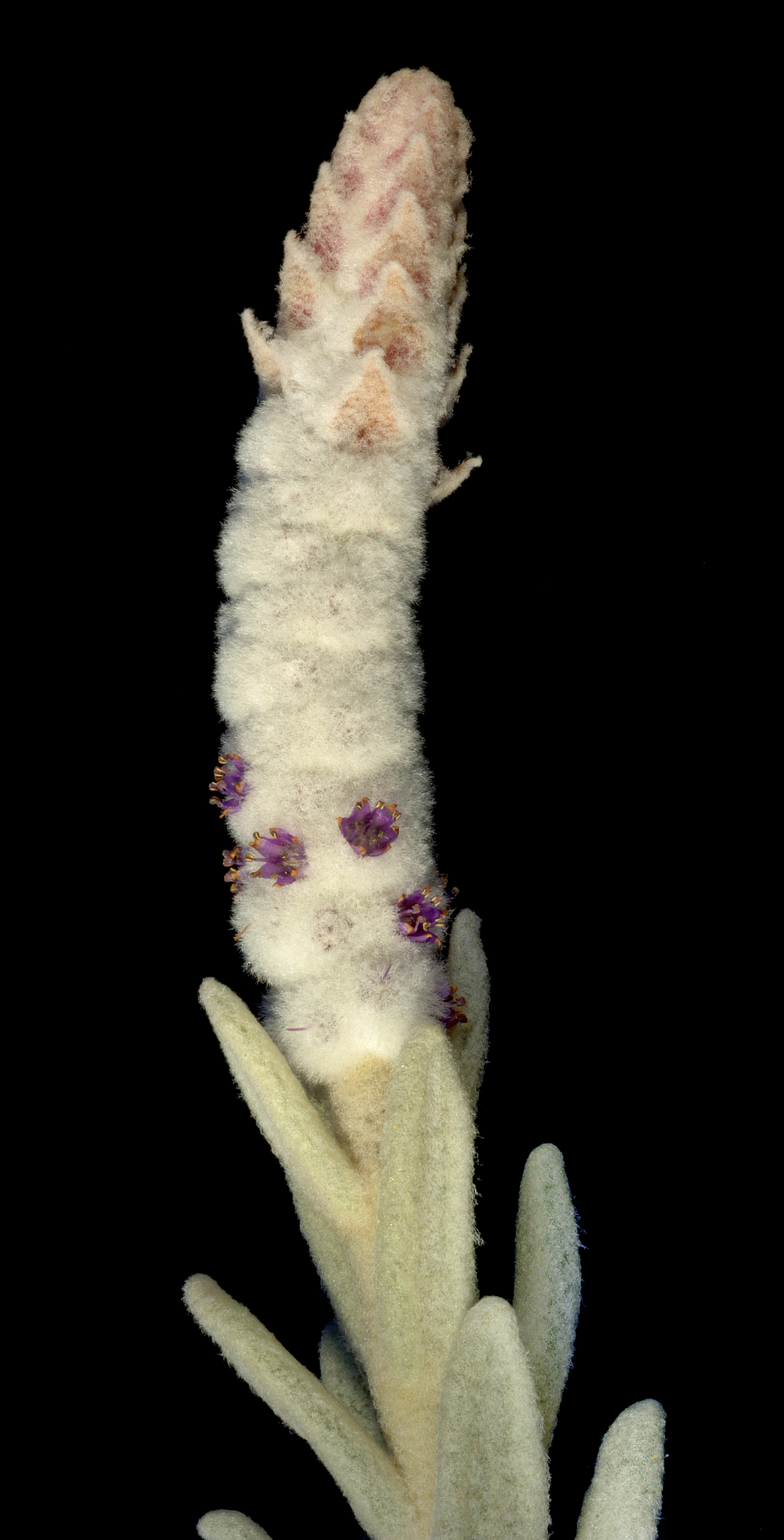

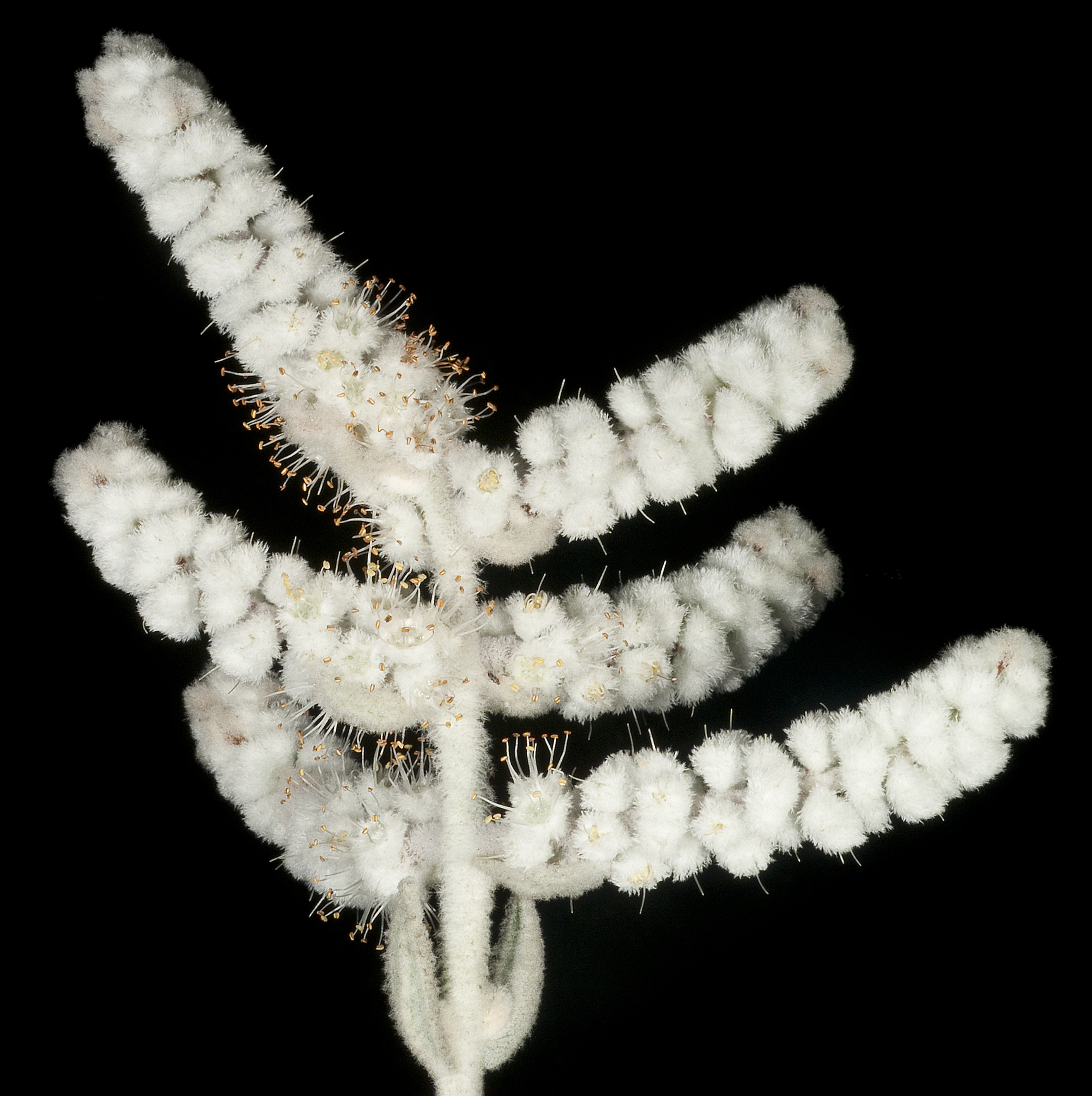
