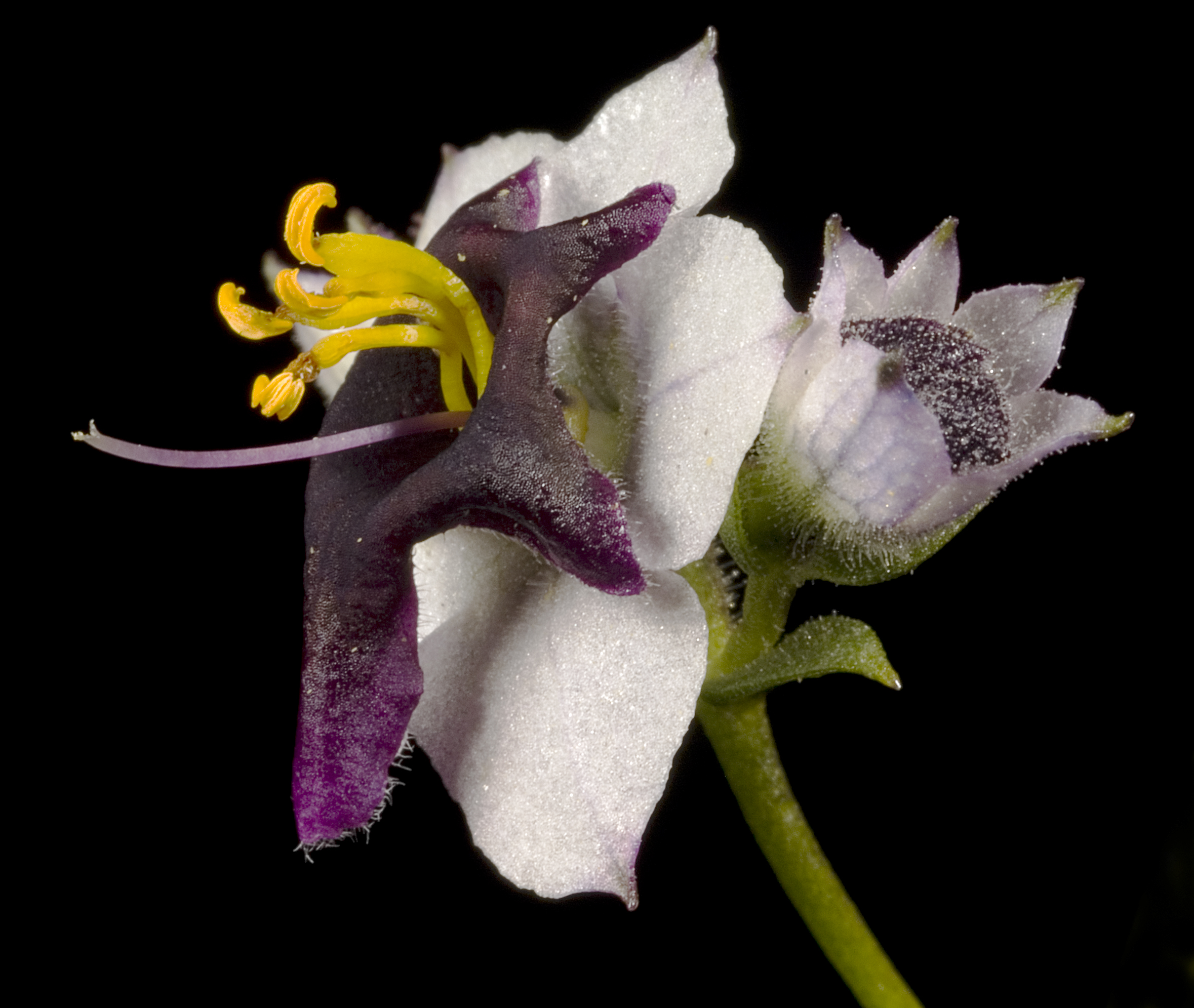
- Cyanostegia lanceolata

Scientific classification
- Kingdom: Plantae
- Clade: Tracheophytes
- Clade: Angiosperms
- Clade: Eudicots
- Clade: Asterids
- Order: Lamiales
- Family: Lamiaceae
- Subfamily: Prostantheroideae
- Genus: Cyanostegia; Turcz.

Synonyms
- Bunnya F.Muell.

= Cyanostegia =

Genus of flowering plants

Cyanostegia is a genus of flowering plants in the family Lamiaceae, that was errcted in 1849. The entire genus is endemic to Australia.

Species

- Cyanostegia angustifolia Turcz. - Western Australia
- Cyanostegia corifolia Munir - Western Australia
- Cyanostegia cyanocalyx (F.Muell.) C.A.Gardner - northern Western Australia, southern Northern Territory
- Cyanostegia lanceolata Turcz. - Western Australia
- Cyanostegia microphylla S.Moore - Western Australia
