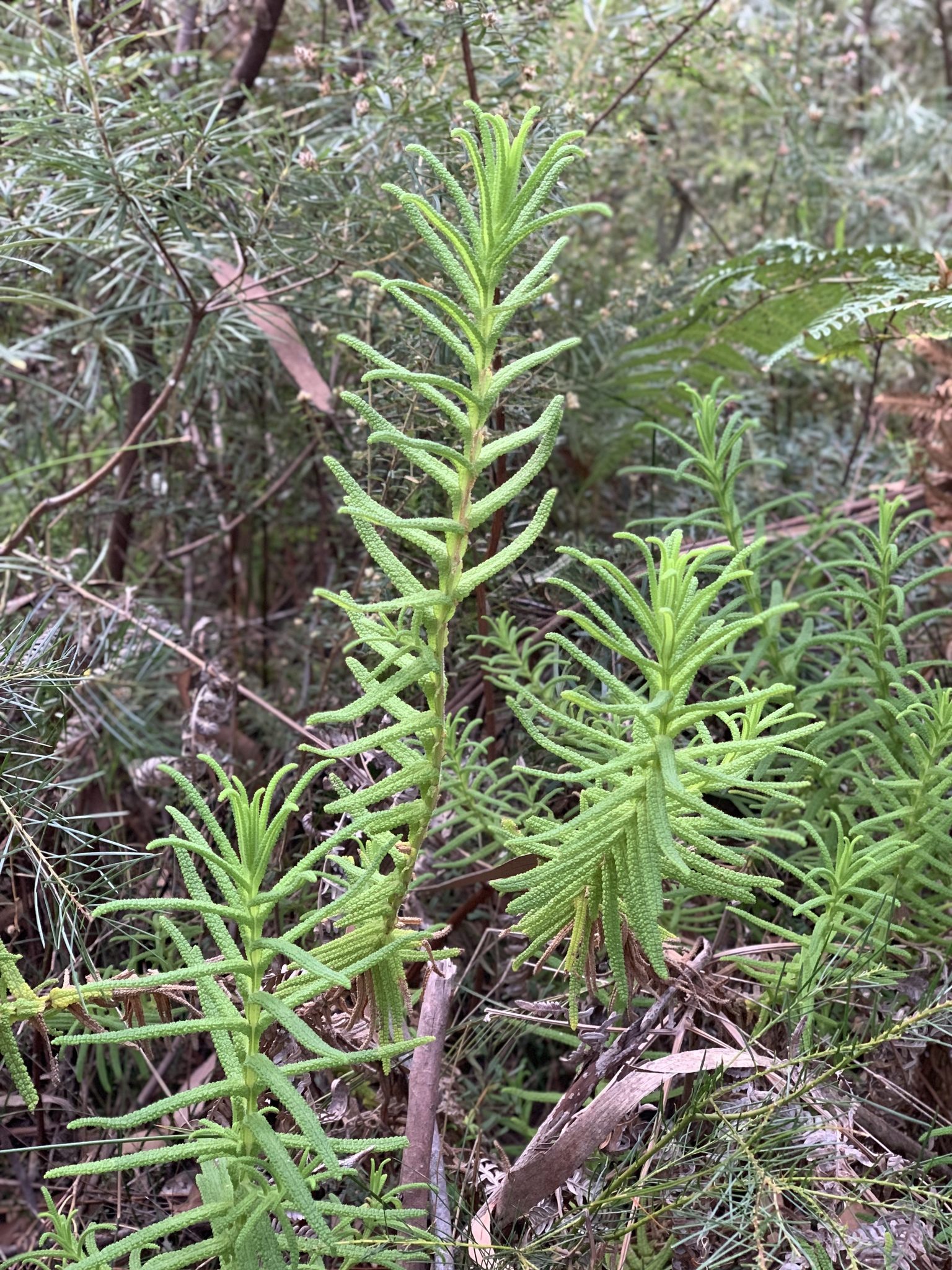

Scientific classification
- Kingdom: Plantae
- Clade: Tracheophytes
- Clade: Angiosperms
- Clade: Eudicots
- Clade: Asterids
- Order: Lamiales
- Family: Lamiaceae
- Genus: Chloanthes
- Species: C. glandulosa

Binomial name
- Chloanthes glandulosa R.Br.

= Chloanthes glandulosa =

Species of flowering plant

Chloanthes glandulosa is a species of flowering plant in the family Lamiaceae. It is a small shrub with wrinkled leaves and greenish-yellow tubular flowers. It is endemic to New South Wales.

== Description ==
Chloanthes glandulosa is a small shrub to 30–90 cm (12–35 in) high with narrow egg-shaped to more or less linear leaves, 3.5–8 cm (1.4–3.1 in) long and 4–11 mm (0.16–0.43 in) wide. The leaf edges are minutely curved under, upper and lower surfaces have short, rigid bristles, upper surface wrinkled, lower surface with prominent veins. The greenish-yellow flowers are on a pedicel 4–7 mm (0.16–0.28 in) long, glandular and covered with short, soft hairs. The calyx 15–20 mm (0.59–0.79 in) long, glandular with soft hairs on the outside and with a few scattered hairs on inner side toward apex. The lobes are narrowly egg-shaped, more or less scalloped with curved edges. The corolla 35–50 mm (1.4–2.0 in) long, tubular, greenish-yellow and a style 35–45 mm (1.4–1.8 in) long, protruding beyond the flower tube. Flowering occurs from July to November and the fruit is a dry drupe more or less elliptic-obovate shaped and 5–6 mm (0.20–0.24 in) long.

== Taxonomy and naming ==
Chloanthes glandulosa was first formally described in 1810 by Robert Brown and the description was published in Prodromus florae Novae Hollandiae et insulae Van-Diemen, exhibens characteres plantarum quas annis 1802-1805. The specific epithet (glandulosa) means "gland bearing".

== Distribution and habitat ==
This species grows in moist, mostly sandy soils in sclerophyll forests in the Blue Mountains from Springwood to Kurrajong.
