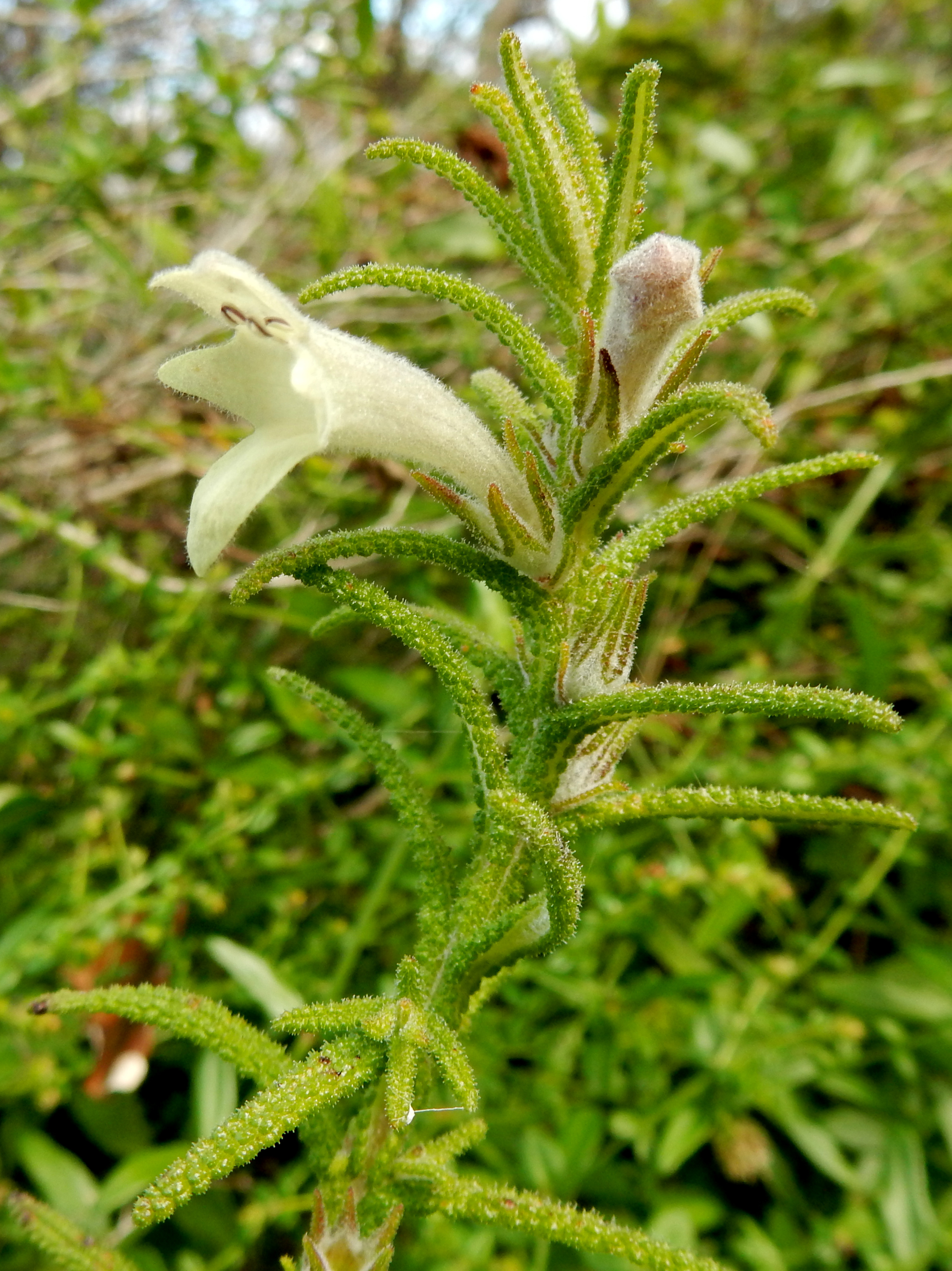
- at Dee Why, Australia

Scientific classification
- Kingdom: Plantae
- Clade: Tracheophytes
- Clade: Angiosperms
- Clade: Eudicots
- Clade: Asterids
- Order: Lamiales
- Family: Lamiaceae
- Genus: Chloanthes
- Species: C. stoechadis

Binomial name
- Chloanthes stoechadis R.Br.

= Chloanthes stoechadis =

Species of flowering plant

Chloanthes stoechadis is a species of flowering plant in the family Lamiaceae. It is a small under shrub with wrinkled leaves and yellowish green flowers.

== Description ==
Chloanthes stoechadis is a small, branched under shrub that usually grows to 30–90 cm (12–35 in) high with white woolly stems. The leaves are arranged opposite, more or less linear, mostly 0.5–5 cm (0.20–1.97 in) long, roughly wrinkled above, white woolly underneath, dull green, and margins rolled under. The corolla are yellowish green or greenish blue, borne singly in upper leaf axils, tubular to 4 cm (1.6 in) long, mostly hairy inside, pedicel 1–4 mm (0.039–0.157 in) long or almost non-existent. The lower lobe longer, 6–13 mm (0.24–0.51 in) long and 3.5–8 mm (0.14–0.31 in) wide at the base, the style 18–45 mm (0.71–1.77 in) long and stamens both protruding beyond the floral tube. The calyx lobes narrowly oval-shaped, blistered with margins curved or rolled under. The bracts leaf-like, sessile, linear to lance-shaped, 8–17 mm (0.31–0.67 in) long and 1.5–3 m (4 ft 11 in – 9 ft 10 in) wide, wrinkled and blistered on upper surface, woolly underneath, somewhat rough with short, hard protuberances. Flowering occurs usually from July to October, followed by dry, hemispherical fruit.

== Taxonomy and naming ==
Chloanthes stoechadis was first formally described in 1810 by Robert Brown and description was published in Prodromus florae Novae Hollandiae et insulae Van-Diemen, exhibens characteres plantarum quas annis 1802-1805. The specific epithet (stoechadis) refers to its similarity to "lavender" leaves.

== Distribution and habitat ==
This species usually grows near rocky outcrops, on poor sandy soils in woodland, sclerophyll forest and heath north of Jervis Bay in New South Wales. A rare species in Western Australia, also found in scattered locations in Queensland.
