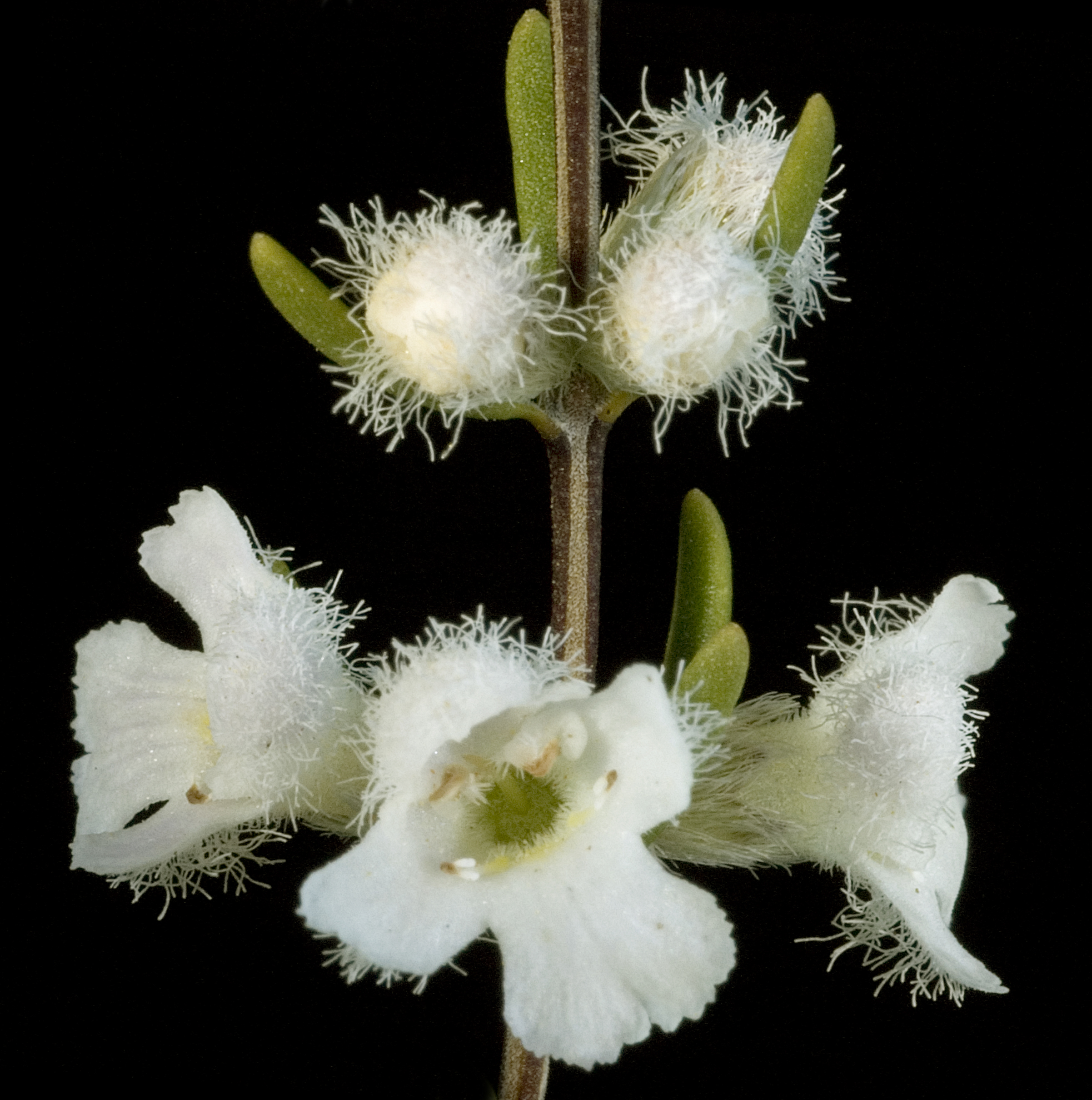
- Microcorys barbata

Scientific classification
- Kingdom: Plantae
- Clade: Tracheophytes
- Clade: Angiosperms
- Clade: Eudicots
- Clade: Asterids
- Order: Lamiales
- Family: Lamiaceae
- Subfamily: Prostantheroideae
- Genus: Microcorys; R.Br.

Synonyms
- Anisandra Bartl.

= Microcorys =

Genus of flowering plants

Microcorys is a genus of flowering plants in the family Lamiaceae, first described in 1810. The entire genus is endemic to Australia.

== Species ==
The following species are recognised in the genus Microcorys:

- Microcorys barbata R.Br. - Western Australia
- Microcorys capitata (Bartl.) Benth. - Western Australia
- Microcorys cephalantha B.J.Conn - Western Australia
- Microcorys elatoides T.C.Wilson & Hislop - Western Australia
- Microcorys elliptica B.J.Conn - Northern Territory
- Microcorys eremophiloides Kenneally - Western Australia
- Microcorys ericifolia Benth. - Western Australia
- Microcorys exserta Benth. - Western Australia
- Microcorys glabra (Bartl.) Benth. - Western Australia
- Microcorys lenticularis F.Muell. - Western Australia
- Microcorys longiflora F.Muell. - Western Australia
- Microcorys longifolia (Benth.) Benth. - Western Australia
- Microcorys macredieana F.Muell. - Northern Territory
- Microcorys obovata Benth. - Western Australia
- Microcorys pimeloides F.Muell. - Western Australia
- Microcorys purpurea R.Br. - Western Australia
- Microcorys queenslandica C.T.White - Queensland
- Microcorys subcanescens Benth. - Western Australia
- Microcorys tenuifolia Benth. - Western Australia
- Microcorys virgata R.Br. - Western Australia
- Microcorys wilsoniana B.J.Conn - Western Australia
