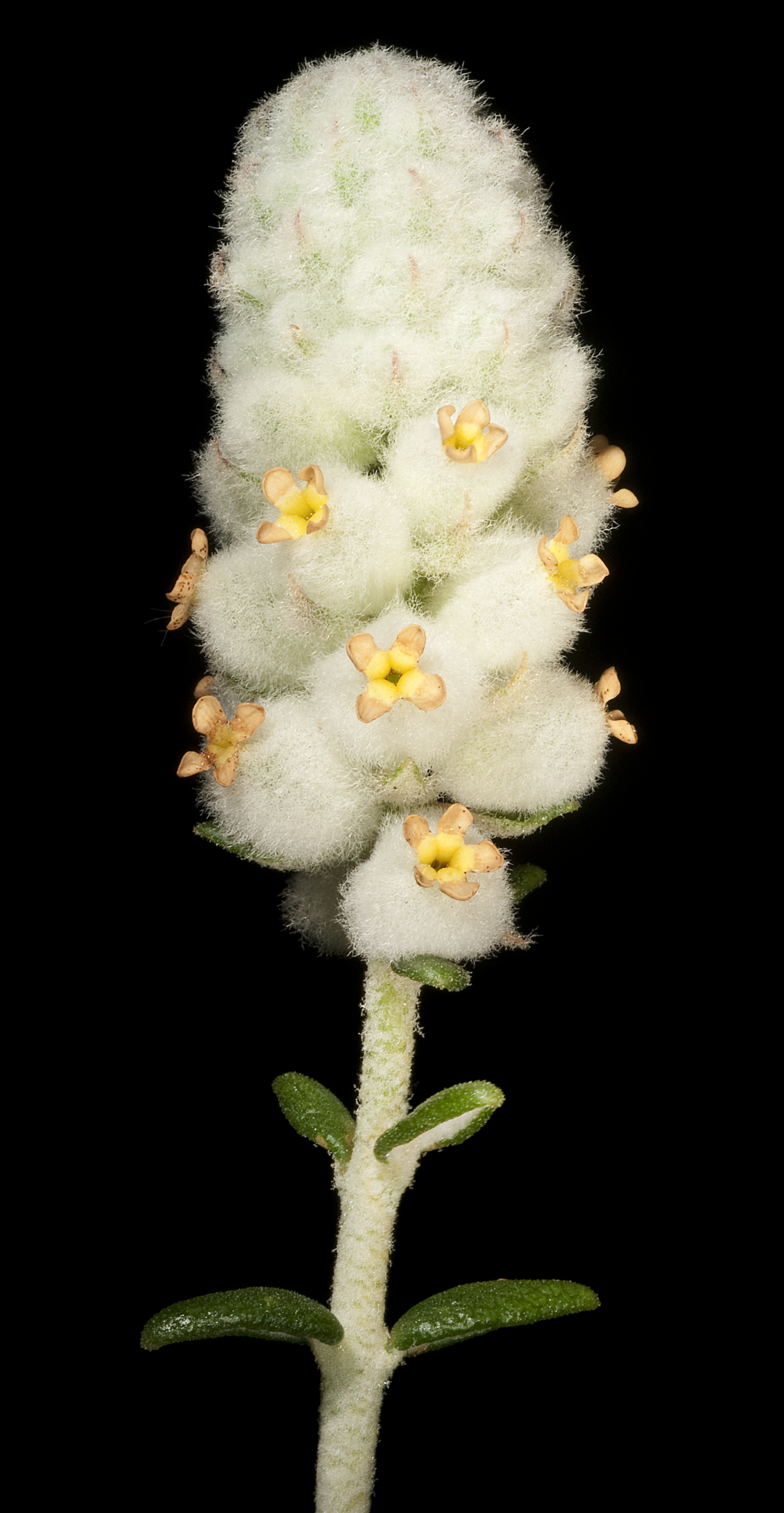
- Physopsis spicata

Scientific classification
- Kingdom: Plantae
- Clade: Tracheophytes
- Clade: Angiosperms
- Clade: Eudicots
- Clade: Asterids
- Order: Lamiales
- Family: Lamiaceae
- Subfamily: Prostantheroideae
- Genus: Physopsis; Turcz.

= Physopsis =

Genus of flowering plants

Physopsis is a genus of plants in the mint family, Lamiaceae, first described in 1849. The entire genus is endemic to the State of Western Australia.

Species

- Physopsis chrysophylla (C.A.Gardner) Rye
- Physopsis chrysotricha (F.Muell.) Rye
- Physopsis lachnostachya C.A.Gardner
- Physopsis spicata Turcz.
- Physopsis viscida (E.Pritz.) Rye
