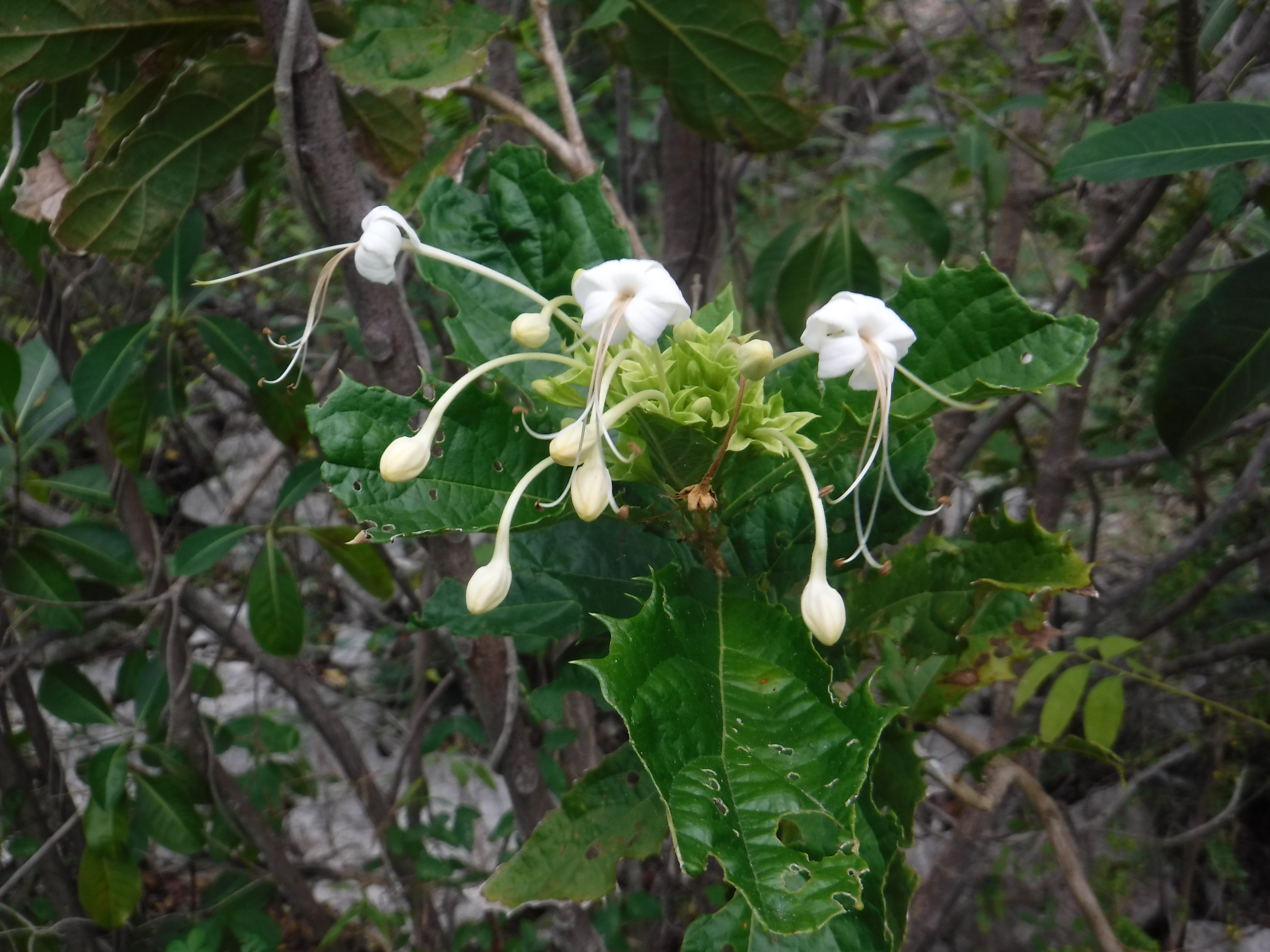
- Ovieda spinosa in Haiti in the wild

Scientific classification
- Kingdom: Plantae
- Clade: Tracheophytes
- Clade: Angiosperms
- Clade: Eudicots
- Clade: Asterids
- Order: Lamiales
- Family: Lamiaceae
- Genus: Ovieda
- Species: O. spinosa

Binomial name
- Ovieda spinosa L.

Synonyms
- Clerodendrum spinosum (L.) Spreng

= Ovieda spinosa =

Genus of flowering plants

Ovieda spinosa is a species of flowering plant in the family Lamiaceae, first described for modern science in 1753. The species is endemic to the Island of Hispaniola in the West Indies.
