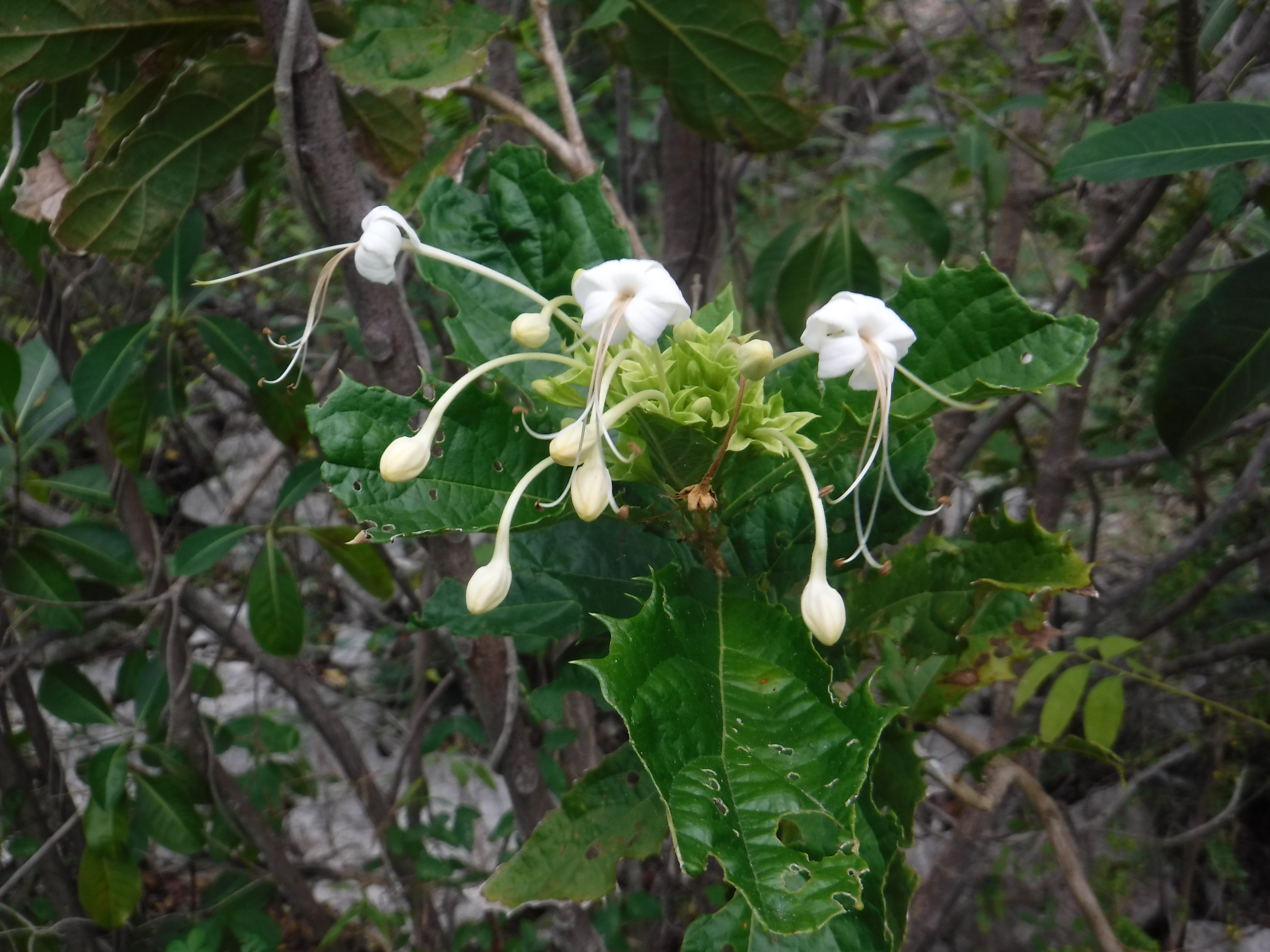
- Ovieda spinosa in Haiti in the wild

Scientific classification
- Kingdom: Plantae
- Clade: Tracheophytes
- Clade: Angiosperms
- Clade: Eudicots
- Clade: Asterids
- Order: Lamiales
- Family: Lamiaceae
- Subfamily: Ajugoideae
- Genus: Ovieda; L.

= Ovieda =

Genus of flowering plants

Ovieda is a genus of flowering plant in the family Lamiaceae, first described for modern science in 1753. It contains several accepted species, all endemic to the islands of Cuba and Hispaniola in the West Indies.

== Species ==
As of September 2025, Plants of the World Online accepted the following species:

- Ovieda anafensis (Britton & P.Wilson) I.E.Méndez, endemic to Cuba
- Ovieda brachypus (Urb.) I.E.Méndez, endemic to Cuba
- Ovieda calcicola (Britton) I.E.Méndez, endemic to Cuba
- Ovieda cubensis (Schauer) I.E.Méndez, endemic to Cuba
- Ovieda grandiflora (Hook.) I.E.Méndez, endemic to Cuba
- Ovieda picardae (Urb.) I.E.Méndez, endemic to Hispaniola
- Ovieda spinosa L., endemic to Hispaniola
- Ovieda tuberculata (A.Rich.) I.E.Méndez, endemic to Cuba
