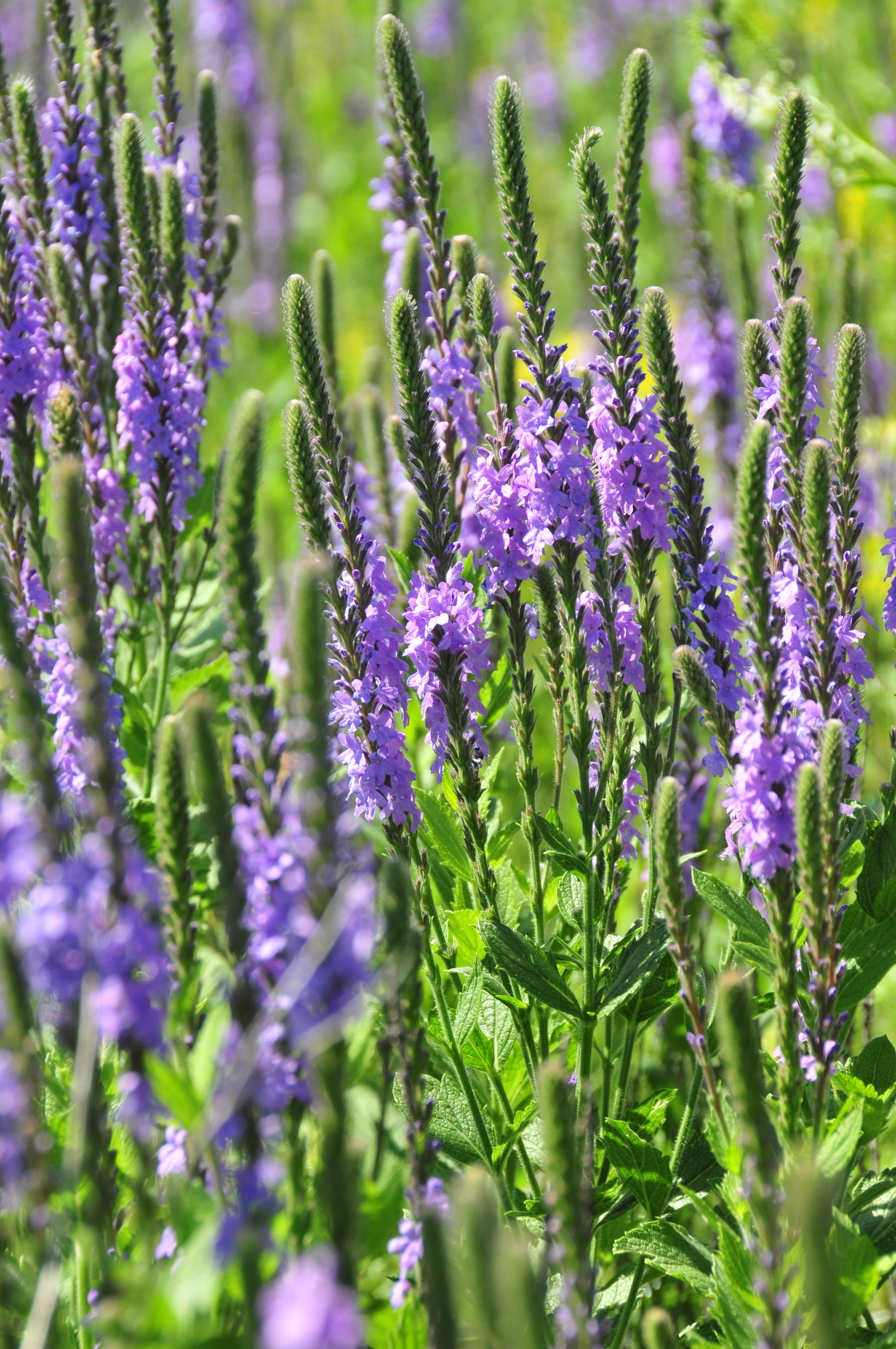
- Hoary vervain on a mixed-grass prairie of Lacreek NWR

Scientific classification
- Kingdom: Plantae
- Clade: Tracheophytes
- Clade: Angiosperms
- Clade: Eudicots
- Clade: Asterids
- Order: Lamiales
- Family: Verbenaceae
- Genus: Verbena
- Species: V. stricta

Binomial name
- Verbena stricta Vent.

= Verbena stricta =

Species of flowering plant

Verbena stricta, also known as hoary verbena, hoary vervain, tall vervain, or woolly verbena, is a North American wildflower. It was first described by Étienne Pierre Ventenat in his work, Description des plantes nouvelles.

== Distribution and habitat ==
V. stricta is native to the contiguous United States, Quebec, and Ontario. It is a drought-resistant species that prefers dry, well-drained soils and ample sunlight. It is mostly found in low fields, meadows, prairies, and along roadsides and other disturbed habitats.

== Description ==
In ideal growing conditions, V. stricta can grow up to 2–4 feet (0.6–1.2 m). It blooms for six weeks from June to September.

=== Flower ===
The inflorescence is made up of a densely clustered panicle of purple-blue or pink flowers along a hairy spike that may range from 1 to 8 inches long. However, a mutation that causes lessened amounts of delphinidin and the complete loss of petunidin and malvidin produces white flowers. Flowers are not all open at the same time. Each flower is zygomorphic, consisting of a short corolla, four stamens, a small, toothed calyx, and five petals with a fused base, forming a slight tubular shape. The petal lobes are unequal in size and length, with the two lateral lobes being slightly larger, and the bottom lobe bearing a small notch.

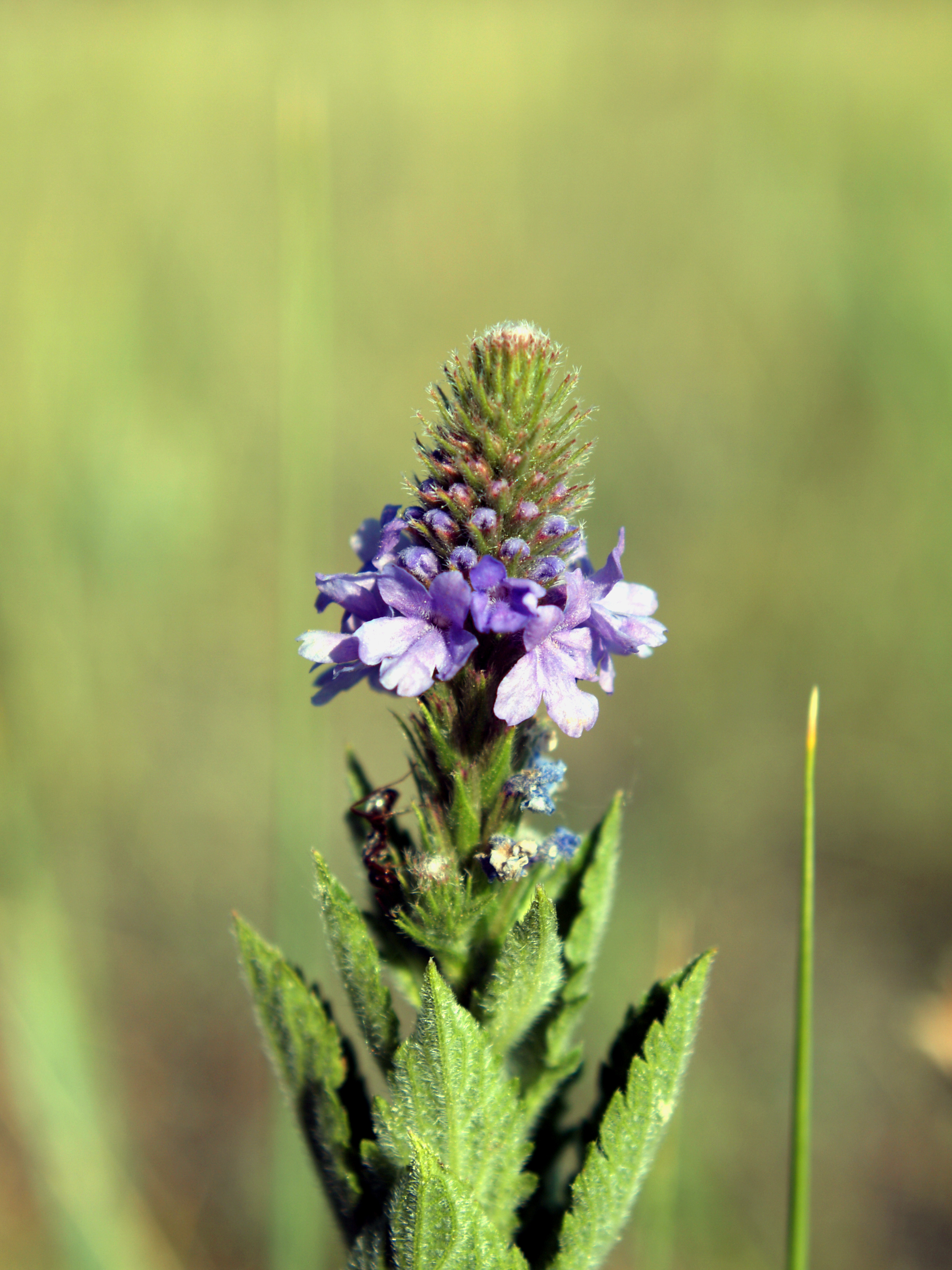
V. stricta inflorescence at top of spike.

=== Leaves ===
The leaves are green in color and grow in an opposite arrangement along the side of the plant. Their edges are heavily serrate, and the shape is oval to obovate with a pointed tip. The stem and leaves of this plant are pubescent and may appear silvery-gray due to the density of the white hair that covers them, especially along the underside. Leaves lack a petiole.

=== Fruit ===
As the plant ages, the spike atop the plant will elongate. It will eventually seed and encapsulate four tiny nuts per flower. These fruit are usually 0.08–0.12 inches (2–3 mm) in length when ripe.

== Biology ==
Verbena stricta is facultatively xenogamous: it can self-seed, but often cross-pollinates with V. hastata and V. urticifolia. Hybrids are common among this species, giving rise to the Verbena stricta complex.

V. stricta is also of significance as a pollinator flower. In the southeast, is a host plant for the common buckeye butterfly and is frequently visited by many long-tongued bees. A specialist associated with this genus is the Nebraska vervain calliopsis bee. Its foliage is commonly eaten by grasshoppers and the seeds are eaten by songbirds.

== Cultivation ==
V. stricta is prized as an ornamental plant due to its showy inflorescence and low maintenance, but it may also be considered a weed.

Some sources purport that V. stricta may have medical benefits, but these claims are not scientifically backed. It gained the folk moniker of "feverweed" for its use against fever in the 1800s.
