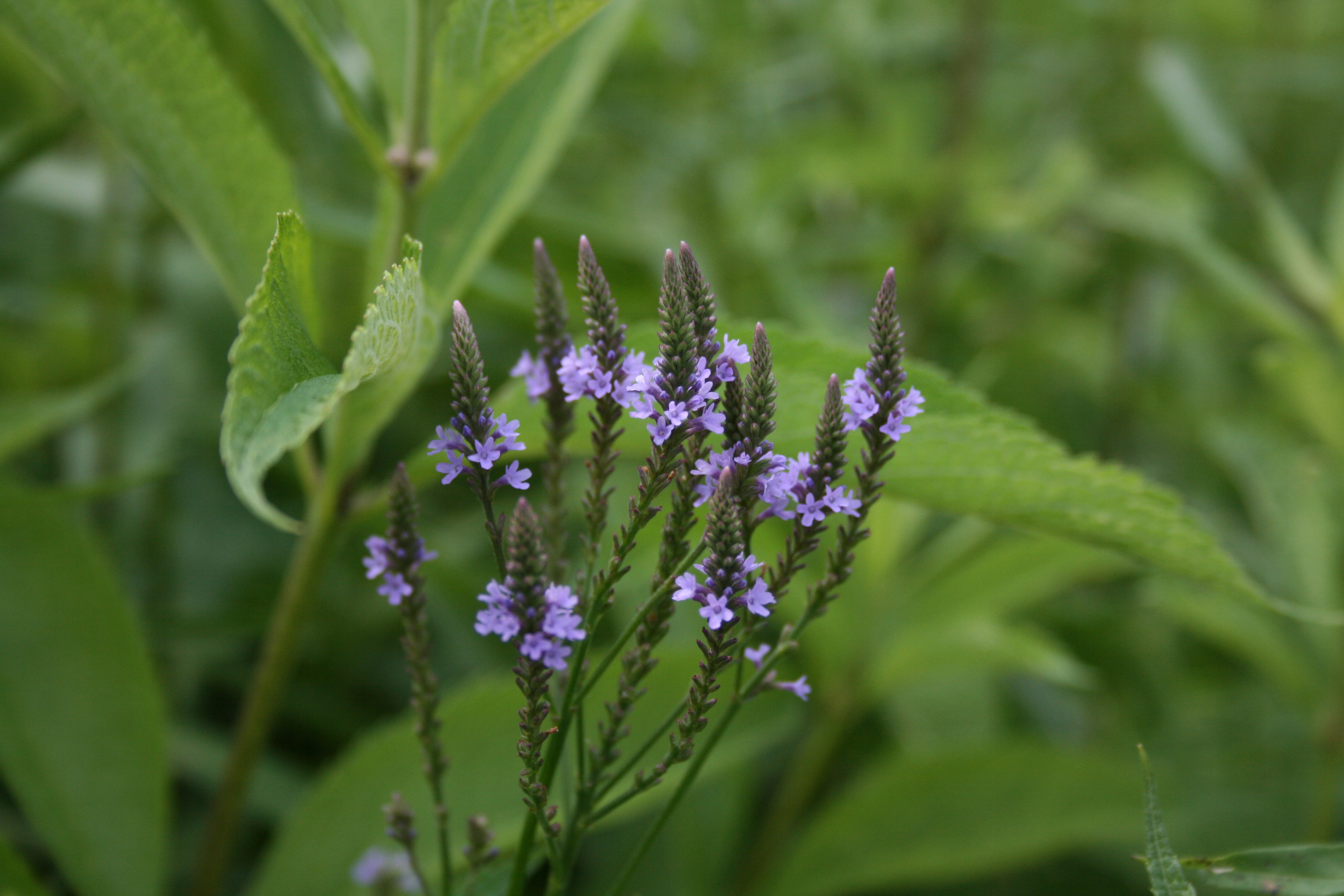

Conservation status
- Secure (NatureServe)

Scientific classification
- Kingdom: Plantae
- Clade: Tracheophytes
- Clade: Angiosperms
- Clade: Eudicots
- Clade: Asterids
- Order: Lamiales
- Family: Verbenaceae
- Genus: Verbena
- Species: V. hastata

Binomial name
- Verbena hastata L.

= Verbena hastata =

Species of flowering plant

Verbena hastata, commonly known as American vervain, blue vervain, simpler's joy, or swamp verbena, is a perennial species of flowering plant in the vervain family, Verbenaceae. It forms stems up to 1.5 metres (5 feet) tall, topped by spikes of purplish flowers. It grows throughout the continental United States and in much of southern Canada in wet conditions.

== Description ==
V. hastata is a perennial species that grows as a stiffly erect stem, occasionally branching in the upper half, reaching up to 1.5 metres (5 feet) tall. The stems are four-angled (square), hairy, and green to reddish in color. The leaves are opposite, simple, and measure up to 15 centimetres (6 inches) long and 3 cm (1 in) across. They have doubly-serrate margins and a variety of shapes, from lanceolate to ovate, and may have two lateral lobes.

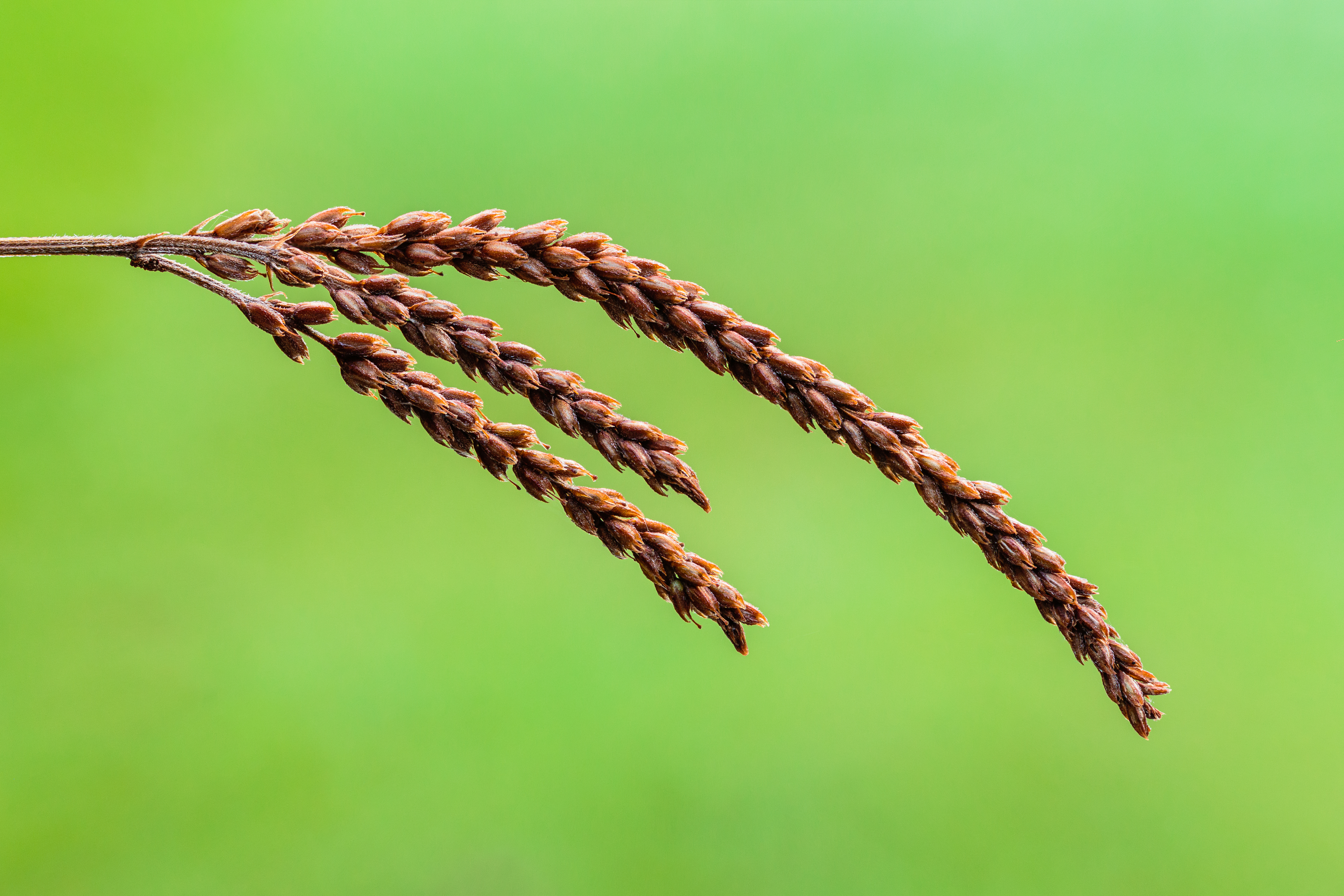
Seed formation

The bloom period is from mid- to late summer. The inflorescence is a panicle, or group, of flowering spikes, up to 30 cm (1 ft) long at the end of the upper stems. Each flowering spike in the panicle is up to 13 cm (5 in) long, with densely packed, numerous 5-lobed flowers, which measure up to 0.75 cm (1/4 in) long. The flowers are violet or deep purple, rarely white. They open from the bottom of the spike upward, with a few flowers open at a time.

=== Chemistry ===
Verbena hastata contains lophirone C, lophirone B, verbenalin, verbascoside, luteolin, oleanolic acid, ursolic acid, and the naphthoquinone derivative 4,9-dihydroxy-α-lapachone.

== Taxonomy ==
This species is a member of the diploid North American vervains which have 14 chromosomes altogether. Hybridization seems to have played some role in its evolution, presumably between some member of a group including the white vervain (V. urticifolia), V. lasiostachys or V. menthifolia, and V. orcuttiana or a related species.

In the recent evolutionary past, there has been an incident of chloroplast transfer of one of the latter or the swamp verbena to the mock vervain Glandularia bipinnatifida which is a close relative of the genus Verbena. It is unknown by what mechanism this happened, but it is suspected that hybridization is not responsible.

== Etymology ==
The Latin specific epithet hastata means "spear-shaped".

== Distribution and habitat ==
V. hastata is native in the United States in all states except Alaska and Hawaii. In Canada, it is native in the provinces of British Columbia, Saskatchewan, Manitoba, Ontario, Quebec, New Brunswick, Nova Scotia, and Prince Edward Island.

The plant prefers moist conditions and typically grows in wet meadows, wet river bottomlands, stream banks, slough peripheries, fields and waste areas. It is adapted to wetlands and can spread to form small colonies.

== Ecology ==
The flowers attract many types of bees and other insect pollinators. Several species of birds eat the seeds, including cardinals, field sparrows, swamp sparrows, song sparrows, and slate-colored juncos.

Cottontail rabbits will sometimes eat the leaves, though most other mammalian herbivores avoid it due its bitter taste. The plant is also a larval host to the common buckeye butterfly (Junonia coenia), the verbena moth (Crambodes talidiformis), and the verbena bud moth (Endothenia hebesana).
