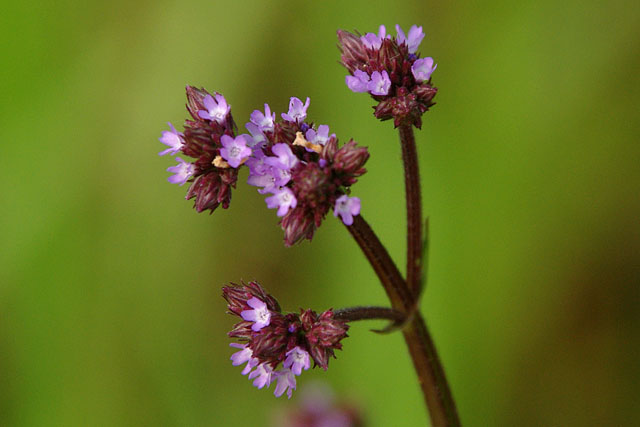
- Inflorescences with ichneumon wasp pollinator

Scientific classification
- Kingdom: Plantae
- Clade: Tracheophytes
- Clade: Angiosperms
- Clade: Eudicots
- Clade: Asterids
- Order: Lamiales
- Family: Verbenaceae
- Genus: Verbena
- Species: V. brasiliensis

Binomial name
- Verbena brasiliensis Vell.

Synonyms
- Verbena bonariensis auct. non L.

= Verbena brasiliensis =

Species of flowering plant

Verbena brasiliensis, the Brazilian verbena or Brazilian vervain, is a flowering plant species from the vervain family (Verbenaceae). It is native to parts of South America, namely Brazil, but has spread its range in recent times and has occasionally become an invasive weed. It is an annual plant with purple flowers, and it has been introduced outside of its native range as an ornamental plant, and is now largely considered an invasive weed in these regions.

In the past, several botanists have mistakenly applied the scientific name of the purpletop vervain, V. bonariensis, to this species. As a consequence, the common names "Brazilian verbena" and "Brazilian vervain" are sometimes erroneously applied to the purpletop vervain.

== Description ==
Verbena brasiliensis is an erect herb with serrate leaves and overlapping fruits. Its flowers are usually purplish in color. This plant exhibits a terminal inflorescence, with flowers grouped closely together. It grows as a forb, herb, or subshrub. The stems are roughly 1 meter tall and mostly glabrous below and scabrous-pubescent above. While the lower branches exhibit opposite arrangement, the upper branches grow in an irregular formation. The stem is mildly indented at the nodes. The leaves are membranaceous and have connate bases and have a mildly pubescent underside. The calyx of the flowers is about 3 mm long, five-lobed, and tubular. Nerves in the calyx extend beyond the lobes to form teeth. The posterior nerve is always shortest. The corolla is formed of fused petals that spread open at the end, and is just a little longer than the calyx. The flower possesses reproductive organs of both sexes. The ovary is superior and bicarpellary. The fruit is a schizocarp, a type of dry fruit that splits when mature. It is encased in the calyx, and released by the shortest posterior nerve of the calyx. The nutlets are triangular in cross section and are about 2 mm long each. Four nutlets are generally produced by each fruit, with two per each carpel. Verbena brasiliensis reproduces sexually via seed production.

Verbena brasiliensis is often confused with Verbena litoralis because they are found in similar habitats. However, their inflorescences are different enough to easily separate the species. Verbena brasiliensis has short and compact spikes in open cymes, whereas Verbena litoralis has longer spikes that are arranged in paniculate cymes.

== Taxonomy ==
Verbena brasiliensis was described by Vellozo and published in Florae Fluminensis in 1829. The lectotype is located in Rio de Janeiro.

Synonyms include Verbena approximata Briq., Verbena brasiliensis var. brasiliensis, Verbena brasiliensis var. subglabrata Moldenke, Verbena chacensis Moldenke, Verbena hansenii Greene, Verbena isabellei Briq., Verbena litoralis f. angustifolia Chodat, Verbena litoralis var. brasiliensis (Vell.) Briq. ex Munir, Verbena litoralis f. congesta (Moldenke) Moldenke, Verbena litoralis var. congesta Moldenke, Verbena quadrangularis Vell., and Verbena paucifolia Turczaninow Bull. Soc. Imp.

== Distribution ==
Verbena brasiliensis is currently found in many regions, including North America, Oceania, Africa, Asia, and Europe, where it is largely considered invasive. Verbena brasiliensis is native in South America, specifically, Argentina, Bolivia, Brazil, Chile, Colombia, Ecuador, Paraguay, Peru, and Uruguay. There, it grows in dry conditions on agricultural fields and is considered a weed. In locations where it is invasive, it grows well in man-made areas or riverine environments. In the United States, it is found mostly in grasslands, rangelands, riparian zones, urban areas, and wetlands. The US states where the plant occurs include Oregon, California, Texas, Oklahoma, Missouri, Arkansas, Louisiana, Kentucky, Tennessee, Mississippi, Alabama, Georgia, Florida, South Carolina, North Carolina, Virginia, and Hawaii.

== Uses ==
Verbena brasiliensis has been used as a garden and ornamental plant. It has been cultivated within and largely outside of its native range for aesthetic uses.

== Wildlife ==
Bees are attracted to Verbena brasiliensis as pollinators, as documented in Florida.

Verbena brasiliensis has been documented as a minor food source for large mammals and terrestrial birds, comprising 2-5% of their diet.

Euphyes bayensis, or the Bay Skipper, is a small butterfly found only in herbaceous marshes in estuarine and coastal habitats. This butterfly is endemic to only two locations: one in Texas and one in Mississippi. It has been identified relying on Verbena brasiliensis as a significant source of nectar.

== Management ==
Verbena brasiliensis poses a threat to native plants because it may displace them from their natural habitat. In the mid-south United States, it is considered significantly invasive. In the National Forest System of the United States, Verbena brasiliensis is banned.

In mountain ecosystems of South Africa, invasive Verbena brasiliensis was recorded spreading to increasing elevations year after year, showing its resiliency and ability to spread and adapt.

To prevent the spread of this invasive weed, it is recommended that this plant is not bought, sold, or planted as ornamental decoration because of its tendency to spread beyond the intended area.

For removal of Verbena brasiliensis, the herbicide Triclopyr 480 has been successfully used on this plant in South Africa. 2,4-D has been reported successful against Verbena brasiliensis as well.

Outstar, a blend of hexazinone and sulfometuron, was tested in the southeast United States, and Verbena brasiliensis was found to be tolerant of both active ingredients.
