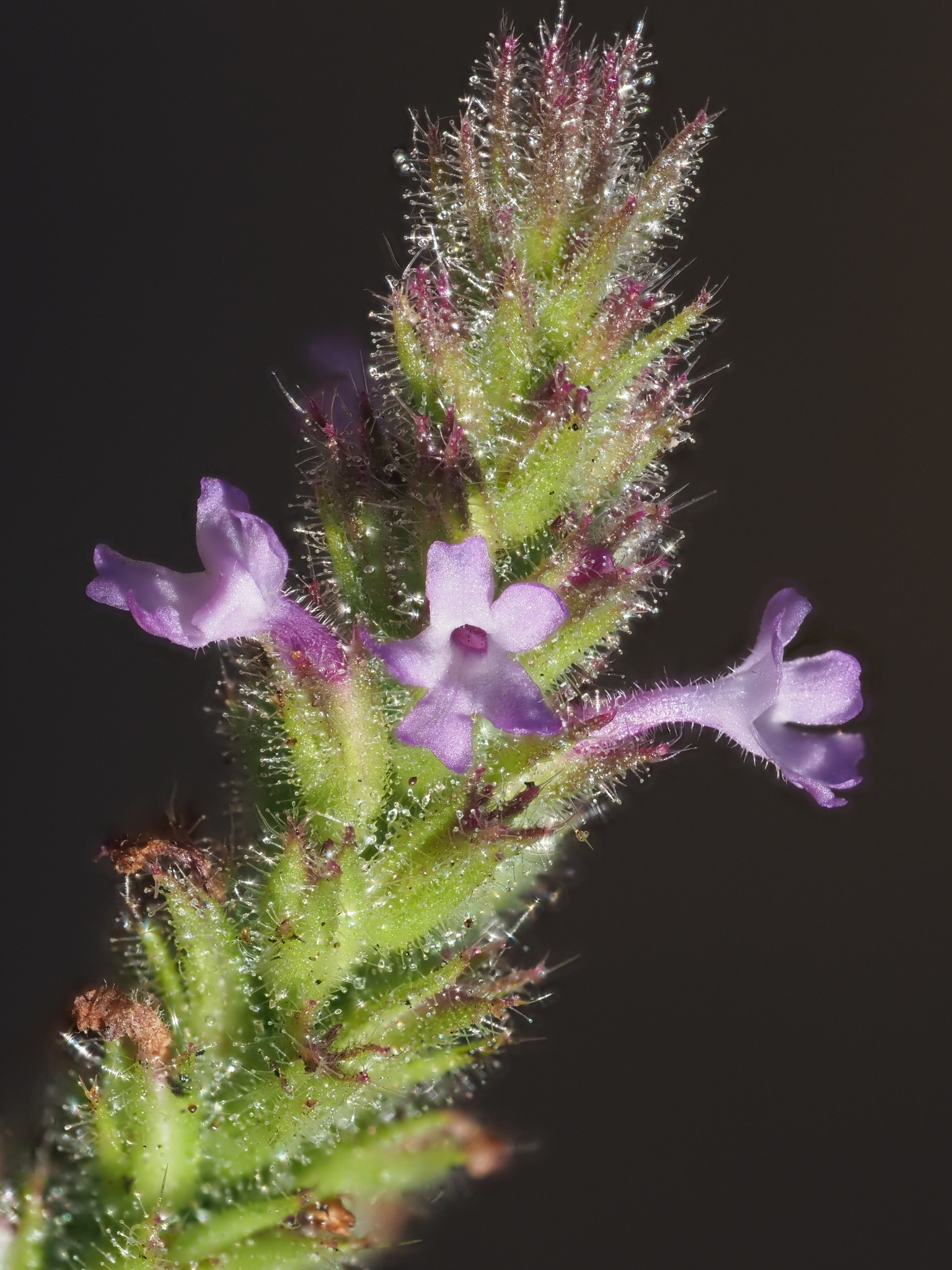

Scientific classification
- Kingdom: Plantae
- Clade: Embryophytes
- Clade: Tracheophytes
- Clade: Spermatophytes
- Clade: Angiosperms
- Clade: Eudicots
- Clade: Asterids
- Order: Lamiales
- Family: Verbenaceae
- Genus: Verbena
- Species: V. gemmea

Binomial name
- Verbena gemmea Uelman

= Verbena gemmea =

Species of flowering plant

Verbena gemmea, commonly known as glittering vervain, is a plant native to the California Floristic Province. It differs from Verbena lasiostachys by having a taller, erect growth habit; stipitate-glandular vestiture; calyces less than or equal to the floral bracts, oval in shape when in fruit; and a preference for moist habitats. The difference in morphological features led to Verbena gemmea being described as a separate species in 2024.
