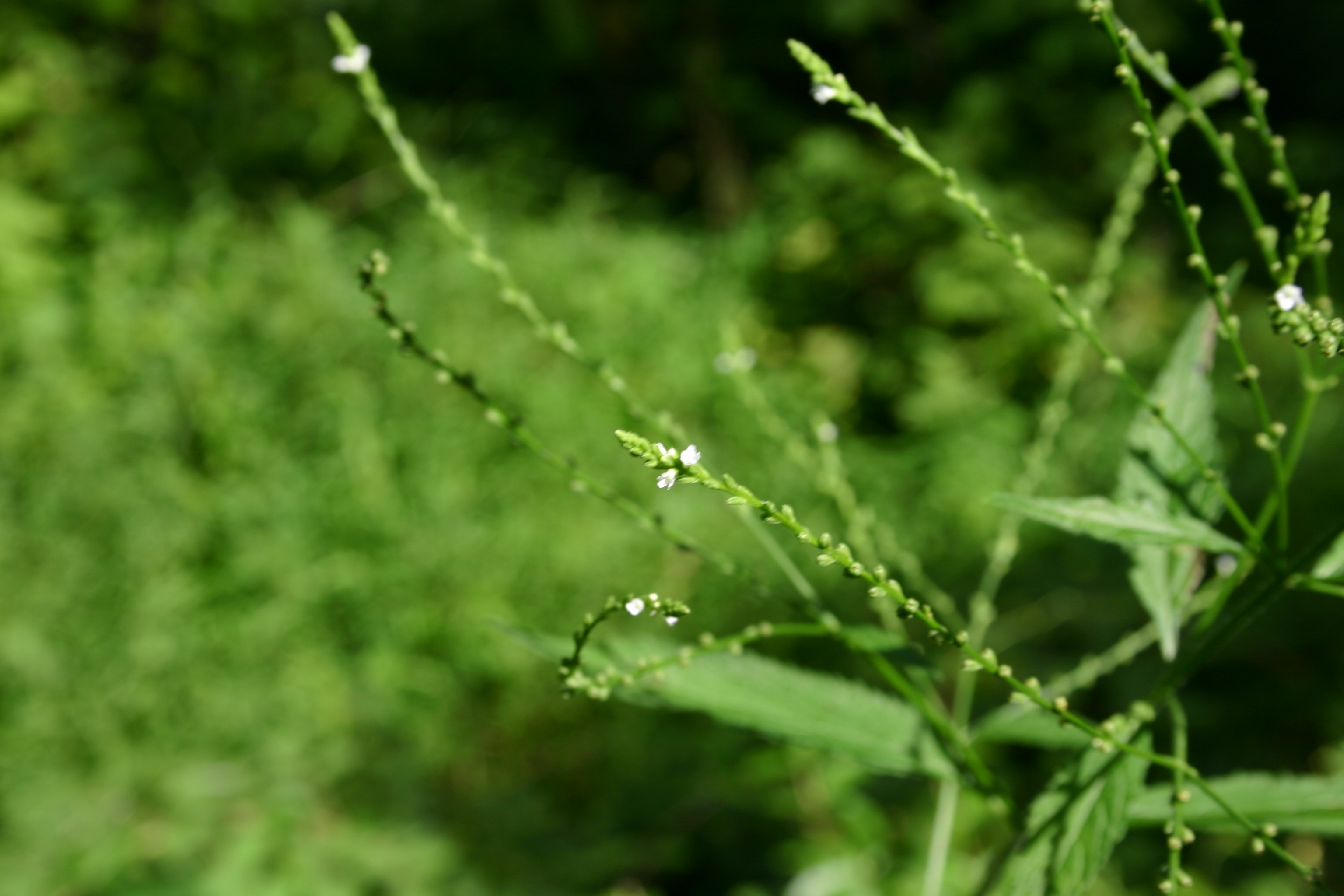
- Inflorescence

Scientific classification
- Kingdom: Plantae
- Clade: Tracheophytes
- Clade: Angiosperms
- Clade: Eudicots
- Clade: Asterids
- Order: Lamiales
- Family: Verbenaceae
- Genus: Verbena
- Species: V. urticifolia

Binomial name
- Verbena urticifolia L.

= Verbena urticifolia =

White vervain

Species of flowering plant

Verbena urticifolia, known as nettle-leaved vervain or white vervain, is a herbaceous plant in the vervain family (Verbenaceae). It belongs to the "true" vervains of genus Verbena.

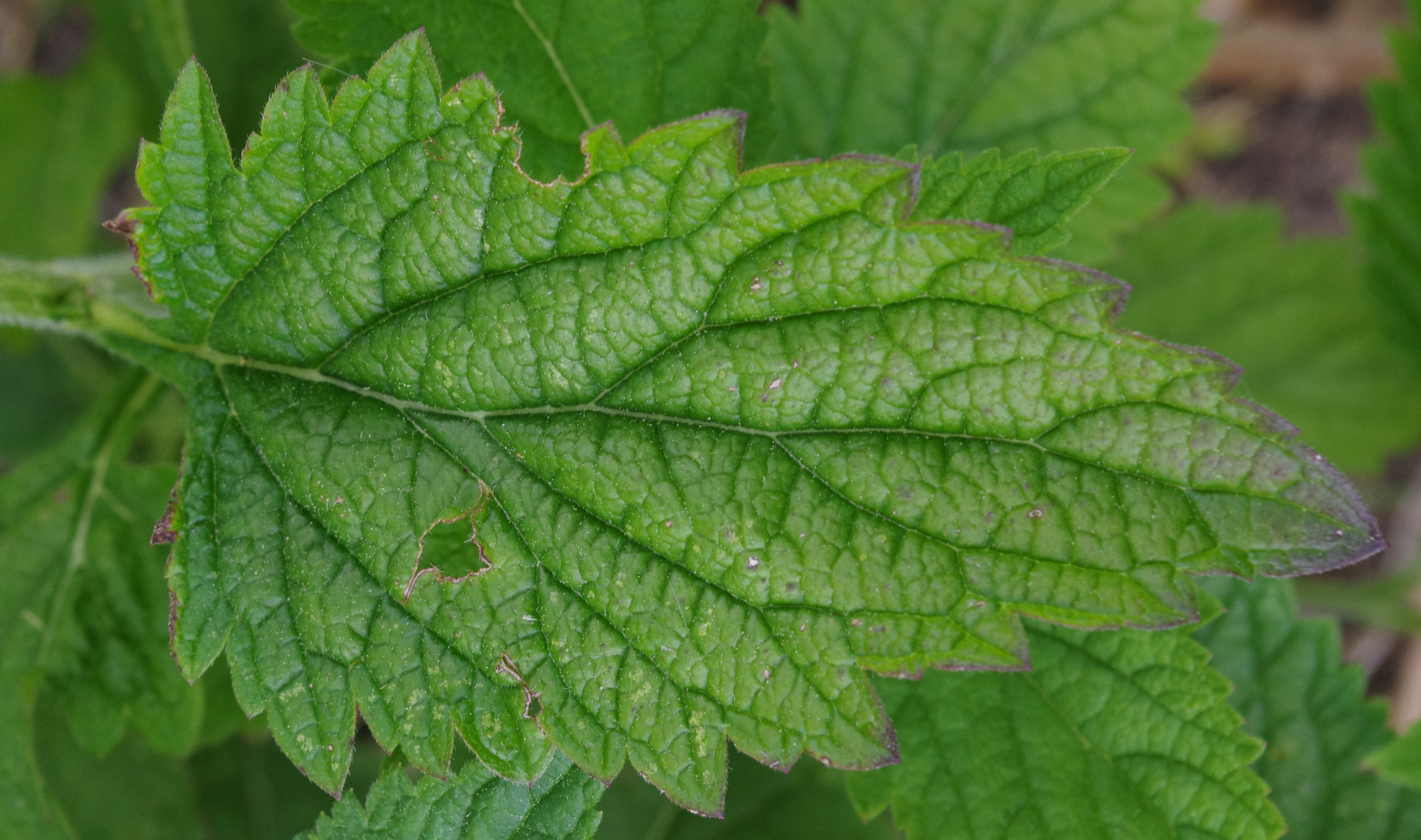
The Urtica-like leaves were the reason for the scientific name urticifolia.

== Description ==
White vervain has opposite, simple leaves on thin, rigid, green stems. The serrated leaves look similar to those of Urtica, which is the reason for the plant being named urticifolia. The small flowers are borne in spikes; they open in summer and unusually for this normally bluish-flowered genus are white. The fruit is a dark-colored capsule with many brown and thin seeds. The entire plant except for the flowers and fruit is covered in stiff bristles.

== Range ==
White vervain is native to eastern North America, excluding Mexico.

== Habitat ==
White vervain is commonly found growing individually in disturbed areas with partial shade. It prefers mesic habitats.

== Relation to other vervains ==
This species may be closest to a group that might include such North American species as V. lasiostachys or V. menthifolia, and the common vervain (V. officinalis) from Europe. Like these, it is diploid with a total of 14 chromosomes. The relationship of the swamp verbena (V. hastata) to these other species is more enigmatic; its evolution might have involved hybridization with the white vervain or a related species in the past.
