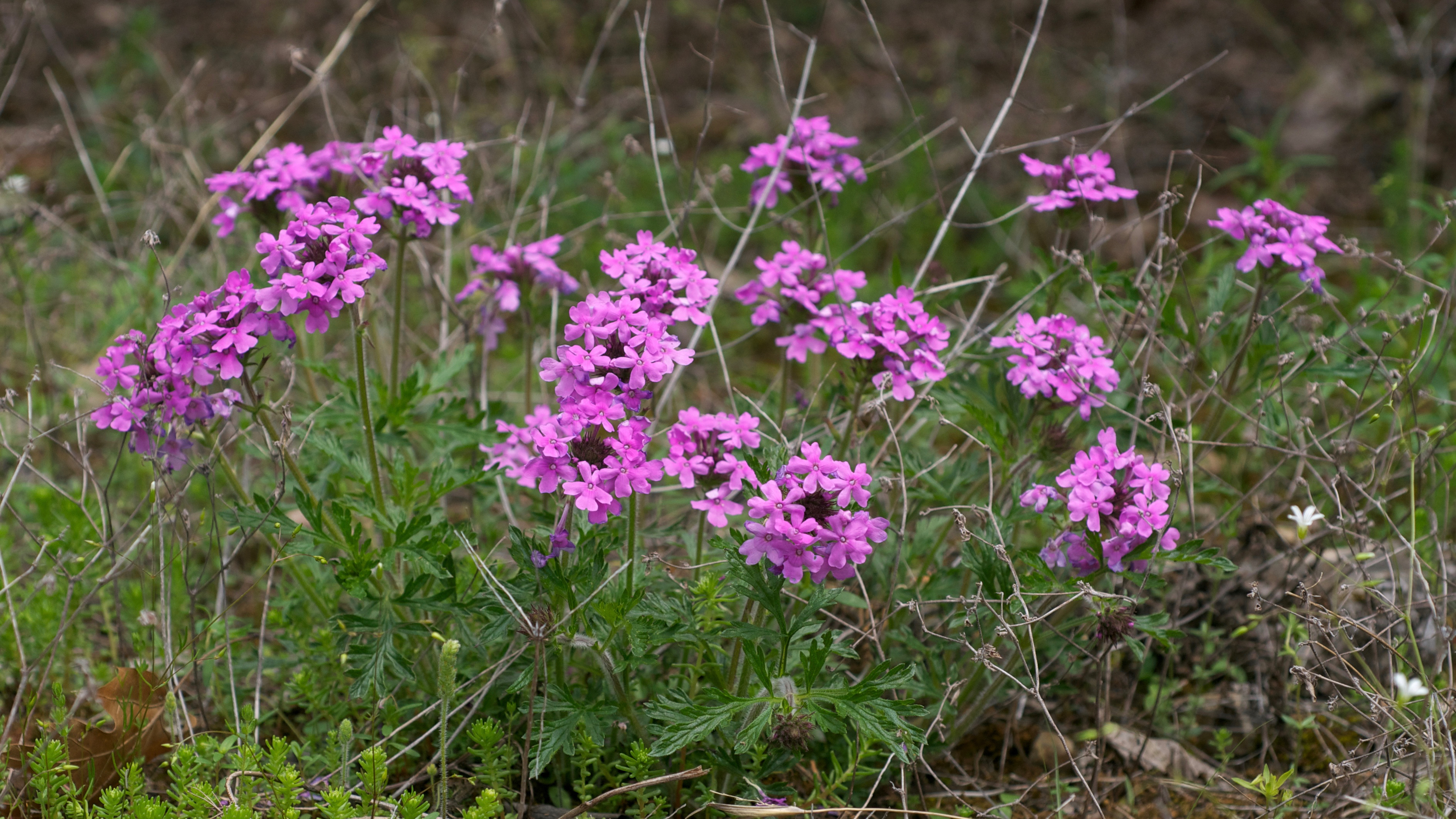

Conservation status
- Secure (NatureServe)

Scientific classification
- Kingdom: Plantae
- Clade: Embryophytes
- Clade: Tracheophytes
- Clade: Angiosperms
- Clade: Eudicots
- Clade: Asterids
- Order: Lamiales
- Family: Verbenaceae
- Genus: Verbena
- Species: V. canadensis

Binomial name
- Verbena canadensis (L.) Britton

Synonyms
- List: Billardiera explanata Moench; Buchnera canadensis L.; Glandularia aubletia (Jacq.) Nutt.; Glandularia canadensis (L.) Small; Glandularia canadensis f. candissima (F.Haage & E.Schmidt) Umber; Glandularia carolinensis J.F.Gmel.; Glandularia drummondii (W.H.Baxter) Small; Glandularia lambertii (Sims) Small; Verbena aubletia Jacq.; Verbena aubletia var. drummondii Lindl.; Verbena aubletia var. lambertii (Sims) M.E.Jones; Verbena canadensis f. candidissima (F.Haage & E.Schmidt) E.J.Palmer & Steyerm.; Verbena canadensis var. candidissima F.Haage & E.Schmidt; Verbena canadensis var. ehrenbergii Thell.; Verbena canadensis subsp. elegans Thell.; Verbena canadensis var. lambertii Thell.; Verbena drummondii W.H.Baxter; Verbena grandiflora Steud.; Verbena intermedia Penny ex G.Don; Verbena lambertii Sims; Verbena lambertii var. rosea D.Don; Verbena longiflora Lam.; Verbena oblaetia Retz.; Verbena rubra Salisb.

= Verbena canadensis =

Species of flowering plant in the verbena family

Verbena canadensis (syn. Glandularia canadensis), commonly known as rose mock vervain, rose verbena, clump verbena or rose vervain is a perennial herbaceous flowering plant in the verbena family (Verbenaceae) with showy pink to purple flowers. It is native to the eastern and south-central areas of the United States. This species is widely cultivated as an ornamental, and naturalized populations have been established outside its native range, such as in the northeastern U.S.

== Description ==
V. canadensis is a perennial herb that grows low to the ground, typically to about 1 foot (30 cm) high. Roots will form where stems touch the ground, and over time the plant will spread to form a low mound. Leaves, up to 8 centimetres (3 in)long, are dark green on the upper surface and lighter green below. Leaves are semi-evergreen, opposite and pinnately-lobed. Flowers are pink to purple, and consist of a tubular corolla that opens up into 4 or 5 spreading lobes. Flowers bloom in the spring and can persist until fall. The plant attracts butterflies, rabbits, and deer.

Often cultivated for its perennial habit in cold-weather climates, selected varieties or hybrids of V. canadensis include "Homestead Purple" (purple flowers), "Snow Flurry" (white flowers), "Carlos" (bicolor flowers; white and lilac), and others. Some cold-hardy cultivated varieties of verbena are also derived from the related Peruvian verbena (V. peruviana).

== Distribution and habitat ==
Its natural habitat is in sunny areas such as glades, forest openings, and on bluffs. It is tolerant of dry conditions. In some areas, the presence of Verbena canadensis is indicative of high-quality natural communities.
