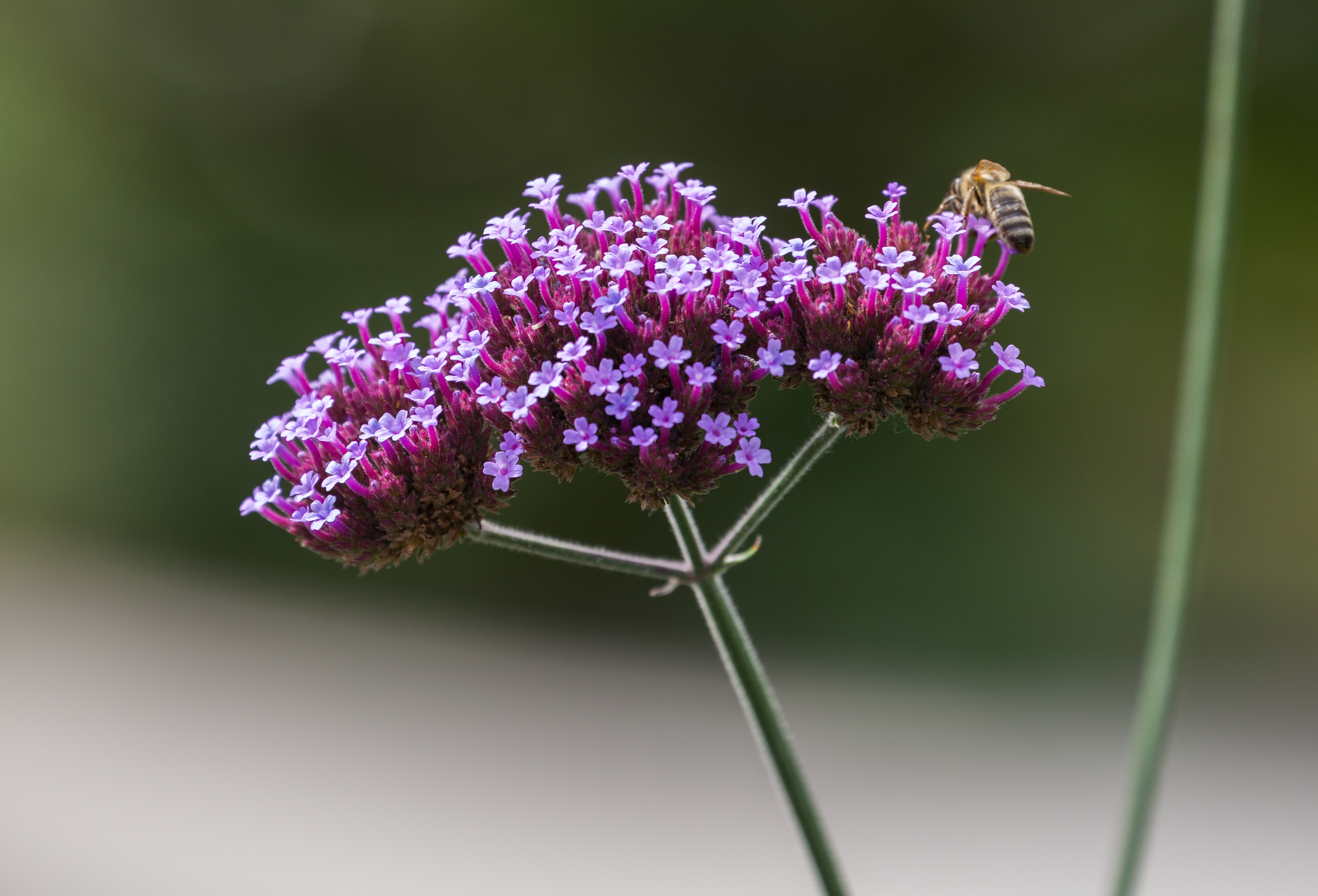
- Botanical Garden Munich-Nymphenburg, Germany

Scientific classification
- Kingdom: Plantae
- Clade: Embryophytes
- Clade: Tracheophytes
- Clade: Spermatophytes
- Clade: Angiosperms
- Clade: Eudicots
- Clade: Asterids
- Order: Lamiales
- Family: Verbenaceae
- Genus: Verbena
- Species: V. bonariensis

Binomial name
- Verbena bonariensis L.

Synonyms
- Verbena bonariensis f. albiflora (Moldenke); Verbena bonariensis var. conglomerata (Briq.); Verbena bonariensis var. longibracteata (Kuntze); Verbena bonariensis f. robustior (Chodat); Verbena elongata (Salisb.); Verbena inamoena (Briq.); Verbena intercedens (Briq.); Verbena trichotoma (Moench)

= Verbena bonariensis =

Species of flowering plant

Verbena bonariensis, commonly known as the purpletop vervain, clustertop vervain, Argentinian vervain, tall verbena or pretty verbena, is a member of the verbena family cultivated as a flowering annual or herbaceous perennial plant. In United States horticulture, it is also known by the ambiguous names purpletop (also used for the grass Tridens flavus) and South American vervain (which can mean any of the numerous species in the genus Verbena occurring on the continent). For the misapplication "Brazilian verbena", see below.

It is native to tropical South America where it grows throughout most of the warm regions, from Colombia and Brazil to Argentina and Chile.

== Description ==
Verbena bonariensis is a tall and slender-stemmed perennial. It can grow to 6 ft (1.8 m) tall and can spread to 3 ft (0.91 m) wide. At maturity, it will develop a woody base. Fragrant lavender to rose-purple flowers are in tight clusters located on terminal and axillary stems, blooming from mid-summer until fall frost. The stem is square with very long internodes. Leaves are ovate to ovate-lanceolate with a toothed margin and grow up to 4 in (100 mm) long.

== Etymology ==
Verbena is derived from Latin, meaning ‘sacred bough’, in reference to the leafy twigs of vervaine (Verbena officinalis) which were historically carried by priests, used in wreaths for druidic rituals, and for medicine. Named by Virgil and Pliny the Elder. The common name, vervaine, comes from the Celtic name, ‘ferfain’.

Its specific epithet bonariensis means 'from Buenos Aires, Argentina'. Buenos means 'good' and aires means 'air' ('good air'). All together, its name translates to "The sacred bough from the land of good air".

== Taxonomy and systematics ==
Verbena bonariensis is a member of the South American vervains, which are polyploid and have more than 14 chromosomes. Among these, it is part of a lineage which might also include Verbena intermedia and seems well distant from Verbena litoralis or Verbena montevidensis for example.

Sometimes, the name Verbena brasiliensis, Brazilian verbena or Brazilian vervain, is found for this species. However, this is the result of a mix-up with V. brasiliensis, the "true" Brazilian verbena, which has been erroneously referred to as V. bonariaensis by several botanists.

=== Subspecies ===
There are two named subspecies:

- Verbena bonariensis subsp. bonariensis L.
- Verbena bonariensis subsp. conglomerata Briq.

== Cultivation ==
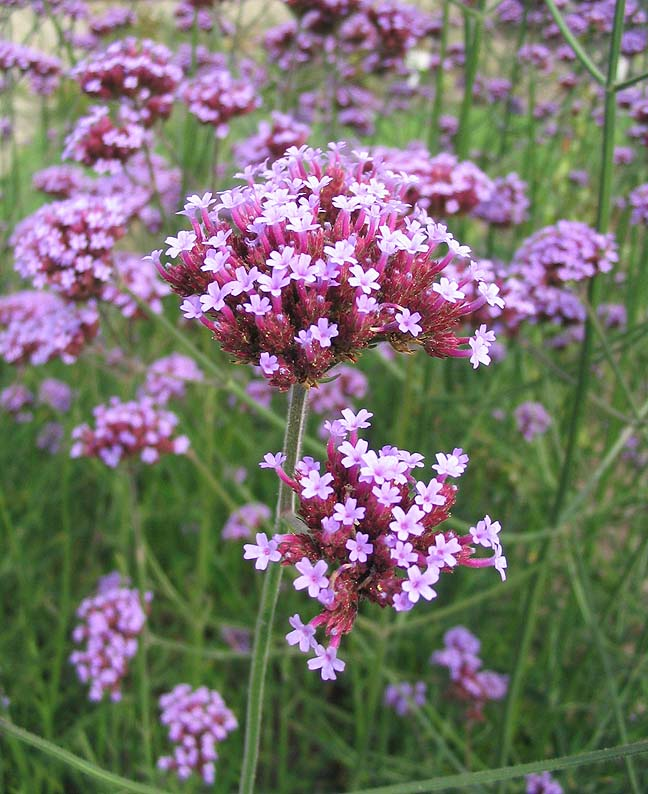

V. bonariensis is cultivated as an ornamental plant for traditional and drought tolerant and 'pollinator-host' gardens and parks.

It is a perennial, hardy in USDA Zones 7-11. It can be grown as an annual in areas where it is not winter hardy and will bloom in the first year when grown from seed. Its long internodes give it a sparse appearance but allow it to intermingle and coexist with other plants. The flowers, which appear in mid- to late summer, are very attractive to butterflies, and provide nectar for native bees and many beneficial garden insects.

This species grows best in a well-drained soil. It prefers full sun to partial shade and needs regular moisture. It has a reputation of rarely being attacked by insect pests, but may be susceptible to powdery mildew. V. bonariensis is commonly grown from seed which germinates readily without pre-treatment, but can also be propagated from herbaceous stem cuttings.

It has gained the Royal Horticultural Society's Award of Garden Merit.

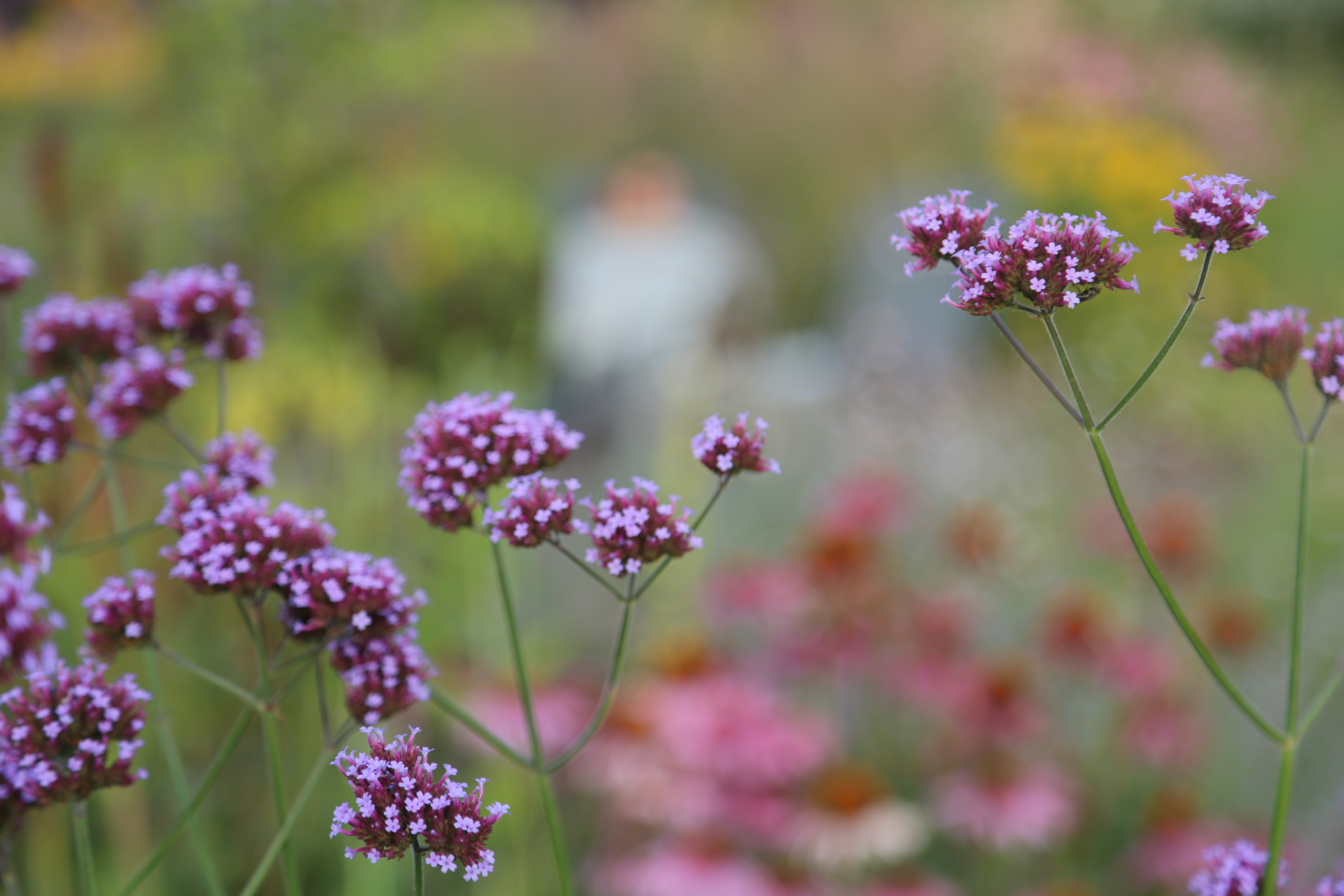

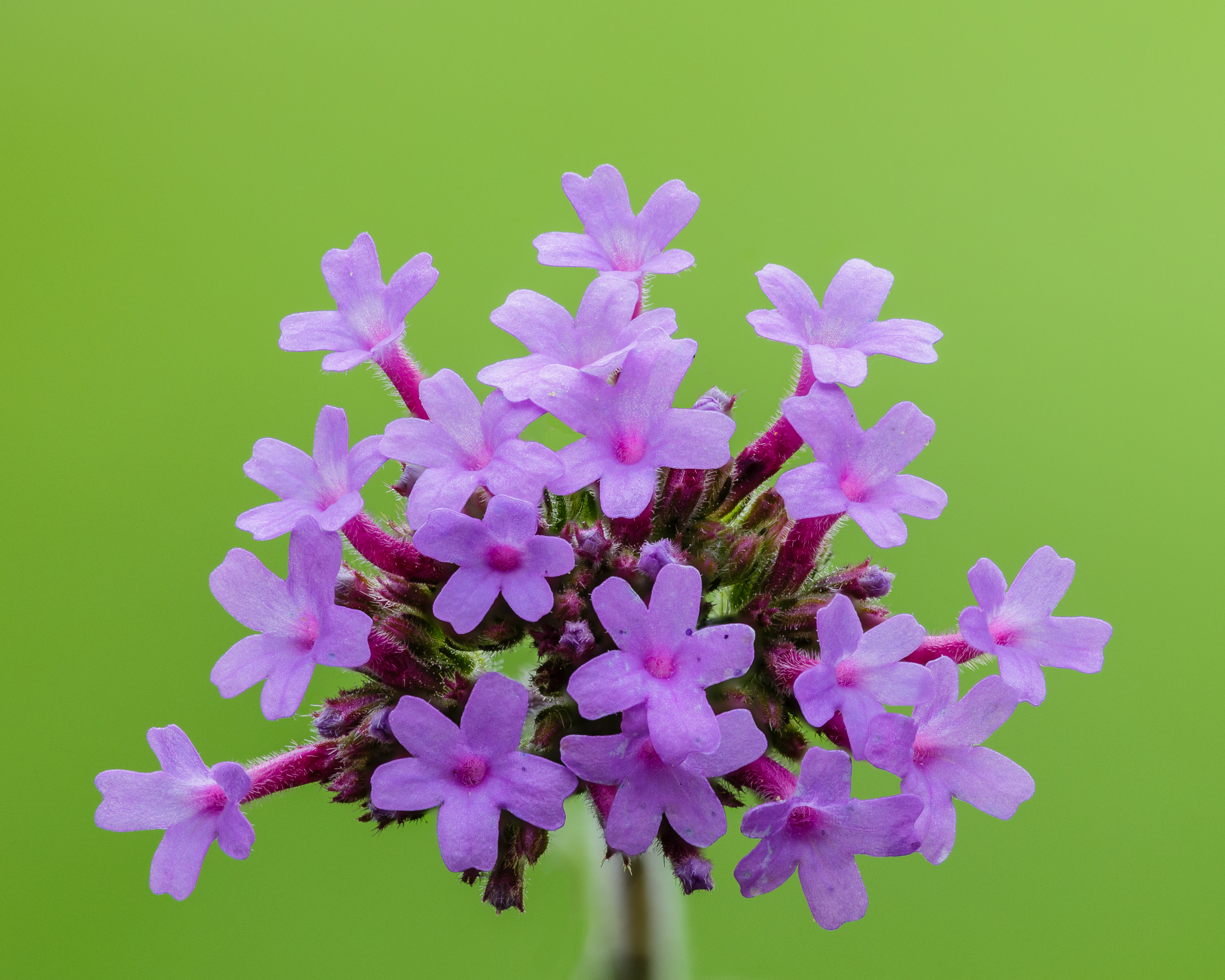
Inflorescence.

== Invasive species ==
V. bonariensis self-seeds readily. This ability has raised concerns that it may become an invasive species and noxious weed in favorable habitats. It has naturalized in a number of southern United States.

Presently, the plant is on the invasive species watchlist for Washington state, naturalized in tropical and southern Africa, temperate Asia, Australia, New Zealand, the United States (including Hawaii), the West Indies, Macaronesia and the Mascarene Islands. According to Pacific Island Ecosystems at Risk, it is considered a weed in Fiji, New Guinea and other South Pacific islands.
