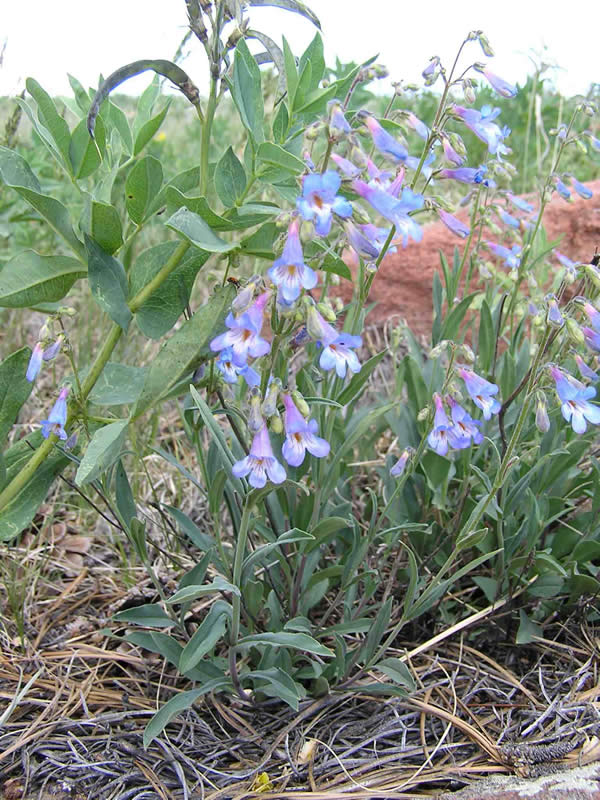

Conservation status
- Imperiled (NatureServe)

Scientific classification
- Kingdom: Plantae
- Clade: Embryophytes
- Clade: Tracheophytes
- Clade: Angiosperms
- Clade: Eudicots
- Clade: Asterids
- Order: Lamiales
- Family: Plantaginaceae
- Genus: Penstemon
- Species: P. degeneri

Binomial name
- Penstemon degeneri Crosswh.

= Penstemon degeneri =

Species of flowering plant

Penstemon degeneri is a species of flowering plant in the plantain family known by the common name Degener's beardtongue. It is endemic to Colorado in the United States, where it occurs in and around the Arkansas River Canyon in Fremont, Custer, and Chaffee Counties.

This species is a perennial herb producing several stems up to 40 centimeters tall from a caudex. The lance-shaped basal leaves are up to 6 centimeters long. Leaves higher on the stem are narrower and have a fine coat of hairs. The inflorescence bears up to 10 tubular flowers in shades of blue and purple. The flower may be nearly 2 centimeters long and measures about half a centimeter wide at the lipped mouth. The inside of the corolla is slightly hairy and the staminode is covered in yellow hairs. Blooming occurs in June and July.

This plant grows in pinyon-juniper woodland and mountain grassland habitat. The rocky soils lie on an igneous bedrock. Individuals grow on canyon rims and in rock cracks. Other plant species in the habitat may include Arabis divaricarpa, Quercus gambelii, Bromus japonicus, Sitanion longifolium, Verbena bracteata, Lesquerella montana, Grindelia squarrosa, Heterotheca horrida, Artemisia frigida, Carex stenophylla, Eriogonum jamesii, Opuntia phaeacantha, Atriplex canescens, Pinus edulis, and Juniperus monosperma.

This species was described in 1965 from a specimen collected by Otto and Isa Degener in Fremont County. There are about 14 occurrences of the plant, which are located in Royal Gorge, the Pike-San Isabel National Forest, and Bureau of Land Management lands.

Many aspects of the plant's ecology and conservation are unknown.

== See also ==
- List of Penstemon species
