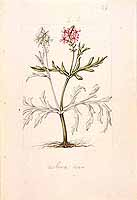

Scientific classification
- Kingdom: Plantae
- Clade: Tracheophytes
- Clade: Angiosperms
- Clade: Eudicots
- Clade: Asterids
- Order: Lamiales
- Family: Verbenaceae
- Genus: Verbena
- Species: V. amoena

Binomial name
- Verbena amoena Paxton

Synonyms
- Verbena grandiflora Sessé & Moc; Glandularia amoena (Paxton) Umber

= Verbena amoena =

Species of plant

Verbena amoena is a plant species in the genus Verbena.

== Range ==
Verbena amoena is endemic to Mexico.
