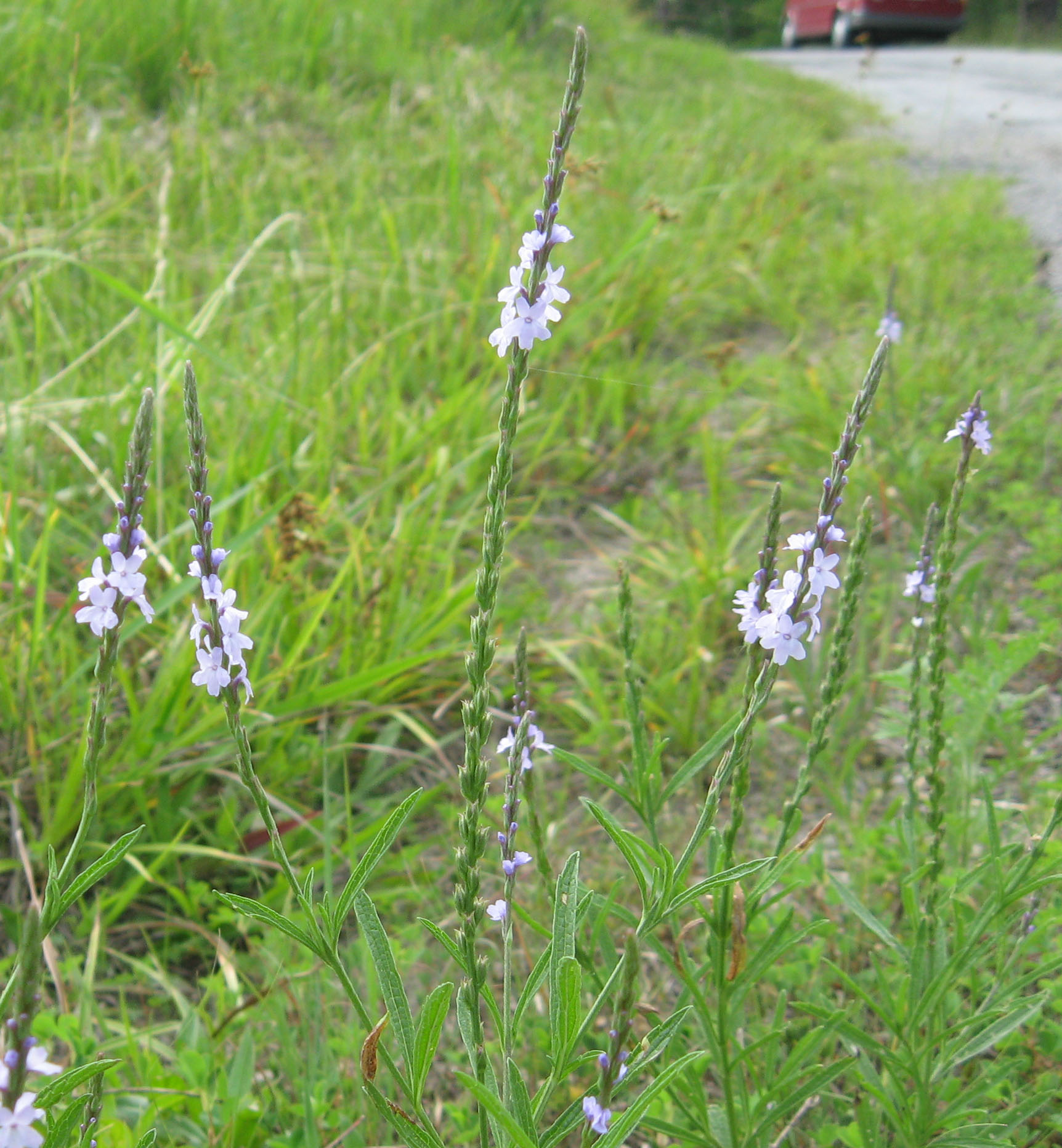

Conservation status
- Secure (NatureServe)

Scientific classification
- Kingdom: Plantae
- Clade: Tracheophytes
- Clade: Angiosperms
- Clade: Eudicots
- Clade: Asterids
- Order: Lamiales
- Family: Verbenaceae
- Genus: Verbena
- Species: V. simplex

Binomial name
- Verbena simplex Lehm.

Synonyms
- Verbena angustifolia Michx.

= Verbena simplex =

Species of flowering plant

Verbena simplex is a species of flowering plant in the vervain family, Verbenaceae. It is commonly known as narrowleaf vervain, and is a perennial herbaceous plant. It is native to central and eastern North America where it is found in open, dry, habitats on calcareous soil. It produces lavender flowers in the summer.

== Description ==
Verbena simplex is a perennial wildflower that grows as erect stems, branching from the base of the plant and unbranched or sparingly branched above, to a height of 24–76 cm (0.8–2.5 ft). Pairs of opposite, narrow leaves are spaced along the stems, which are glabrous or short-pubescent. The leaves measure 3–10 cm (1.25–4 in) long and less than 1 cm (0.5 in) across. The leaves are sessile or they may have a winged petiole. They are unlobed and finely toothed, narrowly lanceolate to oblanceolate or linear.

The inflorescence is a solitary flowering spike, measuring 4–25 cm (1.6–9.8 in) long and 5–8 cm (2.0–3.1 in) in diameter, at the end of the stem. The 5-lobed flowers are dark lavender or purple to white or bluish, 4–6 mm (0.2–0.2 in) long, and shaped like a trumpet.

== Distribution and habitat ==
V. simplex is native in the United States from Nebraska to the west, Texas and Florida to the south, Massachusetts to the east and the Canadian border to the north. In Canada, it is native in Ontario and Quebec. It is tolerant of disturbance, and is often seen in pastures and roadsides with sparse vegetation.

== Conservation status ==
It is listed as endangered in Massachusetts and New Jersey, and as a species of special concern in Connecticut, Minnesota, and Wisconsin.

== Ecology ==
The flowers bloom June through August and are attractive to bees, skippers and probably butterflies.
