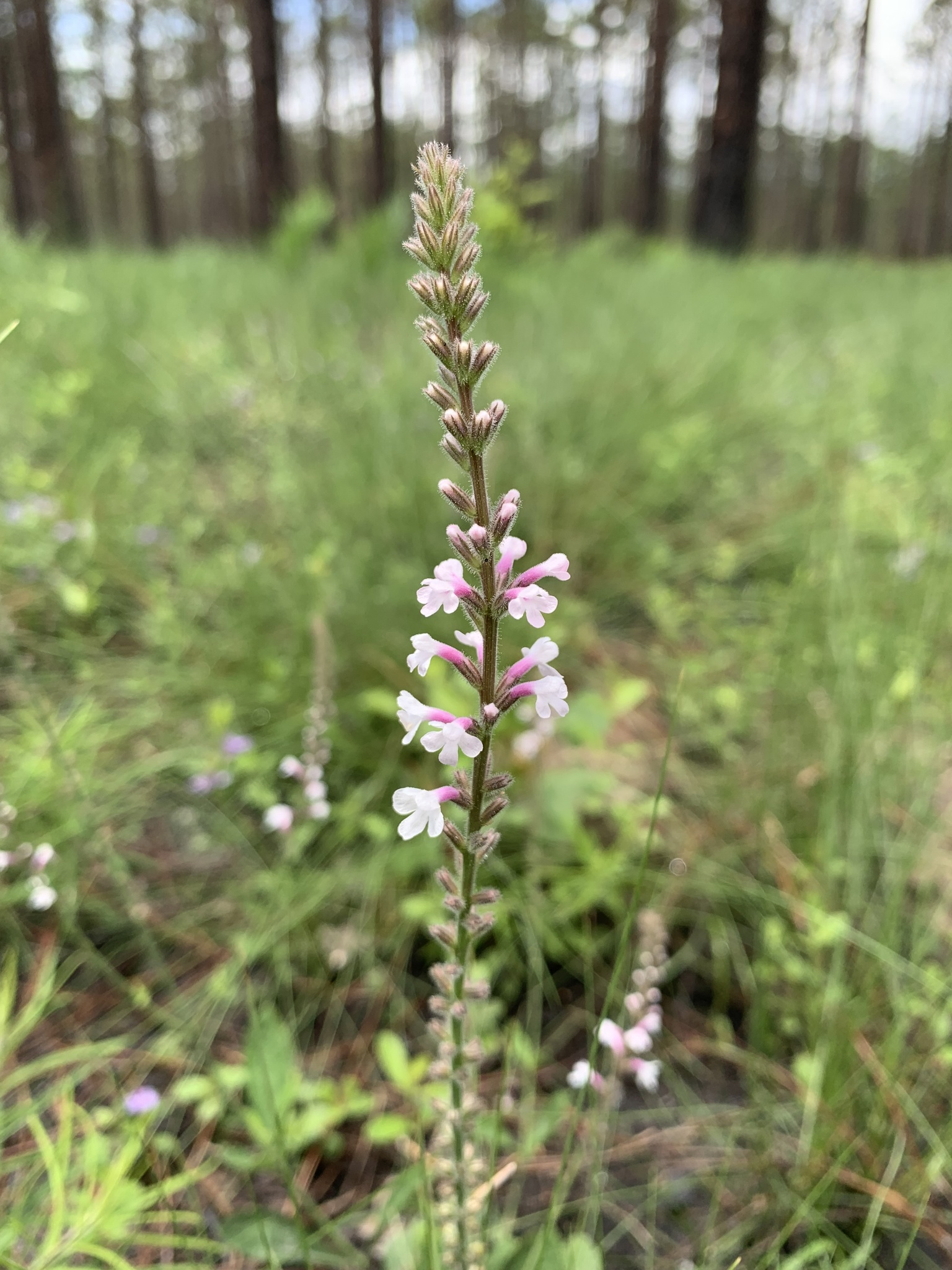

Scientific classification
- Kingdom: Plantae
- Clade: Tracheophytes
- Clade: Angiosperms
- Clade: Eudicots
- Clade: Asterids
- Order: Lamiales
- Family: Verbenaceae
- Genus: Verbena
- Species: V. carnea

Binomial name
- Verbena carnea Medik.

Synonyms
- List: Leptostachya carolinensis (Walter) Kuntze; Phryma carolinensis Walter; Stylodon carneus (Medik.) Moldenke; Stylodon carolinensis (Walter) Small; Stylodon carolinianum Raf.; Stylodon scabrum Raf.; Verbena carolinensis (Walter) Small; Verbena caroliniana Michx.

= Verbena carnea =

Species of flowering plant

Verbena carnea (syn. Stylodon carneus), the Carolina false vervain, is a species of flowering plant in the family Verbenaceae. It is native to Texas and the southeastern United States. A short-lived perennial typically 2 ft (0.6 m) tall, it is found growing in lower but non-coastal areas such as sand hills, scrubby oak woodlands, and in longleaf pine woods.
