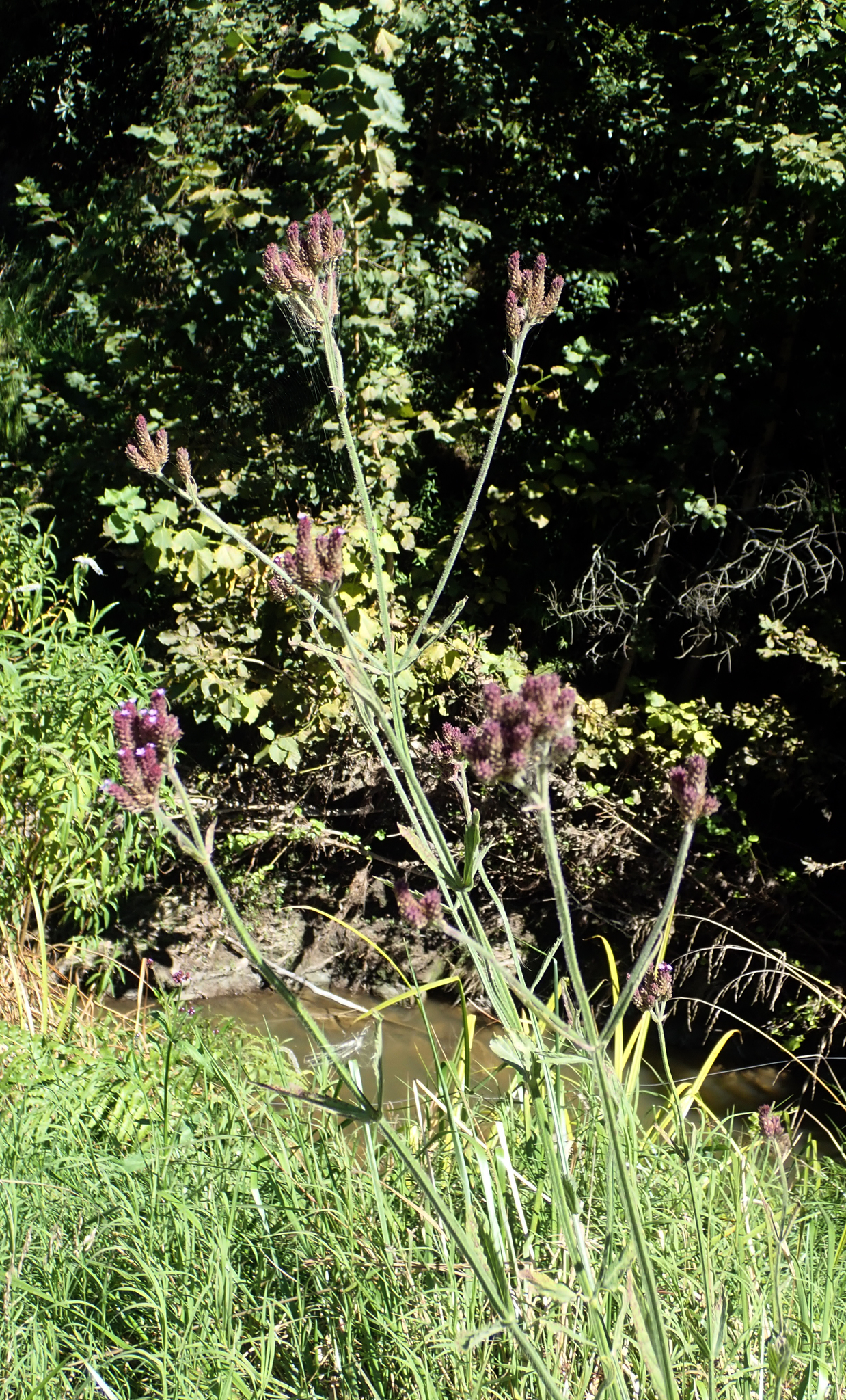

Scientific classification
- Kingdom: Plantae
- Clade: Tracheophytes
- Clade: Angiosperms
- Clade: Eudicots
- Clade: Asterids
- Order: Lamiales
- Family: Verbenaceae
- Genus: Verbena
- Species: V. incompta

Binomial name
- Verbena incompta P.W.Michael

= Verbena incompta =

Species of plant

Verbena incompta, the purpletop vervain, is a species of plant from the genus Verbena. The species was described in 1995 by P.W. Michael.

The species is presumed to be of South American origin, but also appears in Italy and Spain.
