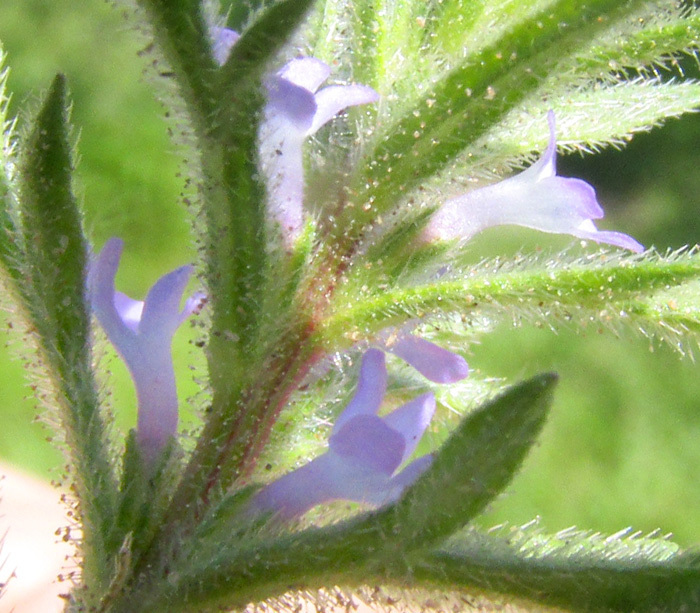
- Verbena canescens flowers
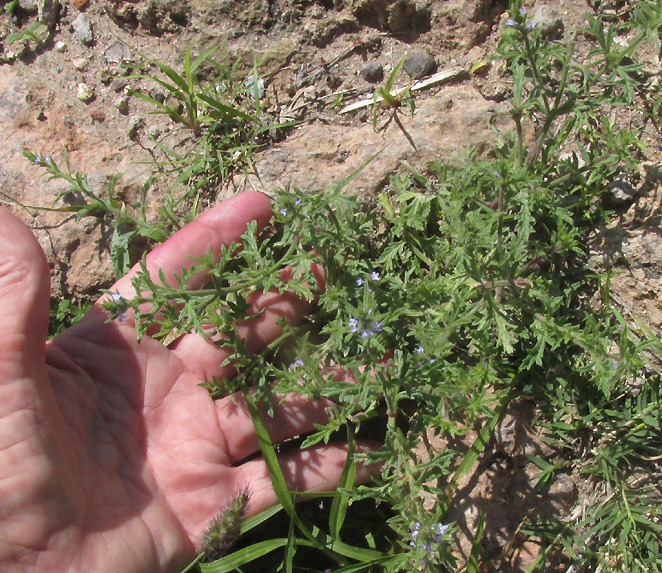
- Verbena canescens form

Scientific classification
- Kingdom: Plantae
- Clade: Tracheophytes
- Clade: Angiosperms
- Clade: Eudicots
- Clade: Asterids
- Order: Lamiales
- Family: Verbenaceae
- Genus: Verbena
- Species: V. canescens

Binomial name
- Verbena canescens Kunth

Synonyms
- Verbena canescens f. albiflora Moldenke (1964); Verbena canescens var. roemeriana L.M.Perry (1933); Verbena roemeriana Scheele (1849); Verbena neei Moldenke (1947)

= Verbena canescens =

Species of flowering plant

Verbena canescens, often called the woolly or gray vervain, is a plant species belonging to the family Verbenaceae.

== Description ==
The canescens in the binomial Verbena canescens, refers to the fine, grayish-white hairs (canescence) covering the plants' green parts. The plant is herbaceous and reaches about 16 inches tall (~40 cm). The stems, instead of being round in cross-section, are squarish. Leaves are longer than wide and their margins are incised with large teeth or shallow lobes.

Several pinkish purple to blue flowers may arise at stem tips, with each flower having below it a leaf-like, sometimes deeply lobed bract. Flower corollas display a somewhat bisymmetrical floral symmetry—they're zygomorphic.

== Distribution ==
In the US, Verbena canescens occurs mainly in central and southern Texas but turns up here and there introduced elsewhere in warmer parts of the country. This is seen on the map of research-grade observations of the species on the species page at the iNaturalist website. That map also indicates that Verbena canescens occurs throughout Mexico's interior highlands, the Mexican Plateau.

== Habitat ==
In Texas, Verbena canescens is described as occurring in canyons and foothills from 2,000 to 6,000 feet in elevation. In Mexico, it's documented from highland grasslands and scrublands.

== Discovery and naming ==
The first Verbena canescens ever collected, preserved and described scientifically was encountered on a September day in the mountains around the town of Guanajuato, Mexico, at an altitude of 1000–1250 meters. This information is found in an 1815 publication by Alexander von Humboldt, Aimé Bonpland, and Carl Sigismund Kunth describing the plant. The Latin words used were "Crescit in montibus Mexicanorum, prope Guanaxuato, Marfil et sodianam Belgrado, alt. 1000-1250 hex. Floret Septembri." The publication was entitled Nova genera et species plantarum: quas in peregrinatione ad plagam aequinoctialem orbis novi collegerunt /descripserunt, partim adumbraverunt Amat. Bonpland et Alex. de Humboldt; ex schedis autographis Amati Bonplandi in ordinem digessit Carol. Sigismund. Kunth .... " The year the plant was collected isn't given in its description, but it's known that Humboldt visited Guajuato in August and September 1803.
