= Purpletop =

Purpletop is a common name for several plants and may refer to:

- Tridens flavus, purpletop tridens
- Verbena bonariensis, purpletop vervain
