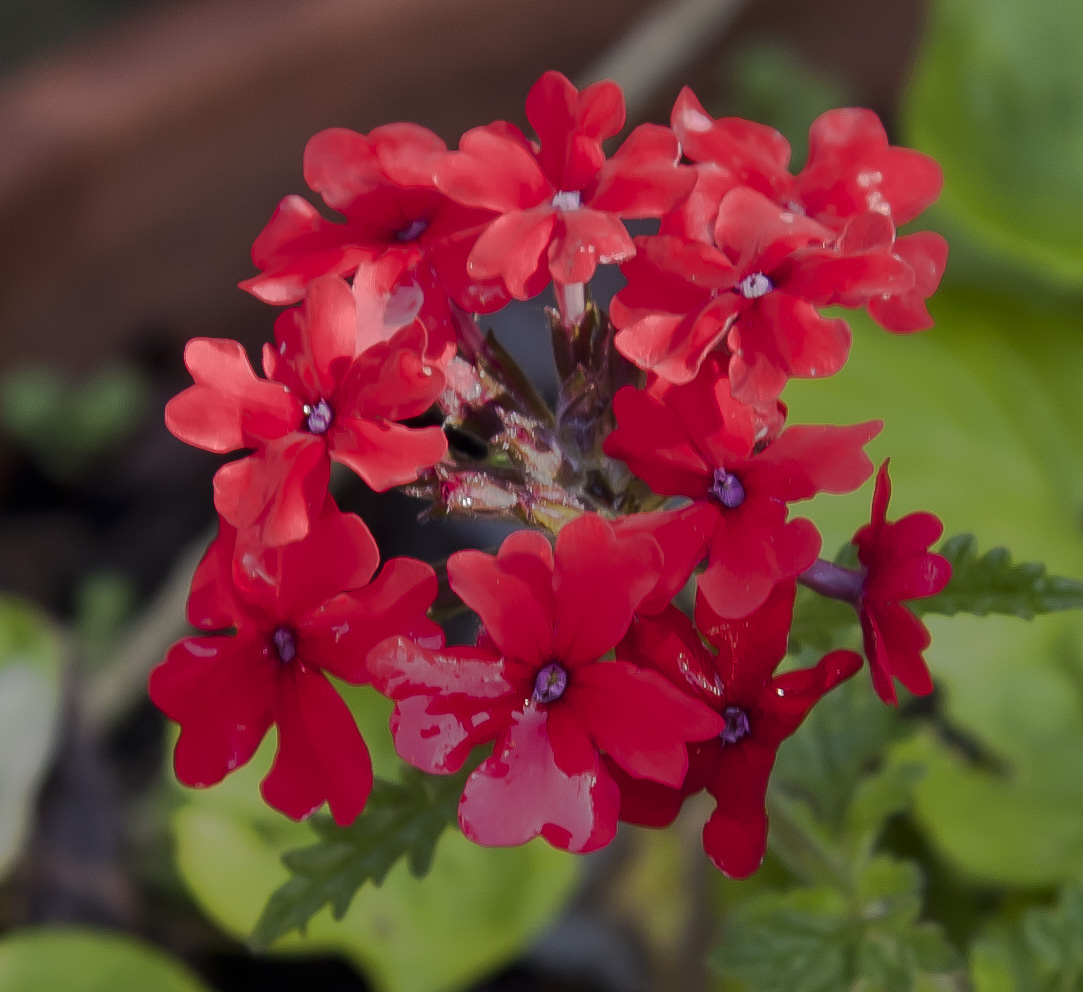
- Flowers
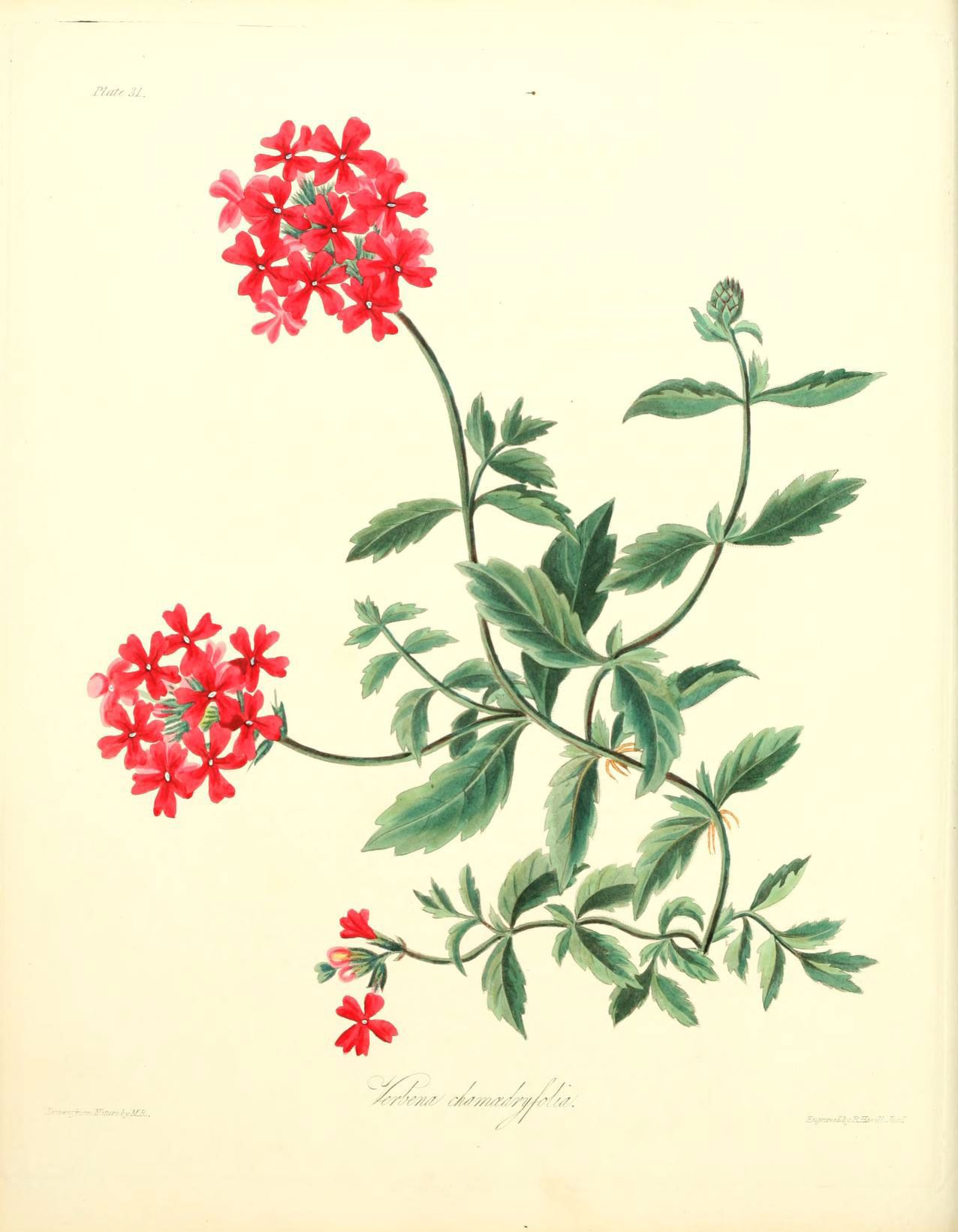
- Botanical illustration

Scientific classification
- Kingdom: Plantae
- Clade: Tracheophytes
- Clade: Angiosperms
- Clade: Eudicots
- Clade: Asterids
- Order: Lamiales
- Family: Verbenaceae
- Genus: Verbena
- Species: V. peruviana

Binomial name
- Verbena peruviana (L.) Britton

Synonyms
- List: Erinus peruvianus L.; Glandularia peruviana (L.) Small; Verbena chamaedryfolia Juss.; Verbena chamaedryfolia f. melindroides (Cham.) Voss; Verbena melindres Gillies; Verbena melindroides Cham.; Verbena melissoides Sweet ex Steud.; Verbena peruviana var. glabriuscula Kuntze; Verbena peruviana f. rosea Moldenke; Verbena peruviana var. subbipinnatisecta Kuntze; Verbena platensis var. latiuscula Briq.; Verbena platensis var. stenodes Briq.; Verbena sanguinea Larrañaga; Verbena veronicifolia Sm.

= Verbena peruviana =

Species of flowering plant

Verbena peruviana (syn. Glandularia peruviana), the Peruvian mock vervain, is a species of flowering plant in the family Verbenaceae. It is native to Bolivia, southern Brazil, northern Argentina, Paraguay, and Uruguay, but not Peru, and has been introduced to scattered locations elsewhere, including the former Czechoslovakia, the US state of Illinois, and the Leeward Islands. Under the synonym Glandularia peruviana, its cultivar 'Balendpibi' (trade name Endurascape Pink Bicolor) has gained the Royal Horticultural Society's Award of Garden Merit.
