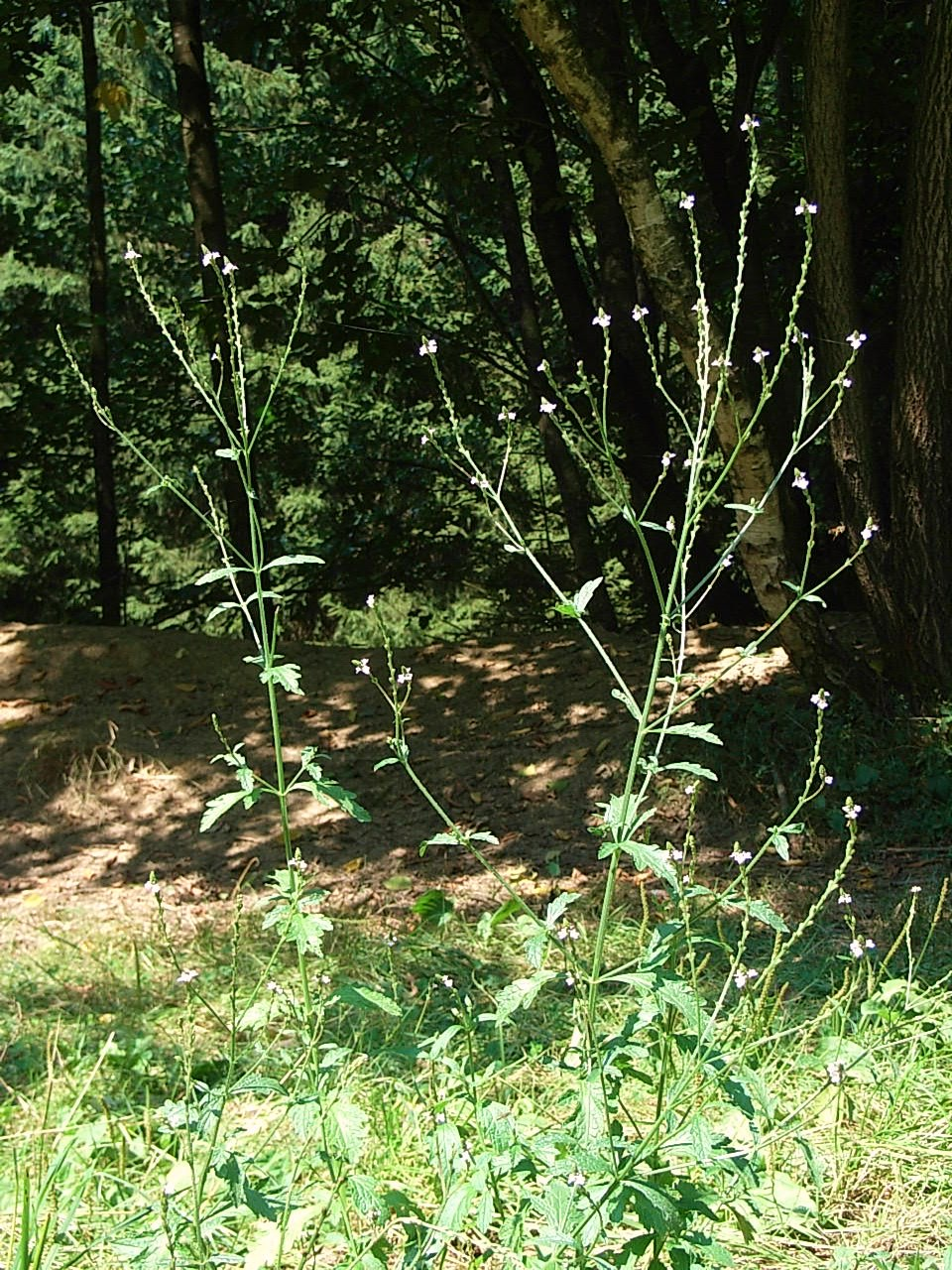
- Common vervain, Verbena officinalis

Scientific classification
- Kingdom: Plantae
- Clade: Tracheophytes
- Clade: Angiosperms
- Clade: Eudicots
- Clade: Asterids
- Order: Lamiales
- Family: Verbenaceae
- Genus: Verbena; L.

Type species
- Verbena officinalis L.

Species
- See text

Synonyms
- List: Aubletia Le Monn. ex Rozier; Billardiera Moench; Burseria Loefl.; Glandularia J.F.Gmel.; Helleranthus Small; Obletia Rozier; Patya Neck.; Shuttleworthia Meisn.; Styleurodon Raf.; Stylodon Raf.; Uwarowia Bunge; Verbenella Spach

= Verbena =

Genus of plants

Verbena (/vərˈbiːnə/), also known as vervain or (in obsolete spelling) verveine, is a genus in the family Verbenaceae. It contains about 150 species of annual and perennial herbaceous or semi-woody flowering plants. The majority of the species are native to the Americas and Asia; however, Verbena officinalis, the common vervain or common verbena, is the type species and native to Europe.

== Naming ==
In English, the name Verbena is usually used in the United States and the United Kingdom; elsewhere, the terms verveine or vervain are in use.

== Description ==
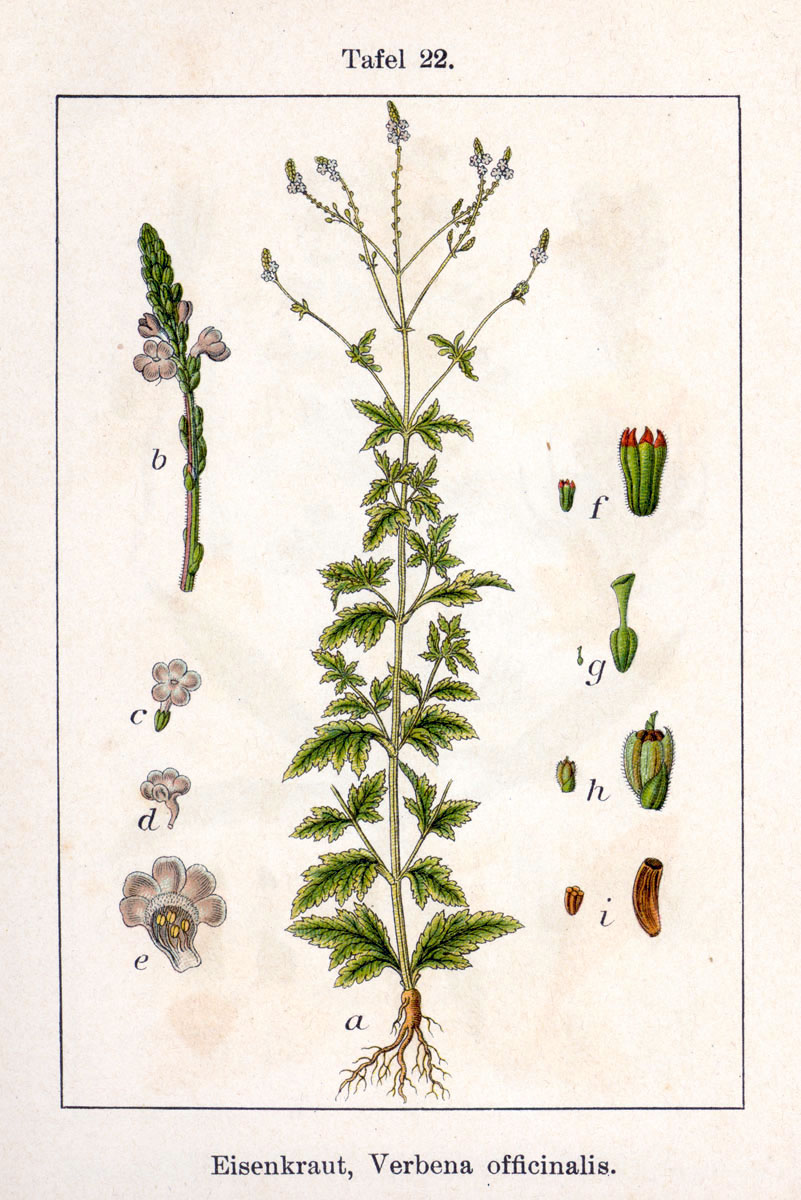
Botanical illustration of common vervain (V. officinalis) from Deutschlands Flora in Abbildungen by Johann Georg Sturm and Jacob Sturm, 1796

Verbena is a herbaceous flowering plant, belonging to the Verbenaceae family, and may be annual or perennial depending on the species. The leaves are usually opposite, simple, and in many species hairy, often densely so. The flowers are small, with five petals, and borne in dense spikes. Typically some shade of blue, they may also be white, pink, or purple, especially in cultivars.

The genus can be divided into a diploid North American and a polyploid South American lineage, both with a base chromosome number of seven. The European species is derived from the North American lineage. It seems that verbena as well as the related mock vervains (Glandularia) evolved from the assemblage provisionally treated under the genus name Junellia; both other genera were usually included in the Verbenaceae until the 1990s. Intergeneric chloroplast gene transfer by an undetermined mechanism – though probably not hybridization – has occurred at least twice from vervains to Glandularia, between the ancestors of the present-day South American lineages and once more recently, between V. orcuttiana or V. hastata and G. bipinnatifida. In addition, several species of verbena are of natural hybrid origin; the well-known garden vervain/verbena has an entirely muddy history. The relationships of this close-knit group are therefore hard to resolve with standard methods of computational phylogenetics.

== Cultivation ==
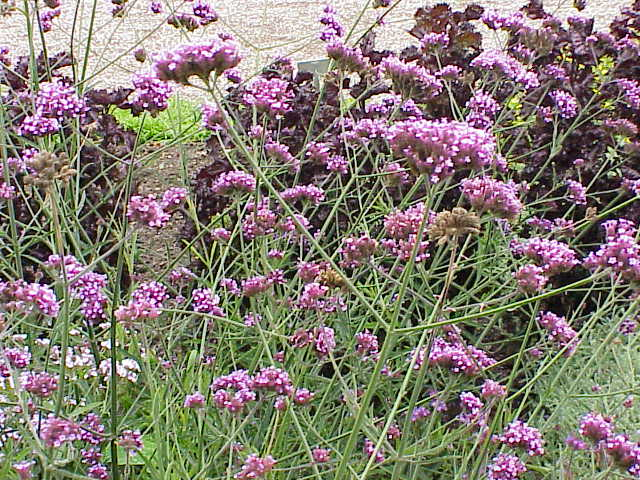
Purpletop vervain (V. bonariensis) as an ornamental plant

Some species, hybrids and cultivars of verbena are used as ornamental plants. They are drought-resistant, tolerating full to partial sun, and enjoy well-drained, average soils. Plants are usually grown from seed. Some species and hybrids are not hardy and are treated as half-hardy annuals in bedding schemes. The most common cultivated kinds of verbena for the garden are the freeze-intolerant garden verbena (V. × hybrida), purpletop vervain (V. bonariensis), and various cold-hardy mock vervains (V. canadensis, V. peruviana).

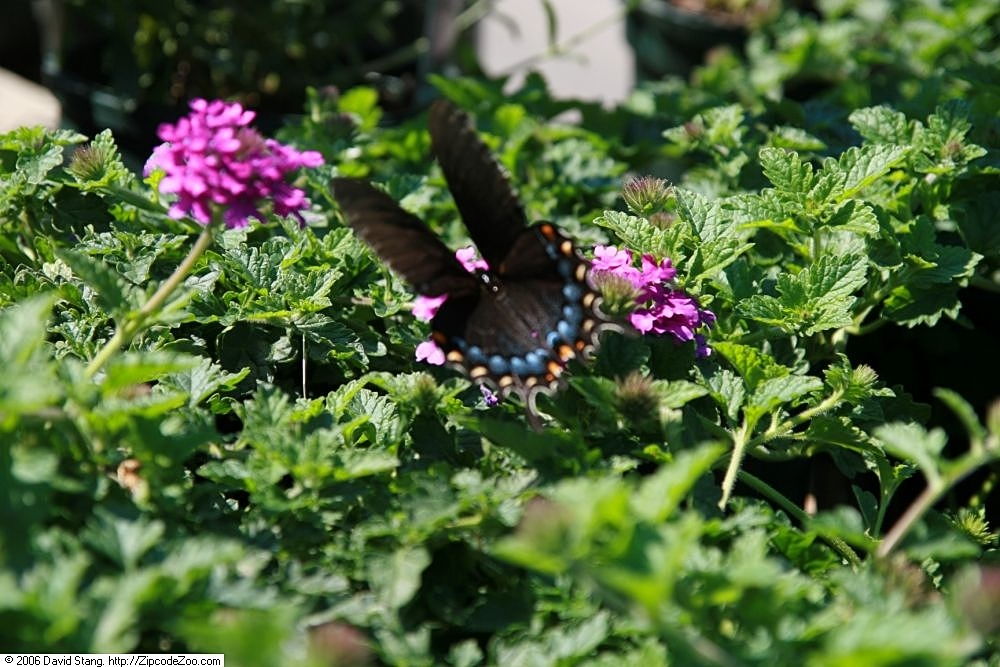
A spicebush swallowtail (Papilio troilus) feeding on a cultivated rose verbena (V. canadensis).

They are valued in butterfly gardening in suitable climates, attracting Lepidoptera such as the Hummingbird hawk-moth, Chocolate albatross, or the Pipevine swallowtail, and also hummingbirds, especially V. officinalis, which is also grown as a honey plant.

The hybrid cultivars "Silver Anne" and "Sissinghurst" have gained the Royal Horticultural Society's Award of Garden Merit.

== Pests and diseases ==
For some verbena pathogens, see List of verbena diseases. Cultivated verbenas are sometimes parasitized by sweet potato whitefly (Bemisia tabaci) and spread this pest to other crops.

== Uses ==
Although verbena ("vervain") has been used in herbalism and traditional medicine, usually as an herbal tonic, there is no high-quality evidence for its effectiveness. Verbena has been listed as one of the 38 plants used to prepare Bach flower remedies, a kind of alternative medicine promoted for its effect on health. According to Cancer Research UK, "Essences do not prevent, control, or cure cancer or any other physical condition.

The essential oil of various species, mainly common vervain, is traded as "Spanish verbena oil". Considered inferior to oil of lemon verbena (Aloysia citrodora) in perfumery, it is of some commercial importance for herbalism.

== In culture ==
Verbena has long been associated with divine and other supernatural forces. It was called "tears of Isis" in ancient Egypt, and later called "Hera's tears". In ancient Greece, it was dedicated to Eos Erigineia. The generic name is the Latin term for a plant sacred to the ancient Romans. Pliny the Elder describes verbena presented on Jupiter altars; it is not entirely clear if this referred to a verbena rather than the general term for prime sacrificial herbs.

Nulla tamen Romae nobilitatis plus habet quam hiera botane. aliqui aristereon, nostri verbenacam vocant. haec est quam legatos ferre ad hostes indicavimus; hac Iovis mensa verritur, domus purgantur lustranturque. genera eius duo: foliosa, quam feminam putant, mas rarioribus foliis.

— Pliny the Elder, Naturalis Historia Liber XXV, LIX
Translation:

No plant however is so renowned among the Romans as hiera botane ('sacred plant'). Some call it aristereon, and Latin writers verbenaca. This is the plant which I mentioned as carried to the enemy by envoys. With this the table of Jupiter is swept, and homes are cleansed and purified. There are two kinds of it; one has many leaves and is thought to be female, the other, the male, has fewer leaves.

— translated by Harris Rackham

Pliny the Elder notes "the Magi especially make the maddest statements about the plant: that [among other things] a circle must be drawn with iron round the plant". The common names of verbena in many Central and Eastern European languages often associate it with iron. These include for example the Dutch IJzerhard ("iron-hard"), Danish Læge-Jernurt ("medical ironwort"), German Echtes Eisenkraut ("true ironherb"), Slovak Železník lekársky ("medical ironherb"), and Hungarian vasfű ("iron grass").

In the early Christian era, folk legend stated that V. officinalis was used to stanch Jesus' wounds after his removal from the cross. It was consequently called "holy herb" or (e.g. in Wales) "Devil's bane".

According to the Wiccan writer Doreen Valiente, Vervain flowers signify the goddess Diana and are often depicted on cimaruta, traditional Italian amulets. In the 1870 The History and Practice of Magic by "Paul Christian" (Jean-Baptiste Pitois), it is employed in the preparation of a mandragora charm. The book also describes its antiseptic capabilities (p. 336), and use as a protection against spells (pp. 339, 414). Romani people use vervain for love and good luck.

While common vervain is not native to North America, it has been introduced there; for example, the Pawnee have adopted it as an entheogen enhancer and in oneiromancy (dream divination), much as Calea zacatechichi is used in Mexico.

An indeterminate vervain is among the plants on the eighth panel of the New World Tapestry (Expedition to Cape Cod).

In the Victorian language of flowers, verbena held the dual meaning of enchantment and sensibility.

== Species ==
The following species are accepted: (See also Aloysia, Glandularia, and Junellia for species formerly placed here.)

- Verbena alata Otto ex Sweet
- Verbena × allenii Moldenke
- Verbena barbata Graham
- Verbena × bingenensis Moldenke
- Verbena × blanchardii Moldenke
- Verbena bonariensis L.
- Verbena bracteata Cav. ex Lag. & Rodr.
- Verbena brasiliensis Vell.
- Verbena californica Moldenke
- Verbena calinfera G.L.Nesom
- Verbena canescens Kunth
- Verbena caniuensis Moldenke
- Verbena carnea Medik.
- Verbena carolina L.
- Verbena × clemensiorum Moldenke
- Verbena cloverae Moldenke
- Verbena dalloniana Quézel
- Verbena × deamii Moldenke
- Verbena delicatula Mart. & Zucc.
- Verbena demissa Moldenke
- Verbena dissecta Willd. ex Spreng.
- Verbena ehrenbergiana Schauer
- Verbena × engelmannii Moldenke
- Verbena ephedroides Cham.
- Verbena falcata G.L.Nesom
- Verbena filicaulis Schauer
- Verbena gemmea Uelman
- Verbena glabrata Kunth
- Verbena × goodmanii Moldenke
- Verbena goyazensis Moldenke
- Verbena gracilescens (Cham.) Herter
- Verbena gracilis Desf.
- Verbena grisea B.L.Rob. & Greenm.
- Verbena halei Small
- Verbena hastata L.
- Verbena hirta Spreng.
- Verbena hispida Ruiz & Pav.
- Verbena × illicita Moldenke
- Verbena incompta P.W.Michael
- Verbena intermedia Gillies & Hook.
- Verbena jessicae Nesom & G.S.Hinton
- Verbena lasiostachys Link – western vervain
- Verbena lindbergii Moldenke
- Verbena lindmanii Briq.
- Verbena litoralis Kunth – seashore vervain
- Verbena livermorensis B.L.Turner & G.L.Nesom
- Verbena macdougalii A.Heller
- Verbena madrensis G.L.Nesom
- Verbena malmei Moldenke
- Verbena menthifolia Benth.
- Verbena moctezumae G.L.Nesom & T.Van Devender
- Verbena × moechina Moldenke
- Verbena montevidensis Spreng.
- Verbena moranii G.L.Nesom
- Verbena neomexicana (A.Gray) Briq.
- Verbena officinalis L.
- Verbena × ostenii Moldenke
- Verbena ovata Cham.
- Verbena paranensis Moldenke
- Verbena parodii (Covas & Schnack) Moldenke
- Verbena paulensis Moldenke
- Verbena perennis Wooton – pinleaf vervain
- Verbena × perriana Moldenke
- Verbena × perturbata Moldenke
- Verbena pinetorum Moldenke
- Verbena plicata Greene
- Verbena recta Kunth
- Verbena regnelliana Moldenke
- Verbena reitzii Moldenke
- Verbena rigida Spreng. – tuberous vervain
- Verbena rugosa Mill.
- Verbena × rydbergii Moldenke
- Verbena sagittalis Cham.
- Verbena santiaguensis (Covas & Schnack) Moldenke
- Verbena scabra Vahl – sandpaper vervain
- Verbena scabrella Sessé & Moc.
- Verbena simplex Lehm. – narrow-leaved vervain
- Verbena sphaerocarpa L.M.Perry
- Verbena stricta Vent. – hoary vervain
- Verbena strigosa Cham.
- Verbena × stuprosa Moldenke
- Verbena supina L.
- Verbena townsendii Svenson
- Verbena urticifolia L. – white vervain
- Verbena valerianoides Kunth
- Verbena villifolia Hayek
- Verbena xutha Lehm. – gulf vervain

== Gallery ==
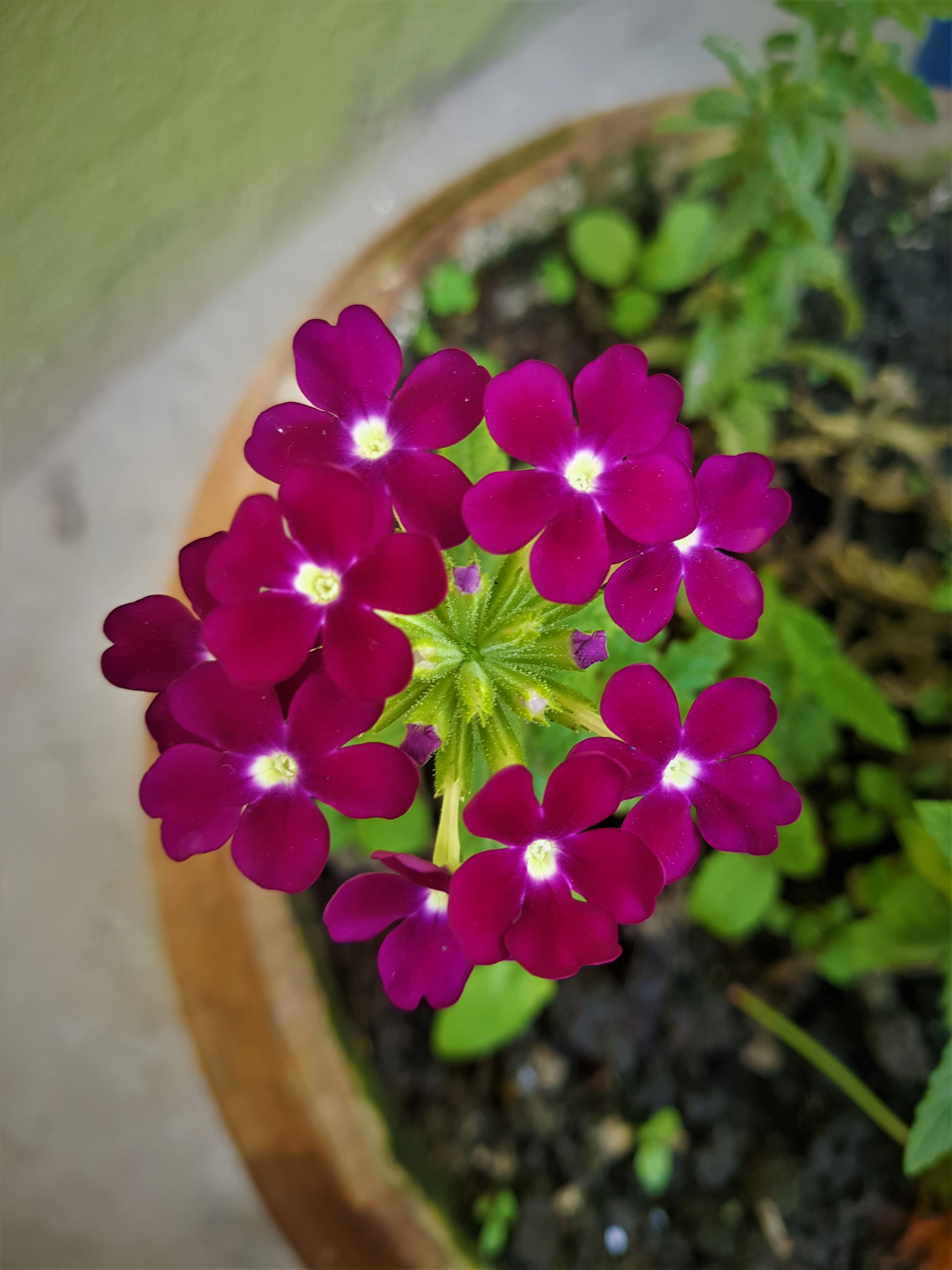
Verbena obsession cascade pink

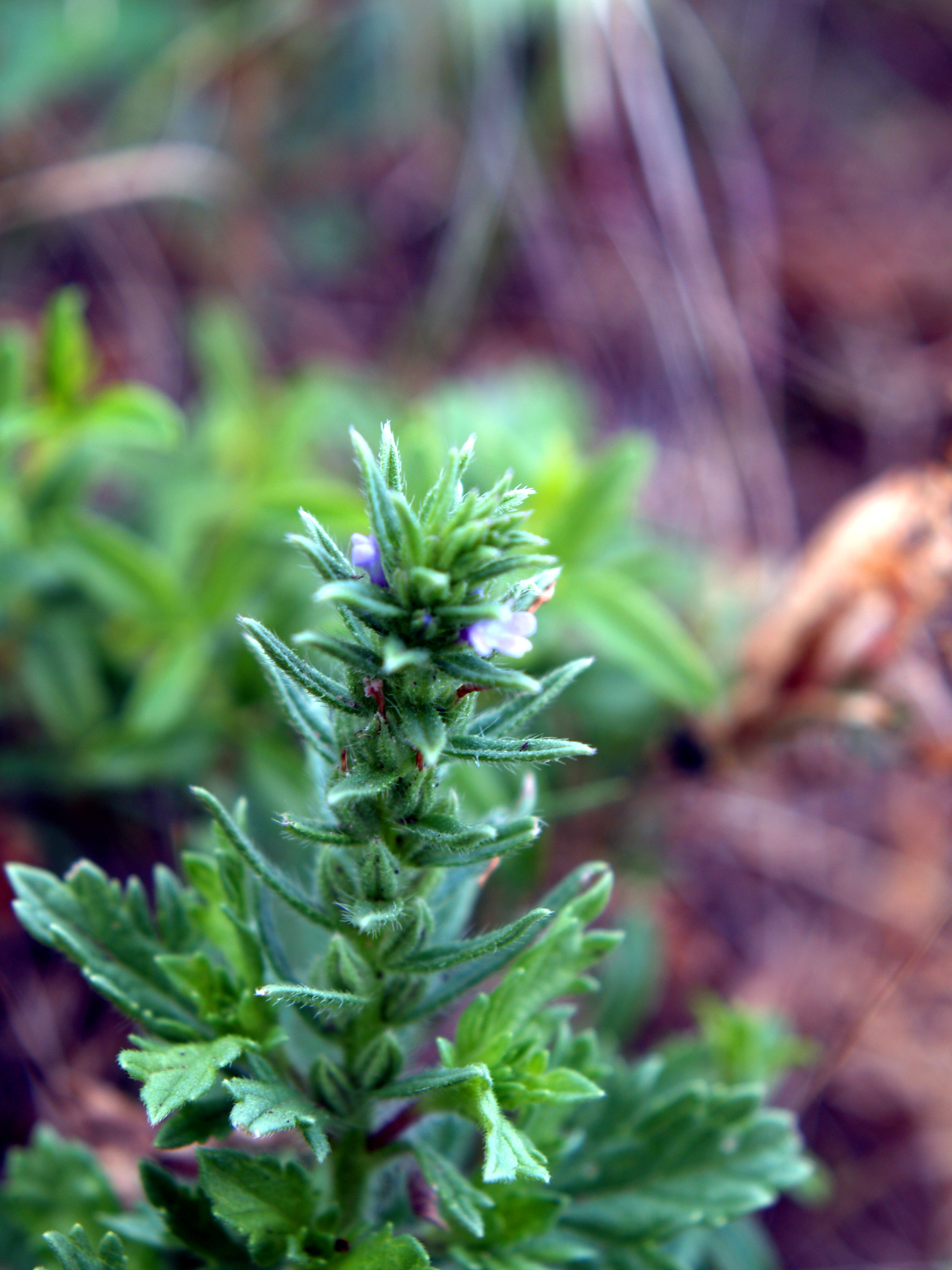
Large-bracted Vervain (V. bracteata)

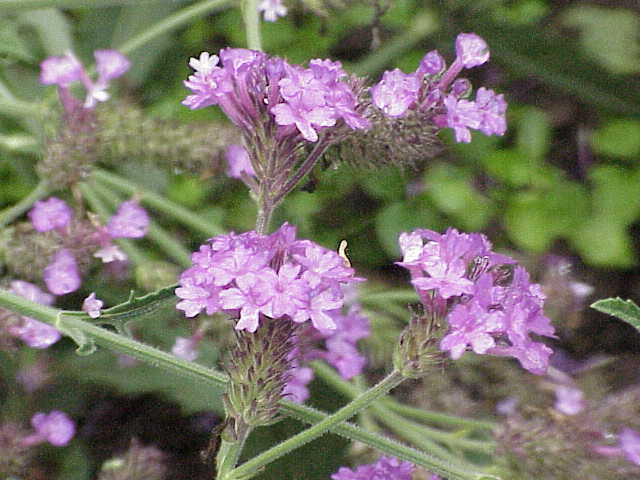
Verbena rigida

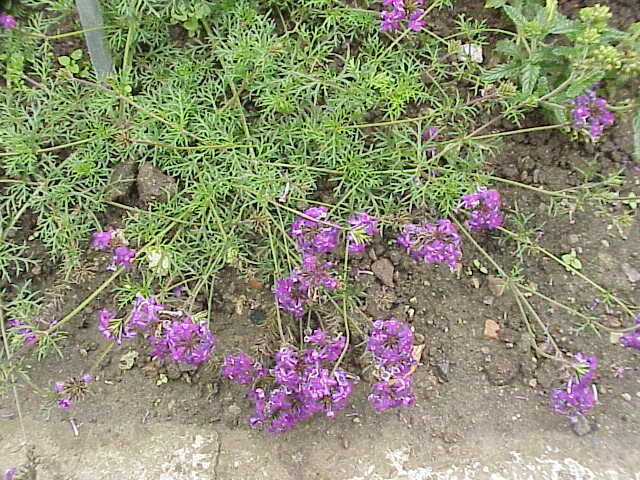
Verbena speciosa

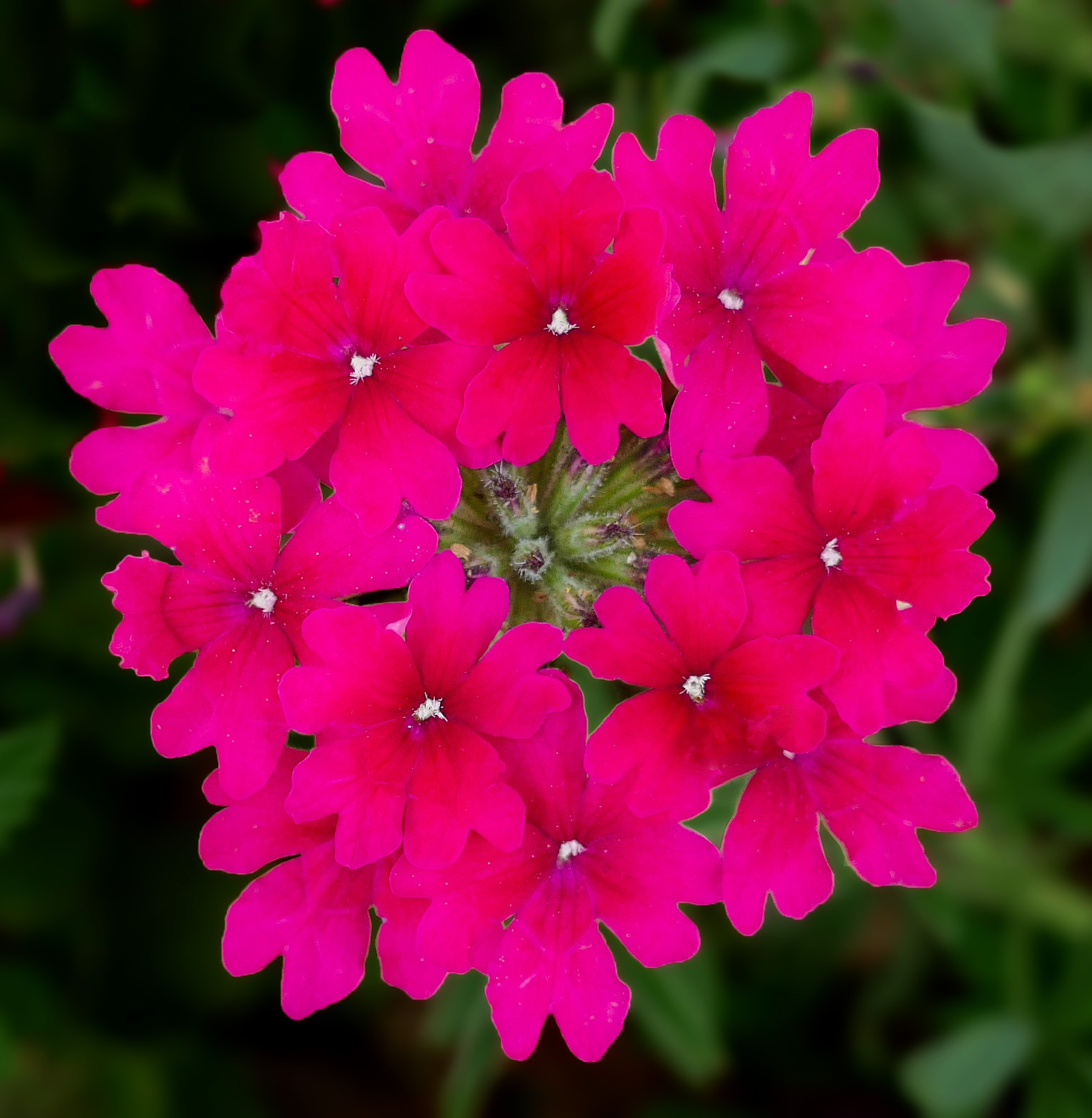
Superbena® Scarlet Star or Superbena® Raspberry

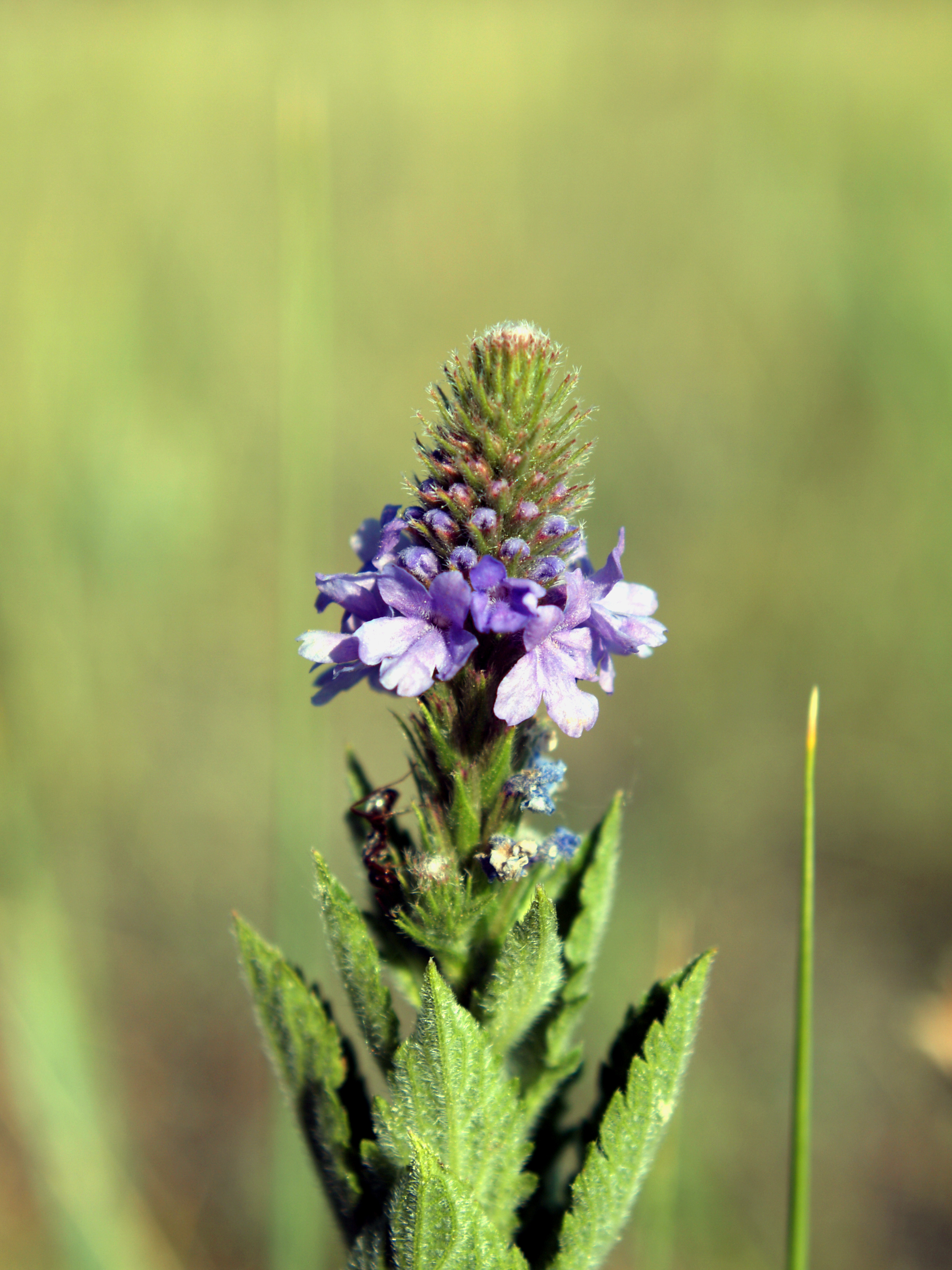
Hoary Vervain (V. stricta)
