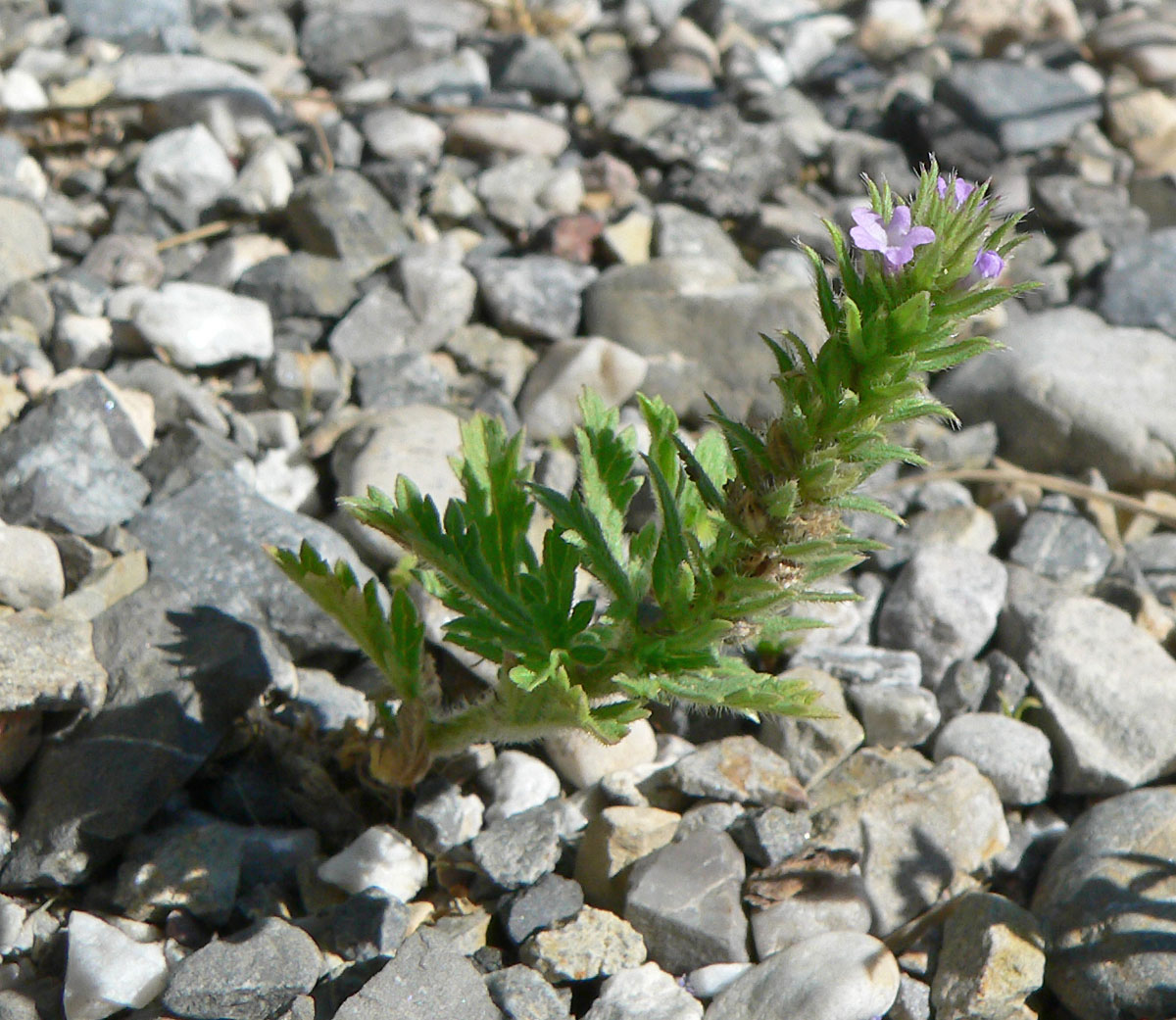

Scientific classification
- Kingdom: Plantae
- Clade: Tracheophytes
- Clade: Angiosperms
- Clade: Eudicots
- Clade: Asterids
- Order: Lamiales
- Family: Verbenaceae
- Genus: Verbena
- Species: V. bracteata

Binomial name
- Verbena bracteata Cav. ex Lag. & Rodr.

= Verbena bracteata =

Species of flowering plant

Verbena bracteata is a species of verbena known by the common names bracted vervain, bigbract verbena, prostrate vervain, and carpet vervain. It is native to North America where it is widespread, occurring throughout the continent except for northern Canada and southern Mexico. It occurs in many types of habitat, especially disturbed areas. It typically blooms between the months of May and October. This annual or perennial herb produces several hairy, spreading stems up to 30 centimeters long forming a low mat on the ground. The hairy leaves are toothed or lobed. The inflorescence is a spike of flowers which is dense with long, pointed, leaflike bracts each up to 8 millimeters long. Each small tubular flower is about half a centimeter wide and white to pale purple in color.
