= Verbena menthifolia =

Conservation status
- Secure (NatureServe)

Scientific classification
- Kingdom: Plantae
- Clade: Tracheophytes
- Clade: Angiosperms
- Clade: Eudicots
- Clade: Asterids
- Order: Lamiales
- Family: Verbenaceae
- Genus: Verbena
- Species: V. menthifolia

Binomial name
- Verbena menthifolia Benth.

Species of flowering plant

Verbena menthifolia is a species of verbena known by the common name mint-leaved vervain or mint vervain. It is native to the southwestern United States and northern Mexico, where it occurs in many types of open, dry habitat such as desert scrub. This perennial herb produces one or more rough-haired, erect stems up to about 75 centimeters in maximum height. The hairy leaves are a few centimeters long and are divided near the base into a few narrow lobes which have serrated edges. The inflorescence is made up of one to three narrow, erect spikes of flowers up to 30 centimeters long. The flowers are spaced, not densely packed on the slender spike. Each flower has a small purple corolla 2 or 3 millimeters wide.

== Conservation ==
As of December 2024, the conservation group NatureServe listed Verbena menthifolia as Secure (G5) worldwide. This status was last reviewed on 16 January 1990. The group did not assess at the national or subnational level.
