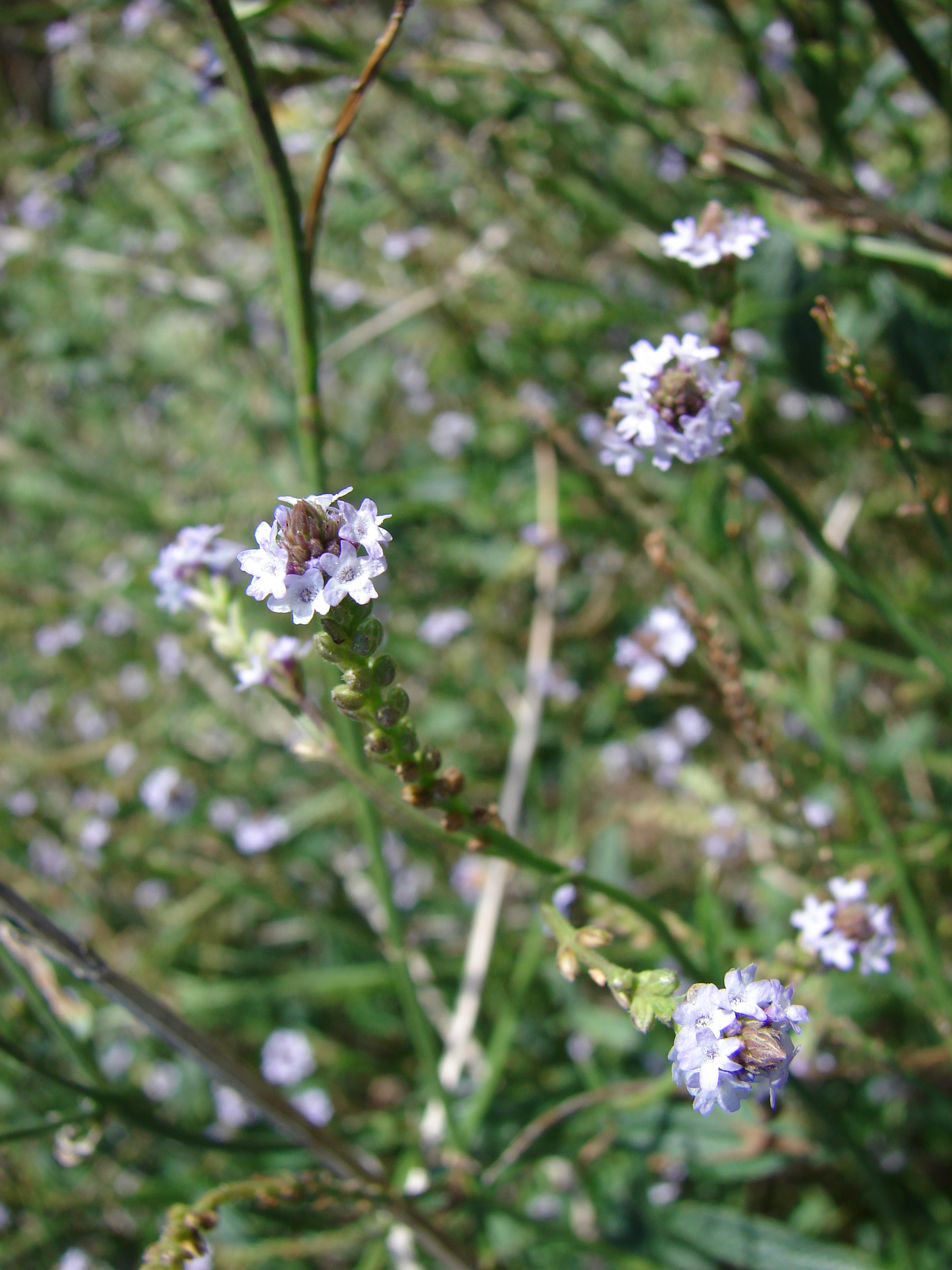
- growing as a weed on Midway Atoll

Scientific classification
- Kingdom: Plantae
- Clade: Tracheophytes
- Clade: Angiosperms
- Clade: Eudicots
- Clade: Asterids
- Order: Lamiales
- Family: Verbenaceae
- Genus: Verbena
- Species: V. litoralis

Binomial name
- Verbena litoralis Kunth

= Verbena litoralis =

Species of plant

Verbena litoralis is a species of verbena known by the common names seashore vervain and Brazilian vervain, and in Hawaiian, ōwī. It is native to the Americas from Mexico south through Central and South America to Argentina and Chile. It is present throughout the world as an introduced species and in some areas a noxious weed. It is naturalized in the contiguous United States, Puerto Rico, Hawaii, Italy, Spain, South Africa, Mauritius, the Galápagos Islands, Australia, Easter Island, French Polynesia, Japan, New Zealand, and other places. It grows in many types of habitat, including disturbed and cultivated areas.

This perennial herb produces one or more hairless or slightly bristly erect stems growing 40 centimeters to well over one meter tall. The rough-haired leaves are somewhat lance-shaped and have serrated edges, the blades measuring up to 10 centimeters in length. The inflorescence is made up of one to eleven erect spikes of flowers which are dense at the tip and more open on the lower part. Each small tubular flower has a purple corolla about half a centimeter wide.
