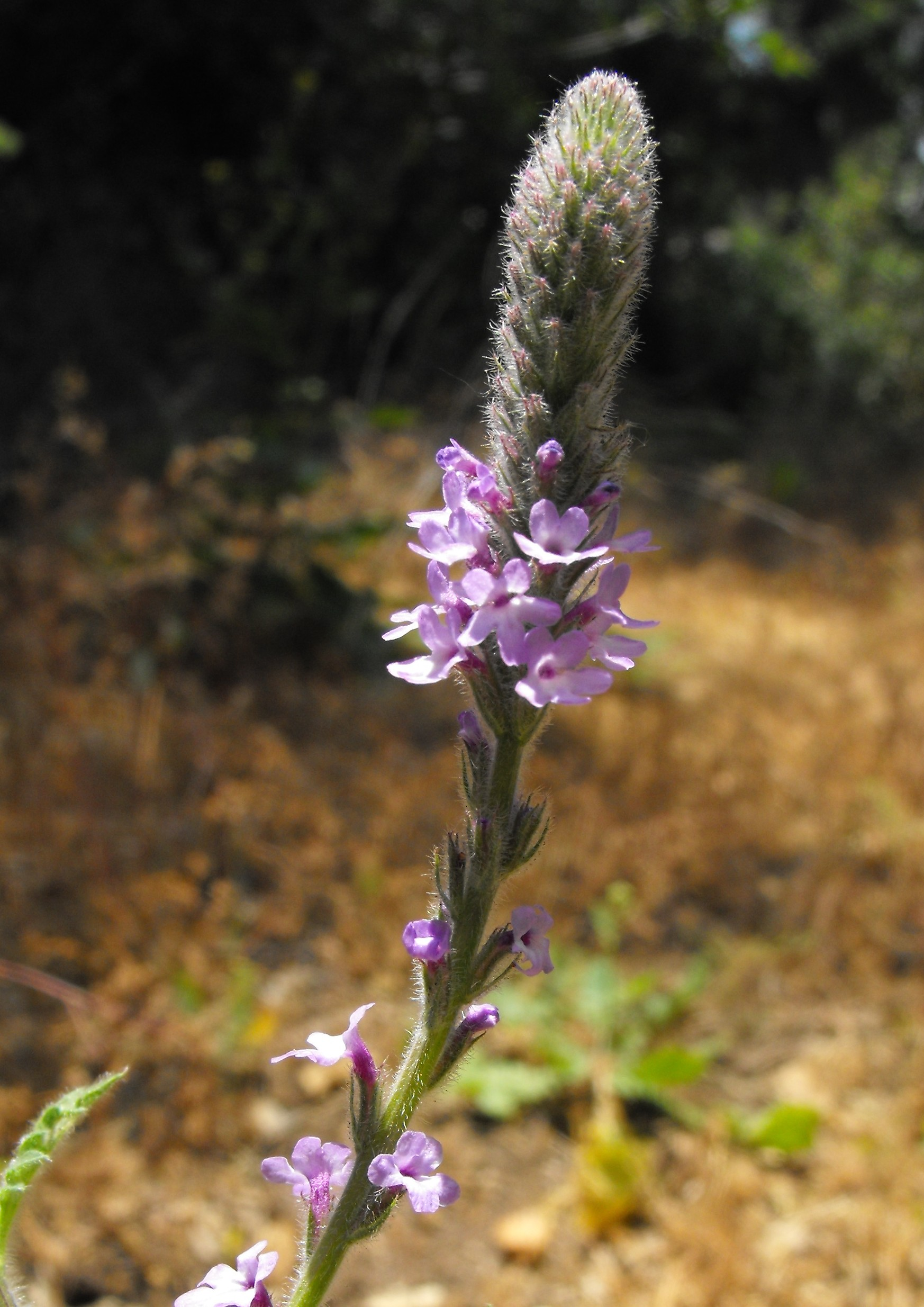

Scientific classification
- Kingdom: Plantae
- Clade: Tracheophytes
- Clade: Angiosperms
- Clade: Eudicots
- Clade: Asterids
- Order: Lamiales
- Family: Verbenaceae
- Genus: Verbena
- Species: V. lasiostachys

Binomial name
- Verbena lasiostachys Link

= Verbena lasiostachys =

Species of flowering plant

Verbena lasiostachys is a species of verbena known by the common name western vervain.

It is native to western North America from Oregon, throughout California, to Baja California. It is widespread and occurs in many types of habitat, including California chaparral and woodlands and the Sierra Nevada. It is also found in disturbed areas, where it thrives despite trying conditions.

== Description ==
Verbena lasiostachys is perennial herb produces one or more hairy, decumbent to erect stems up to 80 centimeters long. The hairy leaves are toothed or lobed and have short, winged petioles.

The inflorescence is made up of one to three spikes of flowers which are dense at the tip and more open on the lower part. Each small tubular flower has a hairy calyx of sepals and a purple corolla no more than half a centimeter wide.
