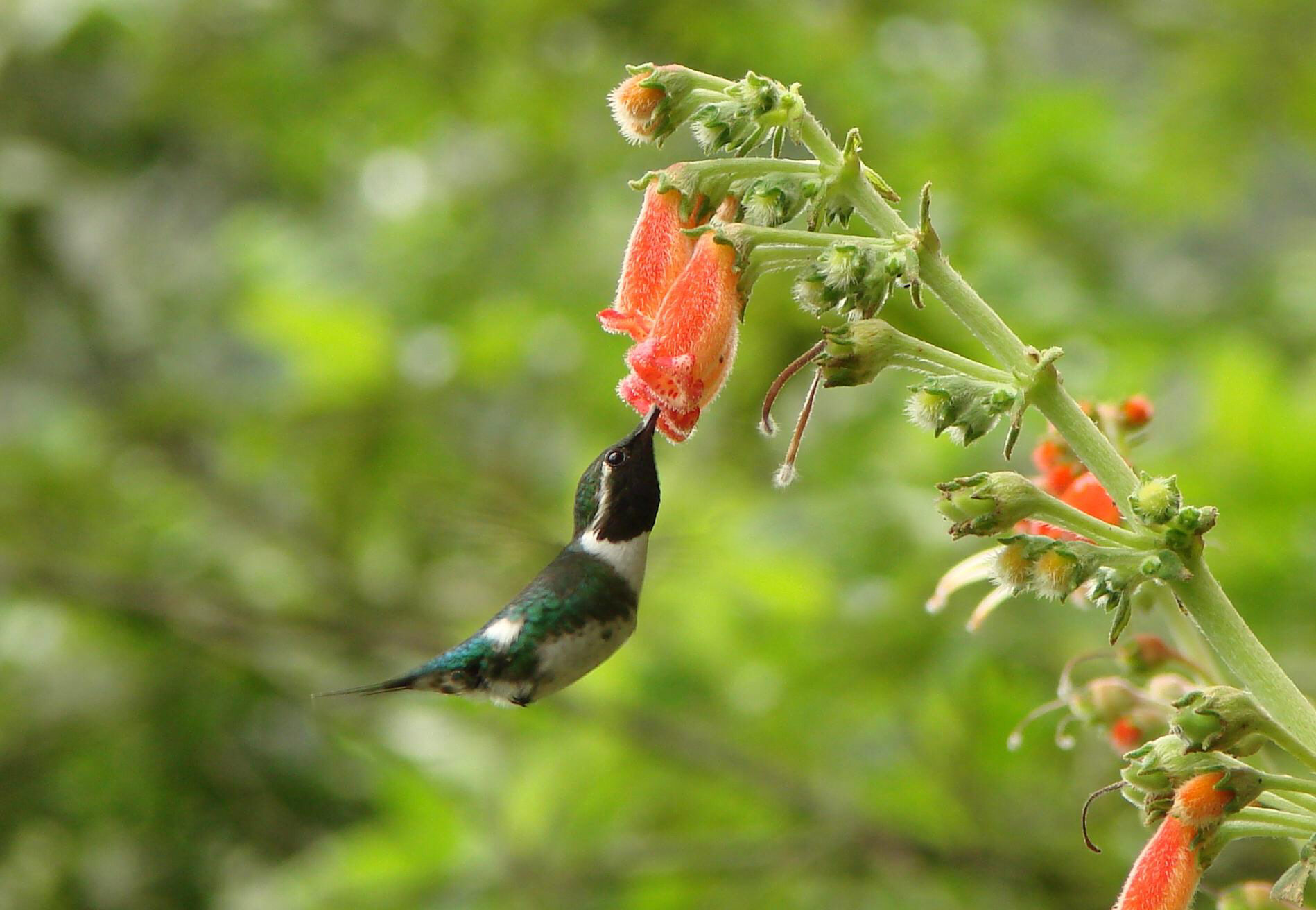
- Female Esmeraldas woodstar feeding on Kohleria spicata in Ayampe, Ecuador.

Conservation status
- Vulnerable (IUCN 3.1)
- CITES Appendix II

Scientific classification
- Kingdom: Animalia
- Phylum: Chordata
- Class: Aves
- Order: Apodiformes
- Family: Trochilidae
- Genus: Chaetocercus
- Species: C. berlepschi

Binomial name
- Chaetocercus berlepschi Simon, 1889
- Range of the Esmeraldas woodstar

Synonyms
- Acestrura berlepschi (Simon, 1889)

= Esmeraldas woodstar =

Species of bird

The Esmeraldas woodstar (Chaetocercus berlepschi) is a rare, neotropical species of hummingbird in the family Trochilidae. There are six different species in the woodstar genus. Most of them are poorly studied due to their small size, extremely similar resemblance to each other, and rarity. Esmeraldas woodstars are one of the smallest bird species. They are sexually dimorphic. The main difference between sexes is that males have a bright purple throat. Esmeraldas woodstars are found only on the Pacific coast of west Ecuador in semi-deciduous to evergreen forests. They feed on the nectar of flowering shrubs and trees. The main threat to this species is deforestation. Esmeraldas woodstars are Vulnerable and require habitat protection.

== Taxonomy ==
The Esmeraldas woodstar belongs to the family Trochilidae and the genus Chaetocercus. There are six species in this genus: the Esmeraldas woodstar (C. berlepschi), the white-bellied woodstar (C. mulsant), the little woodstar (C. bombus), the Santa Marta woodstar (C. astreans), the gorgeted woodstar (C. heliodor), and the rufous-shafted woodstar (C. jourdanii). Previously, these species (besides the rufous-shafted woodstar) were categorized in the genus Acestrura. They were reclassified into the same genus due to their extremely similar morphology. Overall, the Chaetocercus genus is poorly understood. Woodstars are difficult to study because of their small size and elusive behaviour, particularly during non-breeding season.

== Description ==
At only about 6 centimeters long, Esmeraldas woodstars are among the smallest species of hummingbird. Researchers recently found Esmeraldas woodstars at twelve new locations and collected the first female specimens of the species. Previously, the specimens labelled as female were misgendered juvenile males.

Female Esmeraldas woodstars have yellowish-brown underparts and a dark greyish-black back, head, and tail. They have green patches on the sides of their chest and the center of their tail. Their tails also have small, cinnamon-rufous tips. They have a white postocular stripe (differently coloured feathers extending from the eye down to the neck). Little woodstars inhabit the same region as Esmeraldas woodstars, and the females of both species appear very similar to each other. Distinguishing features of little woodstar females are their green sheen, cinnamon postocular stripe which is short and narrow (rather than long and wide), cinnamon underparts, and larger size.

Male Esmeraldas woodstars have green upperparts with a blue sheen, white underparts, a white postocular stripe, a green chest band, a forked tail and a bright purple throat. Male little woodstars also appear very similar to male Esmeraldas woodstars. In contrast, male little woodstars have ruby-pink throats and are greener on both their upper- and underparts.

Male juvenile Esmeraldas woodstars were previously misidentified by researchers as adult females because of their similar appearance and extremely small gonads. Male juveniles have white underparts, a yellowish-brown throat with a few purple feathers, and a distinctive rounded, green tail with a rufous-cinnamon base and pale cinnamon to whitish tips. Young Esmeraldas woodstars that are still nest-bound have yellowish-brown underparts with green and cinnamon wings. Male Esmeraldas woodstars that have recently left their nest are similar to male juveniles but without the purple feathers on their throat.

== Distribution and habitat ==
Esmeraldas woodstars are found only on the Pacific coast of western Ecuador. They occupy a small range which has been mostly deforested. Their range overlaps with the little woodstar. Esmeraldas woodstars inhabit semi-deciduous to evergreen moist forests. They are found anywhere between sea level and 750 meters in elevation. This includes both low elevation areas which have been disturbed by human settlement, and undisturbed, high elevation areas.

== Behaviour and ecology ==
=== Vocalizations and wing sounds ===
Esmeraldas woodstars have been recorded making mechanical noises with their wings during mating. These wing sounds are similar to the "buzzing" of a large insect. They also make high-pitched chirps in quick succession, especially while feeding in a patch of flowers.

- Vocalizations and wing sounds

=== Reproduction ===
Esmeraldas woodstars breed from November to April near the coast at low elevations of 30 to 350 meters. These areas are typically developed with cattle ranching and agriculture, but are adjacent to large forest patches. Occasionally, they reproduce directly in mature moist forests. This species displays a specific mating behaviour. It begins with a male defending his perch at the top of a small dead tree. When a female arrives, the male flies directly up above the perch until he is completely out of sight. He then drops down to the perch while making mechanical noises with his wings. They make nests out of balsa wood fibers and a variety of Asteraceae seeds. The fibers and seeds are held together by spider webs and camouflaged with lichens. They always build their nests near the tops of small dead trees (about 5 meters tall). These trees are typically near creeks or roads. Esmeraldas woodstars typically lay two eggs at a time. The eggs are small and white.

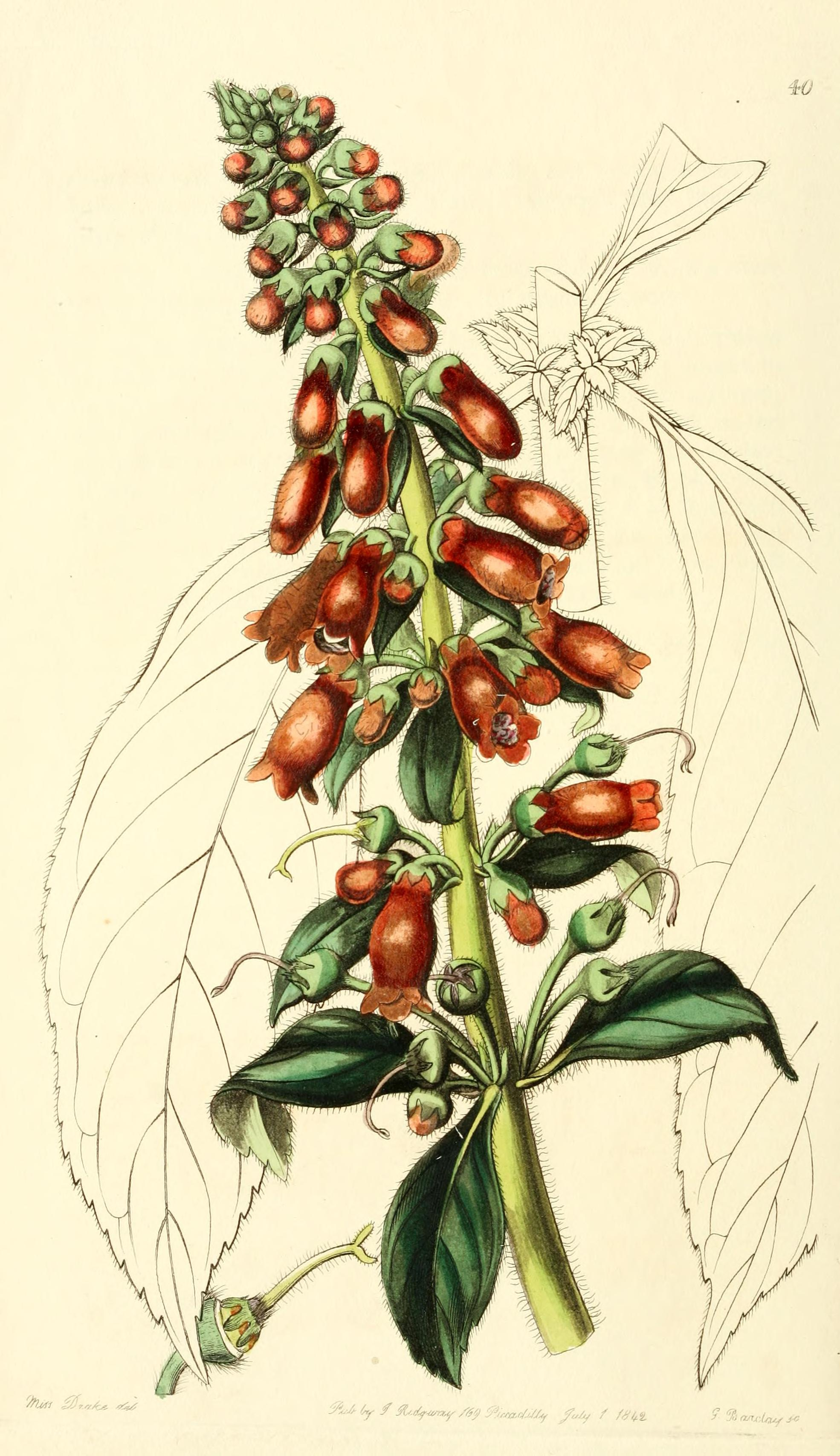
Kohleria spicata

=== Diet ===
The most important flower in the Esmeraldas woodstar diet is the Kohleria spicata. These reddish-orange flowers grow on weedy shrubs. The highest abundance of Esmeraldas woodstars were recorded during the peak season of this flower species (January to March). Esmeraldas woodstars also frequently visit Cornutia pyramidata which are small trees that grow purple flowers. At higher elevations, they feed on the nectar of Psychotria hazennii and Razisea cf. ericae. Flowers of the Razisea genus are medium-sized and form dense clumps, making them ideal for small hummingbirds to efficiently extract their nectar.

=== Threats ===
Deforestation in the lowland humid forests of western Ecuador is the biggest threat to Esmeraldas woodstars. These birds inhabit three fragmented Ecuadorian provinces which were all previously connected: Esmeraldas, Guayas, and Manabí. Esmeraldas woodstars rely on protected areas such as the Machalilla National Park to survive and reproduce. Due to poor wildlife management, disruptive human activity still occurs on this land. While researchers were collecting data on this species, they observed logging, hunting, farming, and human settlements within the protected area.

== Status and conservation ==
The IUCN Red List classifies the Esmeralda woodstar as Vulnerable. They were previously believed to have a population of 250 to 999 individuals. These numbers would deem them almost critically endangered. After an extensive study in 2009, researchers concluded that their population size is likely 1,000 to 3,000. This would make them less threatened than previously thought but still a high priority conservation species. Their population is currently decreasing.

Habitat protection is crucial for Esmeraldas woodstar survival. Research shows that crucial breeding areas for this species include the cities of San José to San Lorenzo and the large forest patches adjacent to them. Machalilla National Park is one of the only areas protecting this species from habitat loss, but it needs better management to be successful. In 2014, a 38-acre nature reserve was created in Ayampe by Fundación de Conservación Jocotoco, Rainforest Trust, the American Bird Conservancy, and the local Las Tunas community. Their goal is to protect 700 acres of land.

== Relationship to humans ==
Las Tunas is a local community on the coast of Ecuador and a crucial breeding habitat for Esmeraldas woodstars. The Las Tunas community calls this species "estrellita", meaning "little star" in Spanish. The 38-acre reserve in Ayampe benefits both Esmeraldas woodstars and the Las Tunas community. The local residents depend on water from Rio Ayampe. Preventing deforestation and development of this land ensures that water from the river is available for human-use. Additionally, over 15,000 trees have been planted on the reserve. Many of them are pechiche trees (Vitex gigantea) which bloom small purple flowers. Esmeraldas woodstars feed on this flower and the Las Tunas people harvest the tree's fruit. Because of the abundance of ripe pechiche fruit every spring, they host an annual festival with candy made from the juice. The community also organizes beach clean-ups where children collect trash along the coast, making this area one of the cleanest in the country. Because of the huge impact the Esmeraldas woodstar has had on Las Tunas, the locals now refer to the species as "their" bird, and Ecuador has declared the area protected for tourism.
