= Leopold Trattinnick =

Austrian botanist and mycologist (1764–1849)

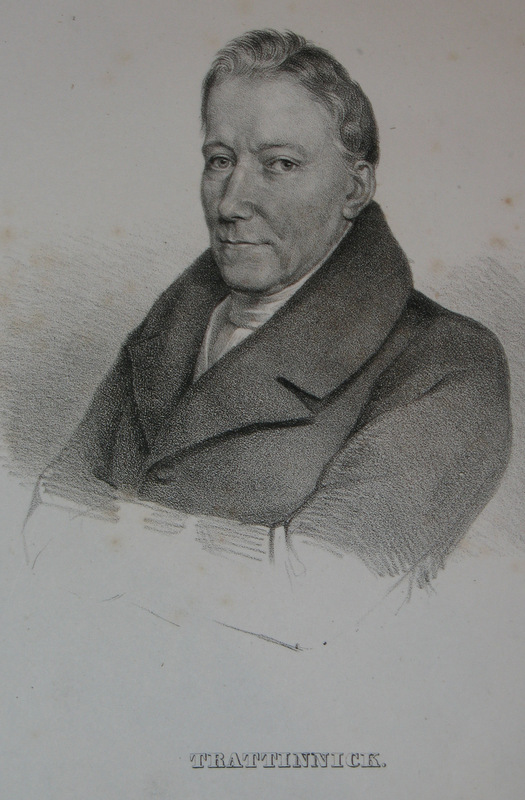
- Born: 26 May 1764; Klosterneuburg, Lower Austria
- Died: 24 January 1849 (aged 84); Vienna, Austria
- Known for: Taxonomy; Botany
- Scientific career
- Fields: Botany
- Author abbrev. (botany): Tratt.

Leopold Trattinnick (26 May 1764 in Klosterneuburg – 24 January 1849 in Vienna) was an Austrian botanist and mycologist. He was a curator of the Royal Natural History collection in Vienna. He published several mycological and other botanical works. Most of these works were illustrated with engravings and many of them were hand coloured (pre-colour printing). He also gave out collections of wax replicas of species of fungi and later sponges.

== Biography ==
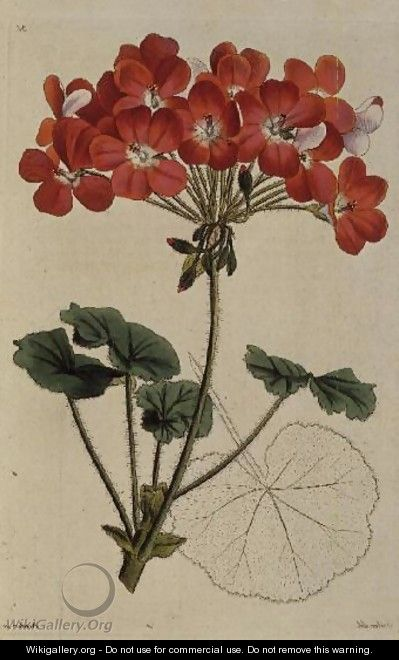
A painted illustration of a Pelargonium from Trattinnick's book 'Neu Arten von Pelargonium', c.1825-34

Leopold Trattinnick was born on 26 May 1764 near Vienna to a wealthy and influential family.

He originally began to study law but his interests in nature grew and he started studying Science and divided his time amongst the fields of entomology, mineralogy and botany. His main area of Interest was mycology and spermatophytes.

In 1797, he published 'Anleitung zur Cultur der ächten Baumwolle in Österreich' (translated as 'Introduction to the culture of true cotton in Austria'). It was his first botanical publication. This was followed by 'Genera Plantarum Methodo Naturali Disposita', in 1802, which was a proposal for a natural arrangement of some plant genera.

Between 1804 and 1806, he published several works about mushrooms (mycology), including 'Fungi Austriaci'. He also staged an exhibition with wax sculpted mushroom replicas, called the 'Mycological Cabinet'. A second collection (with edible sponges) was made in 1830. The Mycological Cabinet was numbered in Arabic numerals (1-42). The second collection of sponges is numbered with letters (A-FF). In 1809, he published 'The edible sponges of the Empire of Austria'. Several places still have these wax collections including the 'Museo Civico di storia naturale' in Trieste, Italy (only up to no. 18), the portrait collection of the National Library in Vienna, which has wax models from both series, the University of Veterinary Medicine in Vienna, which also has wax models from both series and the 'Department of Botany' in the Hungarian National Museum in Budapest.

Between 1805 and 1819, seven volumes of 'Thesaurus Botanicus' were published with botanical Illustrations (which include works from Ignace Strenzel (or Ignaz Stremel) (professor at the Vienna Academy, 1786–1832), Franz Reinelli (a flower specialist at the Royal Vienna porcelain works, 1785–1812) and Johann Buchberger from Vienna. It contained 80 plates.

He did not have an official botanical position until 1806 when he became the “Landschafts-Phytographen von Niederösterreich”,(plant illustrator of the landscape of Lower Austria).

In 1809, the Kaiser of the Austro-Hungarian Empire, Emperor Francis I, appointed him “Kustos des K.k. Hof- Naturalienkabinetts” (which translated means 'Custodian of the Royal Natural History Collections'). He held this position until 1835/36. 'Kaiserlichen Hof-Naturalienkabinett' is now the Naturhistorisches Museum Wien in Vienna.

Whilst being a curator, he organised the specimens of various plant genera including Theophrasta, Sophora, Hermannia and Psoralea. These were collected by Nikolaus Joseph von Jacquin.

Between 1811 and 1818, he published 'Archiv der Gewächskunde' (Archives of the Greenhouse Customer). This two-volume work included 250 engravings of plants. The copper plates included domestic and foreign plants in any order. It was not a popular piece of work as it had many copies of current illustrations.

Between 1811 and 1816, he published "Observationes Botanicae" (in 4 Fascimila). Another piece of work with very low sales.

Between 1812 and 1818, he published 'Arch Gewächsk' (Archiv der Gewächskunde) Wein.

Between 1812 and 1822, he published 'Auswahl vorzüglich schöner, seltener, berühmter, und sonst sehr merkwürdiger Gartenpflanzen, in getreuen Abbildungen nebst Erläuterungen über ihre Charakteristik, Verwandschaft, Klassification, Geschichte, Verwendung, Cultur, und ästhetischen Ansichten' (translation: Selection of Exquisitely Beautiful, Rare, Famous and Otherwise Very Strange Garden Plants, in faithful pictures together with explanations of their characteristics, relationships/ kinship, classification, history, use, culture and aesthetic properties). It included 219 engraved plates, 218 of them hand-coloured. A set sold in 1999 for £9,775

In 1812, all known species in the genus Hosta were grouped together by Trattinnick, and named in honour of his fellow Austrian Nicholas Thomas Host, who was a botanist and physician at the court of Emperor Frances I of Austria. It was first thought that the name was invalid, as a Verbena (now known as Cornutia) had already been named "Hosta", but Linnaeus then re-classified the plant as a 'Verbena'. In 1905, the International Botanical Congress voted that the name 'Hosta' could be used.

Between 1816 and 1822 he published two volumes of the 'Flora der Oesterreichischen Kaiserthumes' (Flora of the Austrian Empire), but the complete work was never finished. The illustrations were taken from his archive. The text is partially filled with poetic verse as well as botanical observations.

In 1816, Trattinick published and described Schmidtia subtilis in 'Flora des Osterreichischen Kaiserthumes' Volume 1 Issue 12, t.451. Specimens of this taxon were sent to Trattinick by Count Berchtold. This was later classified as a synonym of Coleanthus subtilis.

In 1819, he published 'Oesterreichischer Blumenkranz', (Flower Wreaths of Austria) which was described as “not botany in verse, but pure botanical poetry, representing the work of the important Austrian botanist; 200 plants from the white lily to the sharp stonecrop poetically imagined”.

In 1821, he published 'Botanisches Taschenbuch oder Conservatorium aller Resultate Ideen und Ansichten aus dem ganzen Umfange der Gewächskunde', Vienna, (translated as Botanical Notebook or conservatory of all resulting ideas and views from the whole range of Botany). It did not sell very well and only 1 volume was published.

In 1823, Trattinick changed the name of a species of rose. It was originally named Rosa microphylla by Dr. William Roxburgh (1751–1815) in 1820, because René Louiche Desfontaines had previously applied the name 'microphylla' to an unrelated European species in 1798. It became Rosa Roxburghii. Trattinick published this name change in 'Rosacearum monographia' page233 in 1823. The 'Monograph of the Rose Family' covered generic and species descriptions of plants in the rose family, although it was not illustrated.

Between 1823 and 1824, four volumes of Synodus Botanica were published with illustrations or scientific drawings by 'Franz Nobleman Portenschlag-Ledermayer'.

In 1825, Trattinnick published 'Genera Nova Plantarum Iconibus Observationibusque Illustrata', which appeared in 24 fascicles. The illustrations were not coloured but were very highly regarded.

Between 1825 and 1834, four volumes of 'Neue Arten von Pelargonien deutschen Ursprunges' were published. They described 400 hybrids of Pelargoniums from Germany, all of which were named or renamed in Latin. Before 1843 he published 2 more volumes of the same title. Which included 264 illustrations, as a full-page engraving which was hand-coloured. In his later publications, some of the plants were illustrated by single flowers and several plants were included on a page.

In 1826, as the curator of botany, Trattinick wrote in his annual report “The botanical heritage of Ferdinand Bauer, who died in Hietzing in March of this year, consisting of 113 small parcels of dried plants from New Holland, the Island of Timor the Island of Norfolk, and the Cape of Good Hope, and of 1876 plates of drawings of them, sketched in pencil, which His Highest Imperial Majesty had purchased, has been handed over to me. K.K. Museum on the last of October 1926. Leopold Trattinick, Curator” (which as translated by Riedl-Dorn, in 1989).

In 1828, Trattinick, on seeing Rafflesia (a species of parasitic flowering plant), wrote that the plant should be assigned to a special taxonomic category called Vegetablische Verrucktheiten, or “Vegetable Craziness.”

Among all his varied publications, Trattinnick is credited with the original Latin descriptions of around 405 plant names.

Although, some of his early publications can be found under the name "Leopold Trattinick" (with a single "n"), the 17th edition of the "Zander Hand dictionary of plant names" has the more accurate spelling "Trattinnick".

A complete list of his publications can be found in 'Wurzbach's Encyclopedia' Vol. 46, in 1882.

In addition to his scientific published work, he maintained an avid correspondence with foreign and domestic trade scholars and other eminent men, which include Goethe and Alexander von Humboldt. He was a frequent correspondent and friend of Franz Wilibald Schmidt (1764–1796). He was a member of many learned societies and societies.

The Trattinick herbarium is preserved in Vienna.

== Honours ==
The plant genus Trattinnickia of the family Burseraceae, named by Carl Ludwig Willdenow in 1806 was named after him.Burseraceae contains many species of trees and shrubs, which includes the sub-tribes Protieae, Bursereae, and Canarieae. Canarieae is composed of Canarium (75 species and is the largest in this tribe), Dacryodes, Haplolobus, Pseudodacryodes, Rosselia, Santiria, Scutinanthe, and Trattinnickia (with 26 species).

In Klosterneuburg, (his birth town) in Lower Austria, there is a road named after him.

== Selected bibliography ==
- Guide to outlaw culture of cotton in Austria. Vienna 1797
- Genera plantarum methodo naturali disposita. Vindobonae (Vienna) 1802
- Fungi Austriaci, iconibus illustrati. Vienna 1804-1806
- The edible sponges of the Austrian Empire. 1809, 2nd ed. 1830
- Archives of a greenhouse customer. Vienna 1811–1818.
- Flora of the Austrian Empire. 1816–1822.
- Thesaurus botanicus. Vienna 1805, 2nd ed. 1819
- Rosacearum Monographia. 1823–1824. (ISBN 978-1-275-59202-5)
- Genera plantarum nova iconibus observationesque illustrata. Self-Verlag, 1825 (24 copper plates).
- New types of geraniums German origin. 1825–1843.
