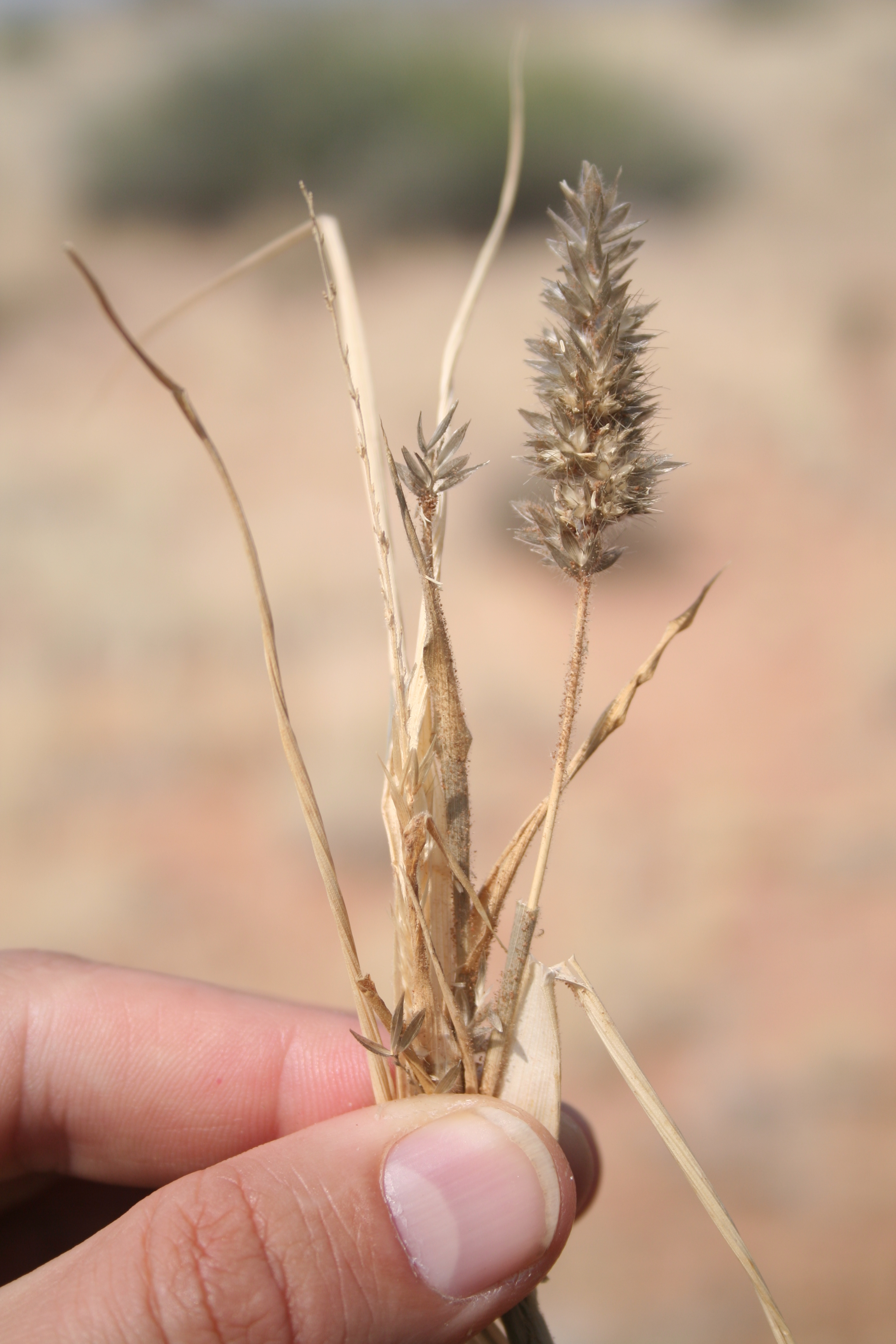
- Schmidtia kalahariensis

Scientific classification
- Kingdom: Plantae
- Clade: Tracheophytes
- Clade: Angiosperms
- Clade: Monocots
- Clade: Commelinids
- Order: Poales
- Family: Poaceae
- Subfamily: Chloridoideae
- Tribe: Eragrostideae
- Subtribe: Cotteinae
- Genus: Schmidtia; Steud. ex J.A.Schmidt. 1852, conserved name, not Moench 1802 nor Tratt. 1816

Type species
- Schmidtia pappophoroides Steud. ex J.A.Schmidt.

Synonyms
- Antoschmidtia Steud., Syn. Pl. Glumac. 1: 199 (1854)

= Schmidtia =

Genus of grasses

Schmidtia is a genus of Asian and African plants in the grass family.

The genus name of Schmidtia is in honour of Franz Wilibald Schmidt (1875–1949), who was a Bohemian botanist.

== Species ==
As accepted by Kew;

- Schmidtia kalahariensis Stent - Chad, Sudan, Angola, Namibia, Botswana, South Africa
- Schmidtia pappophoroides Steud. ex J.A.Schmidt - arid and semiarid parts of Africa from Mauritania to Egypt to South Africa, and also Pakistan

Formerly included; Several names have been coined with the name Schmidtia but are now regarded as better suited to other genera (Coleanthus and Tolpis)

- Schmidtia capensis - Tolpis capensis
- Schmidtia subtilis - Coleanthus subtilis
- Schmidtia utriculata - Coleanthus subtilis
- Schmidtia utriculosa - Coleanthus subtilis
