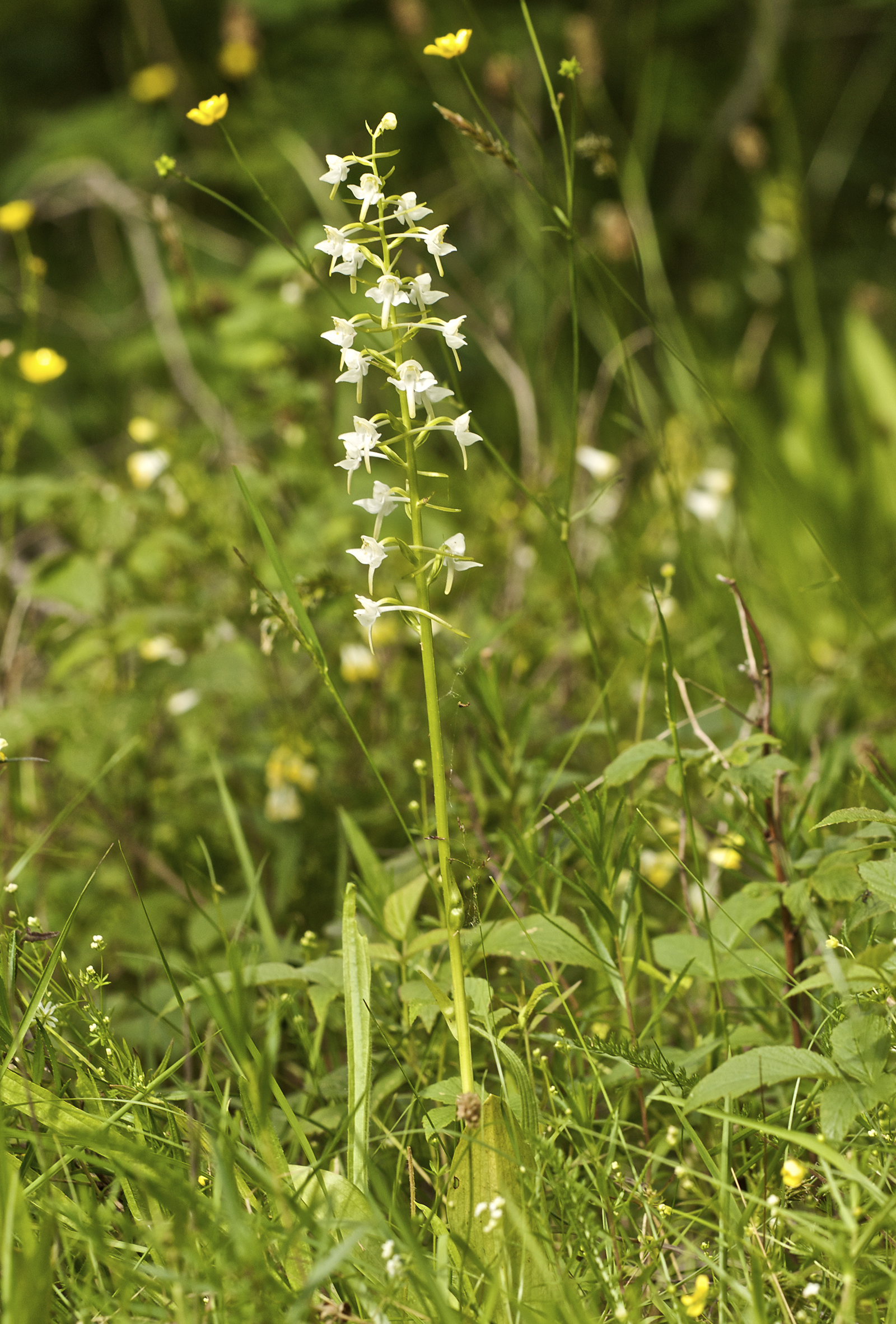

Scientific classification
- Kingdom: Plantae
- Clade: Tracheophytes
- Clade: Angiosperms
- Clade: Monocots
- Order: Asparagales
- Family: Orchidaceae
- Subfamily: Orchidoideae
- Genus: Platanthera
- Species: P. chlorantha

Binomial name
- Platanthera chlorantha (Custer) Rchb.

Synonyms
- Orchis chlorantha Custer (basionym); Habenaria chlorantha (Custer) Bab.; Orchis montana F.W.Schmidt; Orchis virescens Zollik. ex Gaud.; Platanthera montana (F.W.Schmidt) Rchb.f.; Habenaria montana T.Durand & Schinz; Habenaria montana (F.W.Schmidt) Druce; Platanthera chlorantha var. grandiflora M.Schulze

= Platanthera chlorantha =

Greater butterfly-orchid

Species of orchid

Platanthera chlorantha, commonly known as greater butterfly-orchid, is a species of flowering plant in the orchid family. It can be found throughout Europe and Morocco. The name Platanthera is derived from Greek, meaning "broad anthers", while the species name, chlorantha, means "green-flowered".

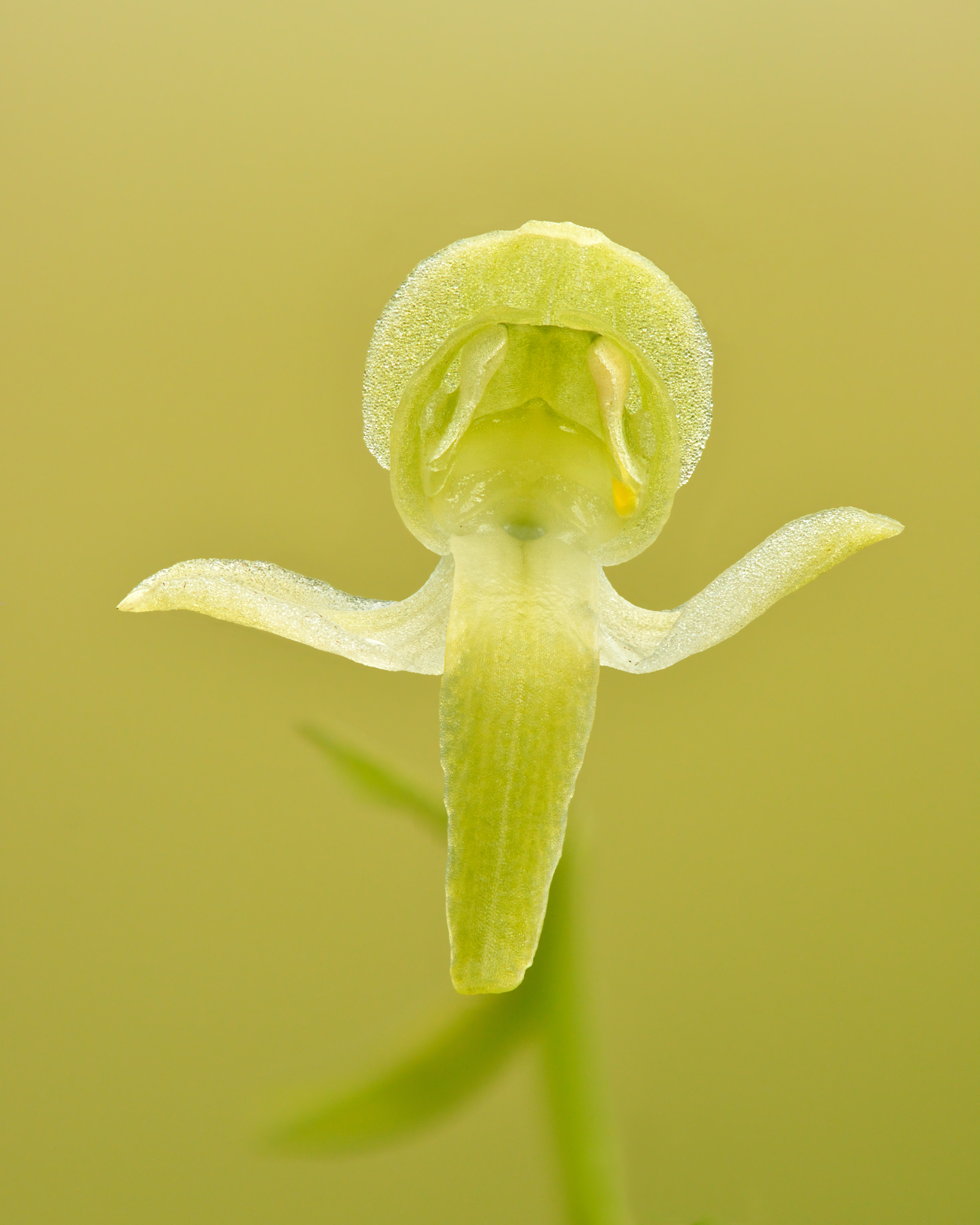
Flower

Greater butterfly-orchid is similar to lesser butterfly-orchid, Platanthera bifolia, which is about the same size, but with smaller flowers. Greater butterfly-orchid is a herbaceous perennial of medium height. Its leaves are broad, shiny and elliptical, with a large pair at the base, and much smaller, more lanceolate leaves up the stem. The flowers are greenish-white, scented of vanilla, with spreading sepals and petals. The lip of the flower is long, narrow and undivided. The flower has a very long spur. The flowers form a rather loose spike. The pollen masses diverge to touch both sides of the pollinating insect. Flowering in Britain is in June to July, but earlier in the south of Europe. The plant is found in woods, open scrub, and grassland including on chalk.

Its world distribution is broadly endemic to Europe: from the British Isles in the west to European Russia and the Caucasus in the east; and from the coastal region of Norway to 65°N, down to the whole of Italy and the Balkans excluding most of Greece. There are scattered outliers in Spain, Turkey, and North Africa. (Codes)
