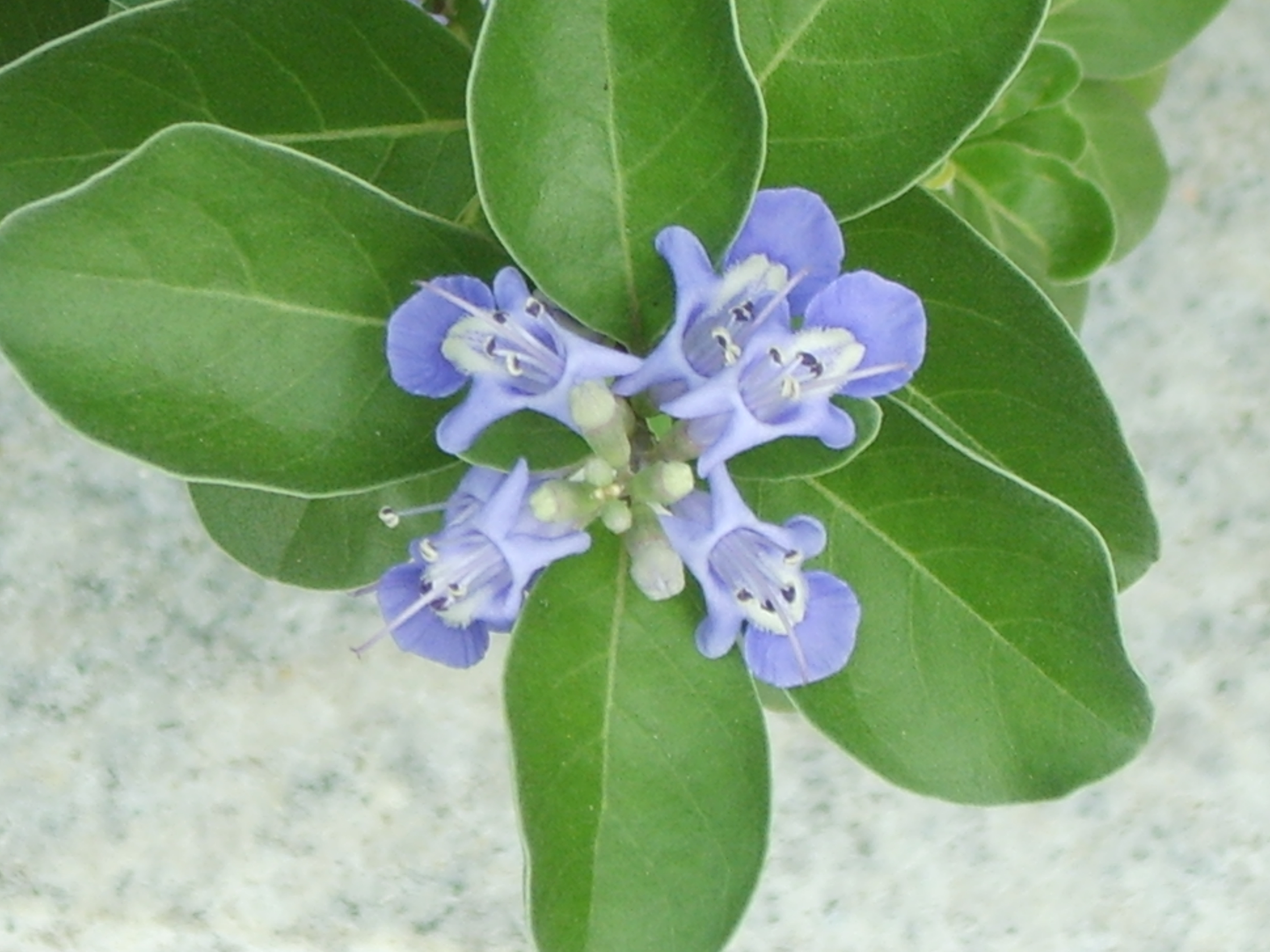

Scientific classification
- Kingdom: Plantae
- Clade: Tracheophytes
- Clade: Angiosperms
- Clade: Eudicots
- Clade: Asterids
- Order: Lamiales
- Family: Lamiaceae
- Genus: Vitex
- Species: V. rotundifolia

Binomial name
- Vitex rotundifolia L.f.

Synonyms
- Vitex ovata Thunb. Vitex repens Blanco; Vitex rotundifolia f. albiflora Y.N.Lee; Vitex rotundifolia f. albiflora S.S.Ying; Vitex rotundifolia f. rosea Satomi; Vitex trifolia subsp. litoralis Steenis; Vitex trifolia var. obovata Benth. Vitex trifolia var. simplicifolia Cham. Vitex trifolia var. unifoliolata Schauer

= Vitex rotundifolia =

Species of vine

Vitex rotundifolia, the roundleaf chastetree or beach vitex, is a species of flowering plant in the sage family Lamiaceae. It is native to seashores throughout the Pacific. Its range includes continents and islands stretching from India east to Hawaii and from Korea south to Australia. This shrub typically grows approximately 1 m in height. It has a sprawling growth habit and produces runners that root regularly at nodes. This rooting pattern allows the plant to spread rapidly. At maturity, V. rotundifolia produces blue-purple flowers that are borne in clusters and ultimately yield small brown-black fruits. Its leaves are rounded at the tips with green upper surfaces and silver lower surfaces. While the plant is a seashore obligate, it grows over a wide latitude range. It has been used for medicinal purposes throughout its native range. More recently, it was imported to the eastern United States where it has become a seashore invasive. Control efforts are presently underway to protect the fragile beach dune ecosystem.

== Description ==
Vitex rotundifolia is a sprawling shrub that can grow as tall as 1.5 m though it typically ranges from 0.5 to 1 m in height. As a product of its rapid nodal rooting, the plant can form dense mats reaching in excess of 10 m from the parent plant.

=== Stems ===
New stems are green, square and fleshy initially before maturing brown and woody. Older, large-diameter stems are covered with heavily fissured bark. Running horizontal stems produce frequent upright branches. Leaves are strongly aromatic, intensifying when crushed.

=== Leaves ===
The majority of leaves are simple, but they can occasionally be palmate trifoliate or 2-leaved. Leaves measure 2 to 6.5 cm in length and 1–4.5 cm in width. Leaf margins are entire. The leaf shape varies from ovate to obovate with acute bases and obtuse apices. Occasionally, leaf apexes are acute or emarginate. Upper leaf surfaces are dark green whereas lower leaf surfaces range in color from silver to white to light green; all leaf surfaces are tomentose. Petiole bases are typically somewhat purple and measure 0 to 1 cm in length. Blades are cupped downward slightly. Leaf veins are lighter green than surrounding tissue.

=== Flowers ===
The flowers are borne in indeterminate panicles that may be terminal or axillary. Inflorescences measure 3 to 7 cm in length. The calyx is cup-shaped and 4 to 4.5 cm long. Flowers are zygomorphic, purple to blue-purple, and short pedunculate. They are two-lipped and funnel-form (measuring 8 mm in length). Four stamens are didynamous and extend beyond the corolla tube (measuring 9 to 10 mm). The style extends beyond the stamens (total length: 12 mm). Pollen is tricolpate. Ovaries consist of two carpels with each containing two single seeded locules.

=== Fruits ===
The fruits are globose drupes that are green while immature but turn yellow and red before maturing to bluish black. The fruits are frequently incorrectly characterized in the literature as "seeds or berries". Each drupe contains a maximum of four seeds though there are usually fewer as a result of seed abortion.

=== Seeds ===
Each seed is encapsulated in a separate compartment. Endosperm is absent. Seeds germinate into tender seedlings that bear two cotyledons and quickly develop two red-margined true leaves. Ploidy level is 2n = 32, 34*.

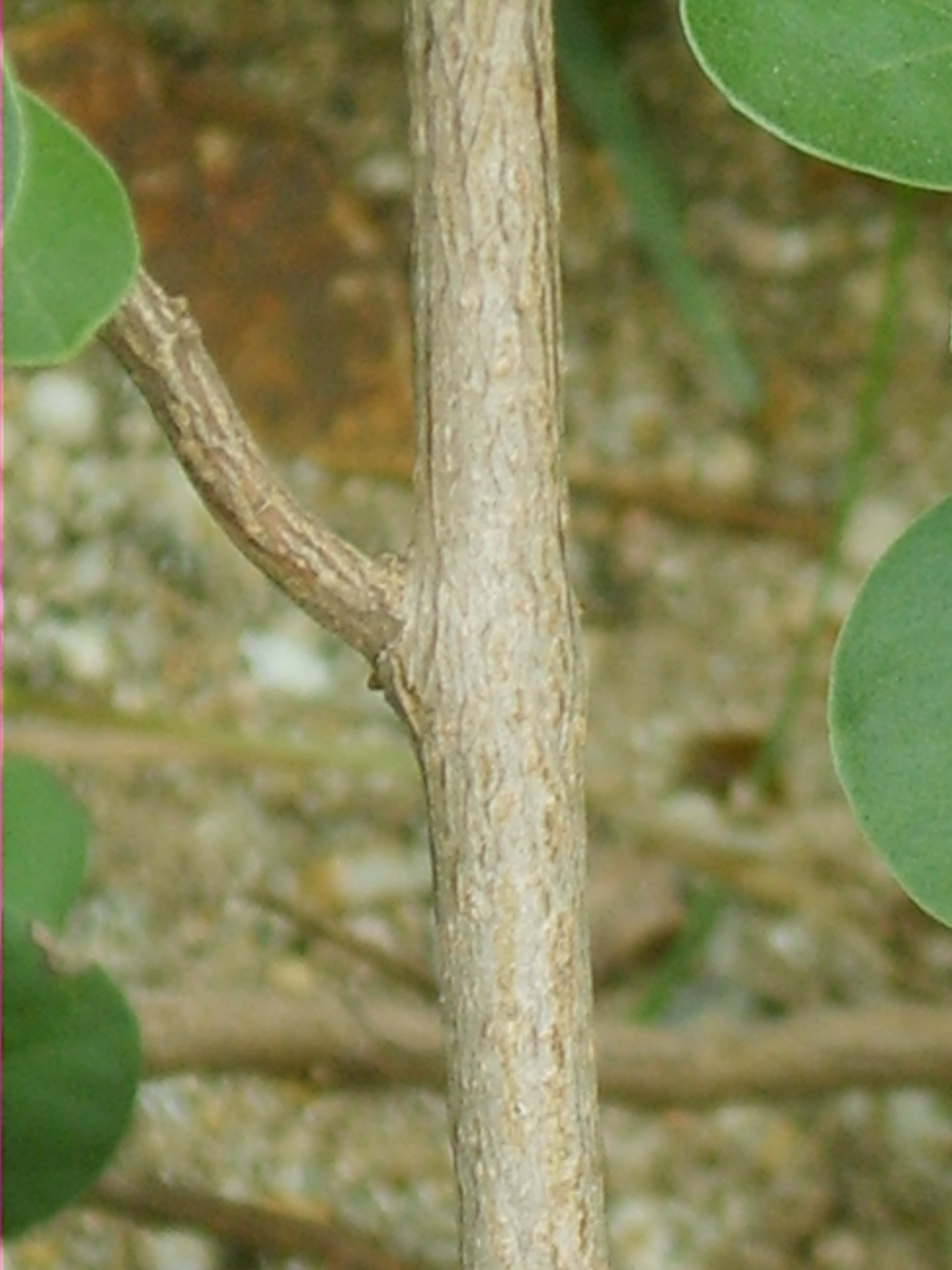

== Taxonomy ==
Vitex rotundifolia is a member of the family Lamiaceae and subfamily Viticoideae. The plant was originally described by the son of Carl Linnaeus, Carl Linnaeus the Younger The original description was published in Supplementum Plantarum in 1782. The generic epithet, Vitex, is derived from the Latin viere, meaning “to bind or twist” in reference to the rope-like stems produced by some species in the genus. The specific epithet, rotundifolia, is derived from the Latin rotundus, which means "round, spherical", and folium, meaning "leaf.” This is a reference to the rounded character of the leaves.

=== Family level classification ===
Vitex and all other members of the family Verbenaceae save those in the subfamily Verbenoideae were recently moved to the family Lamiaceae. As a result of this reorganization, two monophyletic families were established from the paraphyletic Verbenaceae and polyphyletic Lamiaceae. This new classification scheme was initially proposed by Cantino in 1992. Subsequent cpDNA analysis, rbcL sequence analysis, chemotaxonomic studies, and morphological analyses have supported the original logic for family reorganization.

This revision has resulted in some confusion regarding the classification of V. rotundifolia in the literature. Despite the fact that the revision is well supported with volumes of data, many authors continue to incorrectly place the plant in Verbenaceae.

=== Species level classification ===
Recent revisions of the genus Vitex have placed V. rotundifolia in synonymy with V. trifolia subsp. littoralis Steenis. Previous researchers have placed V. rotundifolia within V. trifolia. Moldenke (1958) placed V. rotundifolia in synonymy with V. trifolia var. simplicifolia. The placement of Moldenke was in disagreement with Corner (1939), which held V. rotundifolia as distinct from V. trifolia. The placement of Corner was subsequently supported by several authors: Fosberg (1962), Munir (1987), and Wagner (1999).

=== Common names ===
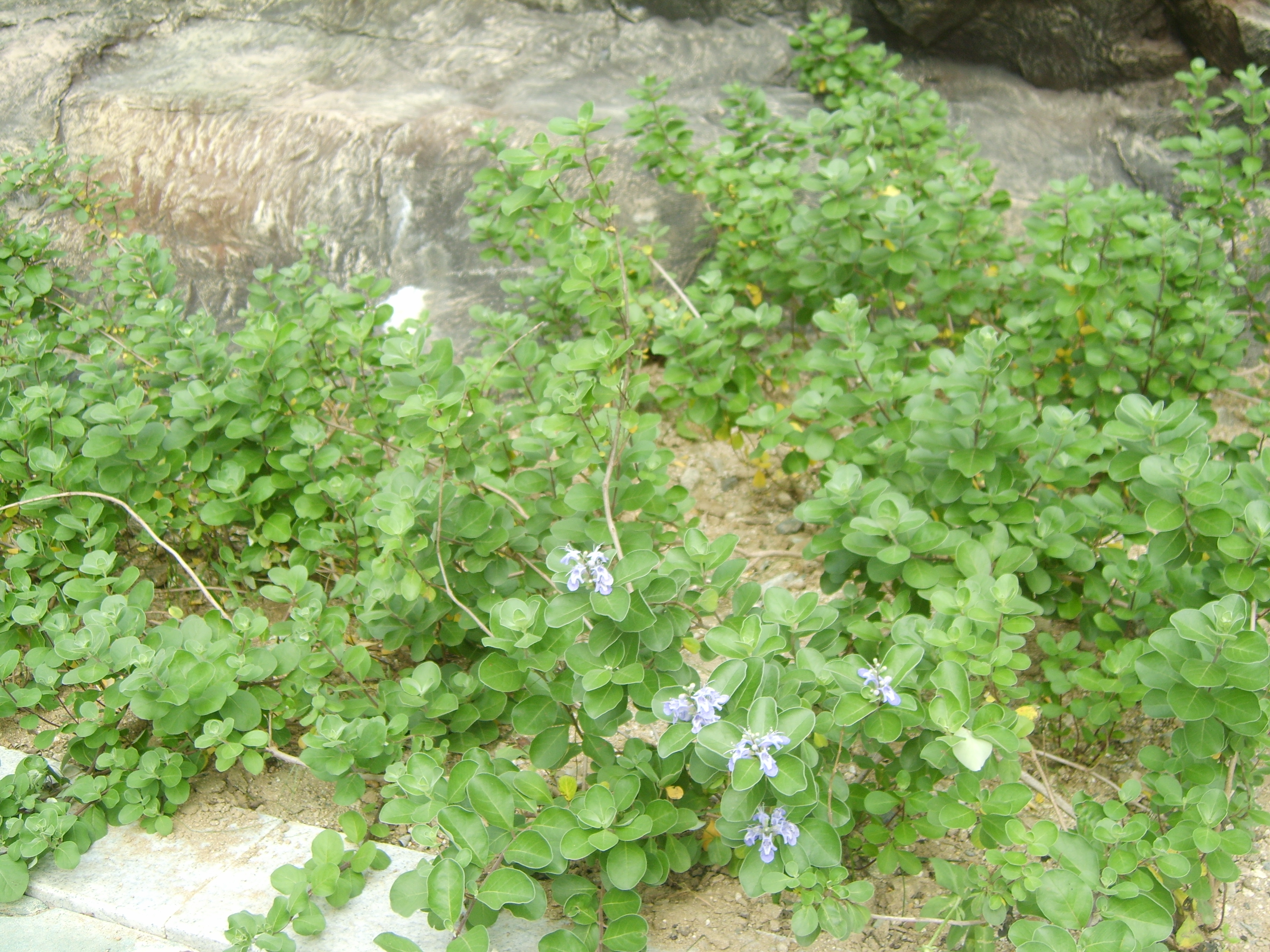
Vitex rotundifolia growing on rocks in Incheon, Korea

Likely due to the wide range over which V. rotundifolia is native, the plant has acquired a host of common names.

English speaking countries

- Beach vitex
- Round-leaved chaste tree
- Single-leaf chaste tree
- Chasteberry
- Monk's pepper

China

- Dan ye man jing

Japan

- Hamagou

Korea

- Sunbiginamu
- Man Hyung Ja(mainly medicinal name)

Hawaii

- Kolokolo kahakai
- Hinahina kolo
- Manawanawa
- Mawanawana
- Pōhinahina
- Polinalina

=== Hybrids ===
Multiple hybrids between Vitex agnus-castus and Vitex rotundifolia have been developed at the Chicago Botanic Garden. These cultivars have undergone successful trials at Longwood Gardens. The characteristics of the hybrids are more like those of V. rotundifolia than V. agnus-castus. However, the hybrids are more upright than V. rotundifolia and have been described as "open and spreading." The leaf characteristics are intermediate between the two parent plants while the blue-purple flower color of the parents persists in the hybrid.

== Distribution and habitat ==
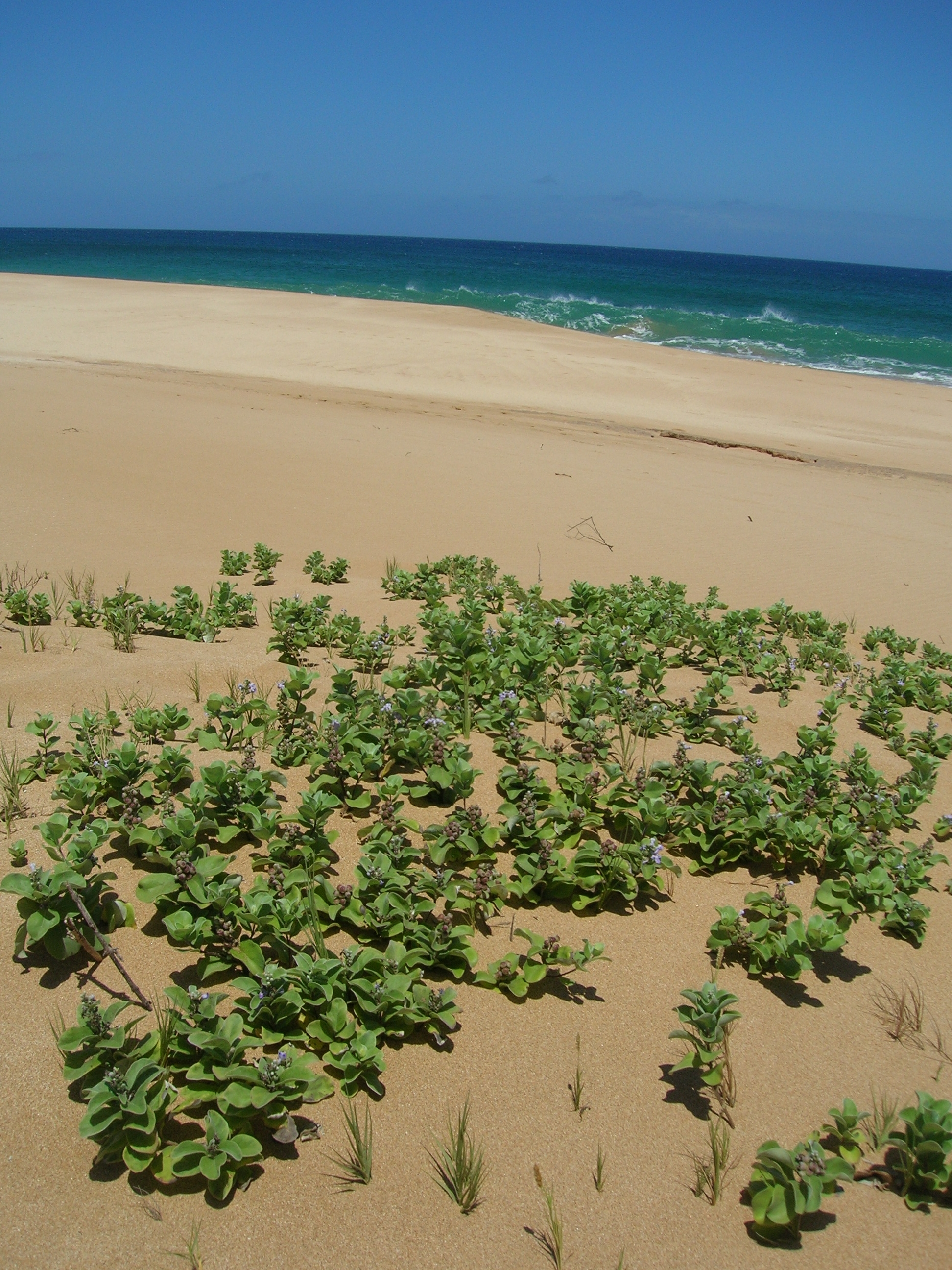
Vitex rotundifolia on a beach in Hawaii, US

V. rotundifolia grows along sandy and rocky coasts from 0 to 15 m above sea level. Plants grow down to the ocean waves themselves. V. rotundifolia is highly tolerant of the harsh beach dune environment characterized by intense heat, high wind, coarse-textured soil, and elevated salinity.

This plant's natural range includes much of the Pacific Rim and many of the Pacific islands. The plant was observed by Munir from Northern and Western Australia, New Guinea, Indonesia, New Caledonia, Polynesia, Hawaii, Malaya, Philippines, and Hong Kong. Moldenke reported V. rotundifolia in Brazil, Mauritius, Reunion, Bangladesh, Sri Lanka, Andaman Islands, China, Taiwan, Japan, Ryukyu Islands, Korea, Indochina, Thailand, Borneo, and Sarawak. The plant has also been observed in southern India. Cultivation of V. rotundifolia has been reported in England, Florida, Germany, the Hawaiian Islands, Hong Kong, Java, Johnston Island, Maryland, and New York. At present in the United States, beach vitex has become naturalized only in southeastern states along the east and gulf coasts.

== Biology and ecology ==
Beach vitex is a perennial that grows throughout the summer months in temperate and tropical areas of the Pacific. In temperate areas, the plant is deciduous and loses its leaves during the cool nights of fall. In the southeastern United States, leaves emerge in April while flowering occurs from June–August with fruiting following shortly thereafter. Fruits may remain attached to the plant into the early spring. V. rotundifolia is capable of overwintering on the dunes in South and North Carolina and in gulf coastal areas. It can survive in USDA hardiness zones 6b to 10.

=== Growth ===
The plant grows rapidly, and reproduces through vegetative means. As the plant matures, it begins to flower. After maturation, the plant produces large numbers of fruits (up to 5581 fruits per square meter).

=== Pollination ===
Insect visitation is the likely method of pollen transfer due to the spatial separation of the anthers and stigma, which would make self-pollination unlikely. Abe reported V. rotundifolia flowers on Nishino-shima Island were visited by flies, honey bees, beetles, butterflies, and ants though most of the visitors were ants. Diverse groups of pollinators visit the flowers in search of the 0.5 μL per flower nectar reward. Due to this wide range of visitors, it is unlikely the plant would require a specialist insect to mediate successful pollination.

=== Dormancy ===
Evidence indicates that beach vitex possesses a combinational dormancy mechanism. This dormancy mechanism is made up of a physical dormancy component and a physiological dormancy component. The physical dormancy mechanism is believed to be inforced at least in part by cuticular alkanes that prevent water penetration. The mechanism of the physiological dormancy component is not yet fully understood. This dormancy mechanism allows for the establishment of a substantial soil seed bank that is capable of surviving and producing new seedlings in excess of 4 years after all vegetation has been removed. Dormancy mechanisms also allow the plant to undergo long-distance dispersal.

=== Dispersal ===
There is substantial supportive evidence of a water-based dispersal mechanism for beach vitex fruits. V. rotundifolia plants are present throughout the Pacific including coastal areas of two continents and many islands. Bird dispersal is highly unlikely as there is no fleshy fruit reward; water dispersal is the most likely dispersal means capable of enabling dispersal over such long distances. Fruits are covered with thick coatings of hydrophobic cuticular alkanes allowing them to resist water penetration for extended periods. Researchers have observed V. rotundifolia fruits floating on rivers and oceans.

=== Genetic diversity ===
Genetic diversity within populations has been found to be much lower than the average for most woody plants. Additionally, the divergence between populations was found to be higher. There were large genetic differences between populations, indicating there is limited gene flow between populations. This is understandable due to the limited ecological niche beach vitex inhabits. Since the populations are largely clonal, this may enhance genetic drift. Significant variations have been observed with regard to genotype and chemotype of various beach vitex samples collected from across China. Genotypic and chemotypic variations were closely associated. Large genetic variation between populations was observed with lower variation within populations, and plants within 20 m of each other were closely related. It was believed that differentiation of separated populations might be the cause of variations between populations.

== Medicinal uses ==
Vitex rotundifolia has many medicinal uses. These uses generally parallel those of Vitex agnus-castus.

== Environmental concerns ==
In areas where it has been introduced outside of its native range, V. rotundifolia has proven to be an invasive species. This plant dominates dune ecosystems leading to a reduction in the prevalence of native species. Native species exclusion is of particular concern because some of the species that share a niche with V. rotundifolia, such as sea beach amaranth (Amaranthus pumilus Rafinesque), are presently listed as threatened.

Vitex rotundifolia fruits have been shown to transfer cuticular alkanes to the sand substrate. This results in intense sand hydrophobicity that persists in the soil for many years. This hydrophobicity might negatively impact dune recovery or serve as a means for limiting growth of native plant species.

Sea turtle conservation groups have publicized concerns that dense V. rotundifolia growth may prevent sea turtles from reaching acceptable nesting sites. These same organizations believe that V. rotundifolia may limit the ability of baby turtles to reach the ocean after they hatch. A recent USA Today article mentioned these concerns as part of an effort to raise awareness of V. rotundifolia, and has at least one review article. However, these concerns have not been validated scientifically. Several sea turtle species nest along the coasts of the Carolinas. These include the endangered loggerhead turtle (Caretta caretta), the endangered green turtle (Chelonia mydas), and the critically endangered Kemp's ridley (Lepidochelys kempii). If scientific evidence is found to support claims that V. rotundifolia harms sea turtles, this threat would constitute a substantial environmental issue.

Beach vitex emits large amounts of methyl chloride from its leaves. V. rotundifolia was one of the six highest emitting species of 33 possessing this characteristic. A total of 187 species were examined. Methyl chloride is produced naturally, but may be responsible for a substantial portion of the negative impacts on the stratospheric ozone layer.

=== Legislation ===
In light of the invasive characteristics of V. rotundifolia, it has been added to the North Carolina Noxious Weed List (effective 2/1/2009). Plants on this list are effectively banned within the state in that possession, sale, and transport of these species is illegal. Virginia has enacted a permanent statewide quarantine (effective 05/07/12) to limit further V. rotundifolia spread. At least 12 municipalities in North and South Carolina have enacted ordinances that ban V. rotundifolia planting and require homeowners to remove established plantings from their property. In June 2020 Florida also banned V. rotundifolia, making it illegal to purchase in Florida or to move it into or within the state.

=== Control measures ===
Initially, beach vitex stems are wounded using a machete. A 5.25% solution of imazapyr is applied to the wounded areas of the stems. After a period of 6 months, all stems are removed. This treatment procedure is repeated until zero regrowth is observed. Triclopyr may be used to treat small resprouts and seedlings.
