= Teijsmanniodendron =

Scientific classification
- Kingdom: Plantae
- Clade: Tracheophytes
- Clade: Angiosperms
- Clade: Eudicots
- Clade: Asterids
- Order: Lamiales
- Family: Lamiaceae
- Subfamily: Viticoideae
- Genus: Teijsmanniodendron; Koord.

Synonyms
- Xerocarpa H.J.Lam

Genus of flowering plants

Teijsmanniodendron is a genus of flowering plants in the mint family, Lamiaceae, first described in 1904. It is native to Southeast Asia and Papuasia.

Species

- Teijsmanniodendron ahernianum (Merr.) Bakh. - Borneo, Sumatra, Sulawesi, Philippines, Maluku, New Guinea, Solomon Islands
- Teijsmanniodendron bintuluense Moldenke - Sarawak
- Teijsmanniodendron bogoriense Koord. - Thailand, Borneo, Sumatra, Sulawesi, Philippines, Maluku, New Guinea
- Teijsmanniodendron bullatum Rusea - Sarawak, Sabah
- Teijsmanniodendron coriaceum (C.B.Clarke) Kosterm - Thailand, Malaya, Borneo, Sumatra
- Teijsmanniodendron glabrum Merr. - Borneo, Sumatra
- Teijsmanniodendron havilandii (Ridl.) Rusea - Sarawak
- Teijsmanniodendron hollrungii (Warb.) Kosterm - Malaya, Borneo, Sulawesi, Maluku, New Guinea, Solomon Islands, Bismarck Archipelago
- Teijsmanniodendron holophyllum (Baker) Kosterm. - Vietnam, Borneo, Malaya, Sumatra, New Guinea, Tawi-Tawi Island in Philippines
- Teijsmanniodendron latiffii Rusea - Borneo
- Teijsmanniodendron obscurinerve Rusea - Sabah
- Teijsmanniodendron pteropodum (Miq.) Bakh. - Nicobar Islands, Indochina, Sumatra, Philippines
- Teijsmanniodendron punctatum Rusea - Sarawak
- Teijsmanniodendron renageorgeae Rusea - Sarawak, Brunei
- Teijsmanniodendron sarawakanum (H.Pearson) Kosterm. - Borneo
- Teijsmanniodendron scaberrimum Kosterm. ex Rusea - Borneo
- Teijsmanniodendron simplicifolium Merr - Borneo, Malaya, Sumatra
- Teijsmanniodendron simplicioides Kosterm. - Borneo, Malaya
- Teijsmanniodendron sinclairii Kosterm. - Terengganu, Borneo
- Teijsmanniodendron smilacifolium (H.Pearson) Kosterm. - Borneo
- Teijsmanniodendron subspicatum (Hallier f.) Kosterm. - Borneo, Sumatra
- Teijsmanniodendron unifoliolatum (Merr.) Moldenke - Borneo, Mindanao
- Teijsmanniodendron zainudinii Rusea - Sabah
