= Trattinnickia aspera =

Conservation status
- Least Concern (IUCN 2.3)

Scientific classification
- Kingdom: Plantae
- Clade: Tracheophytes
- Clade: Angiosperms
- Clade: Eudicots
- Clade: Rosids
- Order: Sapindales
- Family: Burseraceae
- Genus: Trattinnickia
- Species: T. aspera

Binomial name
- Trattinnickia aspera (Standl.) Swart (1942)

Synonyms
- Protium asperum Standl. (1926); Trattinnickia barbourii Little (1969)

Species of tree

Trattinnickia aspera is a species of plant in the Burseraceae family. It is found in Colombia, Costa Rica, Ecuador, Nicaragua, Panama, Peru, and Bolivia.
