= Wenzel Benno Seidl =

Wenzel Benno Seidl (sometimes spelt as Seidel; 14 September 1773 – 7 February 1842) was a Bohemian-Austrian botanist and entomologist. He examined the flora of Bohemia and also collected insect specimens from the region. The sedge genus Seidlia was named in his honour in 1826 by Philipp Maximilian Opiz but it is now a synonym of Scirpus.

== Biography ==
Seidl was born in Schüttenhofen and studied agriculture. He attended the lectures of Franz Willibald Schmidt in Prague and became interested in botany and began to examine the plants of the region. He became an accounts officer in the Imperial and Royal Provincial Accounting Office in Prague around 1809. He contributed to the Tentamen florae Bohemicae by Johann Ehrenfried Pohl. He wrote a manuscript on the wild plants of Bohemia titled Icones plantarum selectarum in Bohemia sponte nascentium with illustrations and hoped to produce a flora of Bohemia. It however remained unfinished. He also contributed to another work on the flora of Bohemia in 1836 with Friedrich von Berchtold, Franz Wilhelm Sieber, Philipp Maximilian Opiz, and Wilhelm Rudolf Weitenweber. He contributed to a work on roses by Tobias Seitz in 1825 and influenced the botanist brothers Jan Svatopluk Presl and Carl Borivoj Presl, teaching them herbarium techniques.
