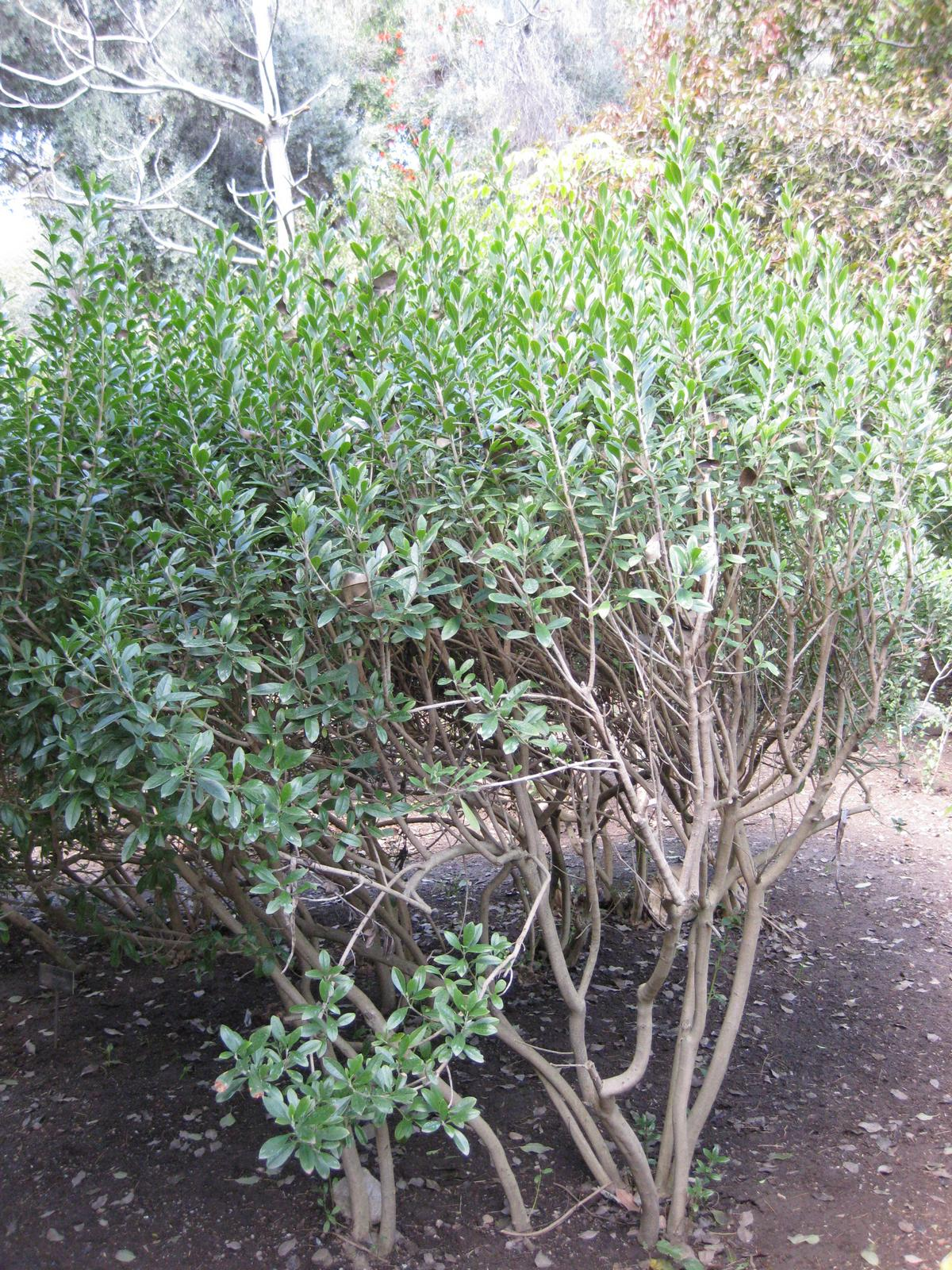
- Petitia oleina (Mexico 28814), Photographed at Huntington Gardens (Los Angeles, California) in March

Scientific classification
- Kingdom: Plantae
- Clade: Tracheophytes
- Clade: Angiosperms
- Clade: Eudicots
- Clade: Asterids
- Order: Lamiales
- Family: Lamiaceae
- Subfamily: Viticoideae
- Genus: Petitia; Jacq.

Synonyms
- Scleroon Benth. ex Lindl

= Petitia =

Bastard stopper

Genus of flowering plants

Petitia, called the bastard stopper, is a genus of flowering plants in the mint family, Lamiaceae, first described in 1760. It contains two known species, native to Florida and the West Indies.

Species

- Petitia domingensis Jacq. - Bahamas, Cayman Islands, Cuba, Hispaniola, Jamaica, Puerto Rico, Leeward Islands, Miami-Dade County in Florida
- Petitia urbanii Ekman. - Cuba, Tortuga Island in Haiti
