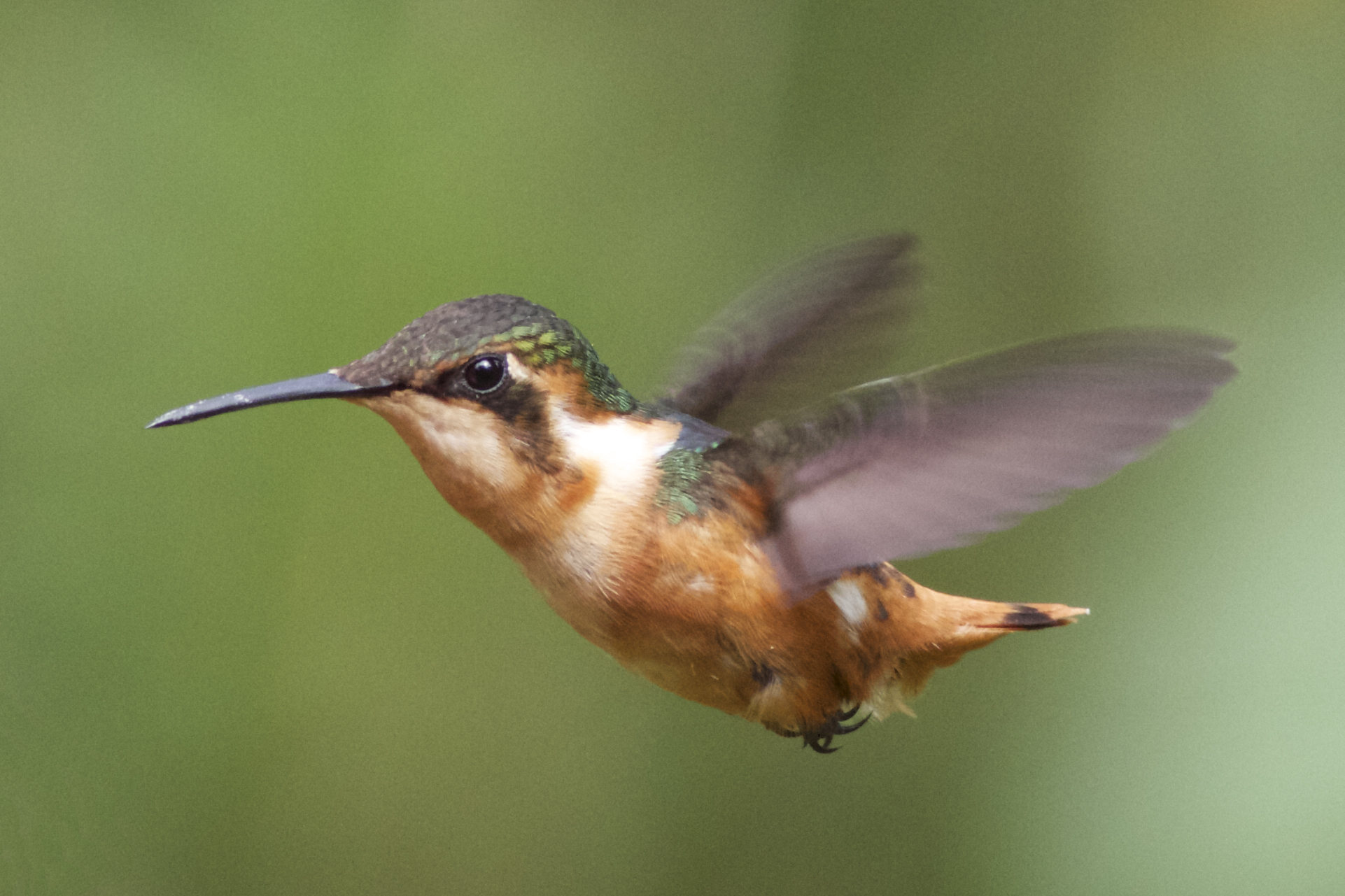
- Female gorgeted woodstar (Chaetocercus heliodor)

Scientific classification
- Kingdom: Animalia
- Phylum: Chordata
- Class: Aves
- Clade: Strisores
- Order: Apodiformes
- Family: Trochilidae
- Tribe: Mellisugini
- Genus: Chaetocercus; G.R. Gray, 1855

Type species
- Ornismya jourdanii (rufous-shafted woodstar) Bourcier, 1839

Synonyms
- Acestrura Gould, 1861

= Chaetocercus =

Genus of birds

Chaetocercus is a genus of hummingbirds in the family Trochilidae.

== Taxonomy ==
The genus Chaetocercus was introduced in 1855 by the English zoologist George Robert Gray with the rufous-shafted woodstar as the type species. The name is a combination of the Ancient Greek words khaitē, meaning "hair" and kerkos, meaning "tail".

The species, except for the rufous-shafted woodstar, were formerly placed in the genus Acestrura. In 1999 Karl-Ludwig Schuchmann remarked in the Handbook of the Birds of the World that for the species placed in Acestrura: "...no evidence in external morphology justifies treatment in a genus separate from C. jourdanii". Molecular phylogenetic studies have shown that the genus Chaetocercus is sister to the slender-tailed woodstar that is placed in its own genus Microstilbon.

The genus contains six species:

Male	Female	Common name	Scientific name	Distribution
		White-bellied woodstar	Chaetocercus mulsant	
		Little woodstar	Chaetocercus bombus	
		Gorgeted woodstar	Chaetocercus heliodor	
		Santa Marta woodstar	Chaetocercus astreans	
		Esmeraldas woodstar	Chaetocercus berlepschi	
		Rufous-shafted woodstar	Chaetocercus jourdanii	
