= Pseudocarpidium =

Scientific classification
- Kingdom: Plantae
- Clade: Tracheophytes
- Clade: Angiosperms
- Clade: Eudicots
- Clade: Asterids
- Order: Lamiales
- Family: Lamiaceae
- Subfamily: Viticoideae
- Genus: Pseudocarpidium; Millsp.

Genus of flowering plants

Pseudocarpidium is a genus of flowering plants in the family Lamiaceae first described in 1906. It is native the West Indies (Bahamas, Cuba, Hispaniola).

Species

1. Pseudocarpidium avicennioides (A.Rich.) Millsp. - eastern Cuba
2. Pseudocarpidium domingense (Urb. & Ekman) Moldenke - Hispaniola
3. Pseudocarpidium ilicifolium (A.Rich.) Millsp. - Cuba
4. Pseudocarpidium multidens (Urb.) Moldenke - eastern Cuba
5. Pseudocarpidium neglecta Bisse - Cuba
6. Pseudocarpidium pungens Britton - eastern Cuba
7. Pseudocarpidium rigens (Griseb.) Britton - eastern Cuba
8. Pseudocarpidium shaferi Britton - eastern Cuba
9. Pseudocarpidium wrightii Millsp. - Bahamas, Cuba
