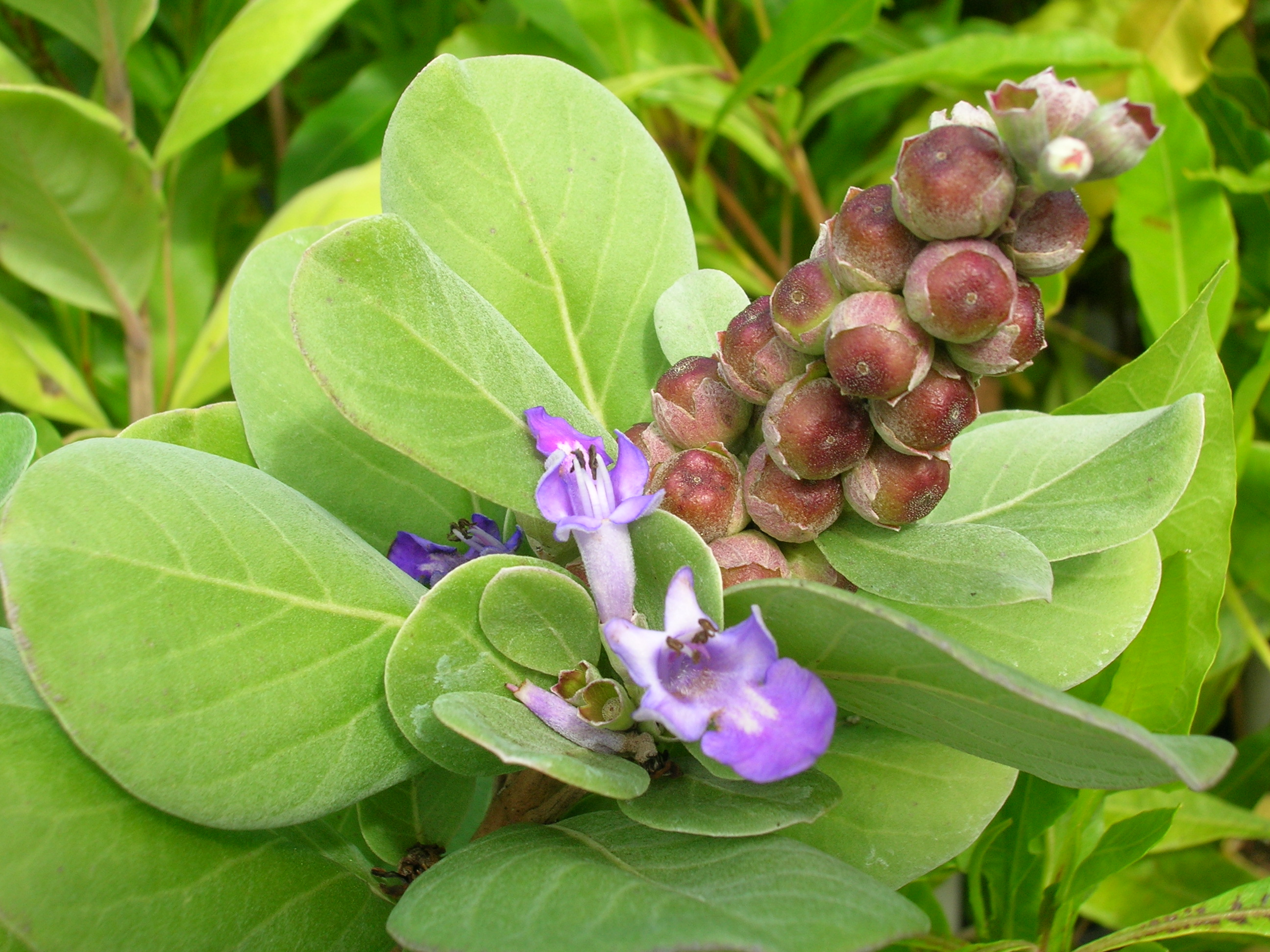
- Vitex rotundifolia

Scientific classification
- Kingdom: Plantae
- Clade: Tracheophytes
- Clade: Angiosperms
- Clade: Eudicots
- Clade: Asterids
- Order: Lamiales
- Family: Lamiaceae
- Subfamily: Viticoideae

Genera
- See text

= Viticoideae =

Subfamily of flowering plants in the sage family

Viticoideae is one of seven subfamilies in the family Lamiaceae.

== Genera ==
This subfamily contains the following 10 genera:

- Cornutia L.
- Gmelina L.
- Paravitex Fletcher
- Petitia Jacq.
- Pseudocarpidium Millsp.
- Premna L.
- Teijsmanniodendron Koorders
- Tsoongia Merrill
- Viticipremna H.J.Lam
- Vitex L.
