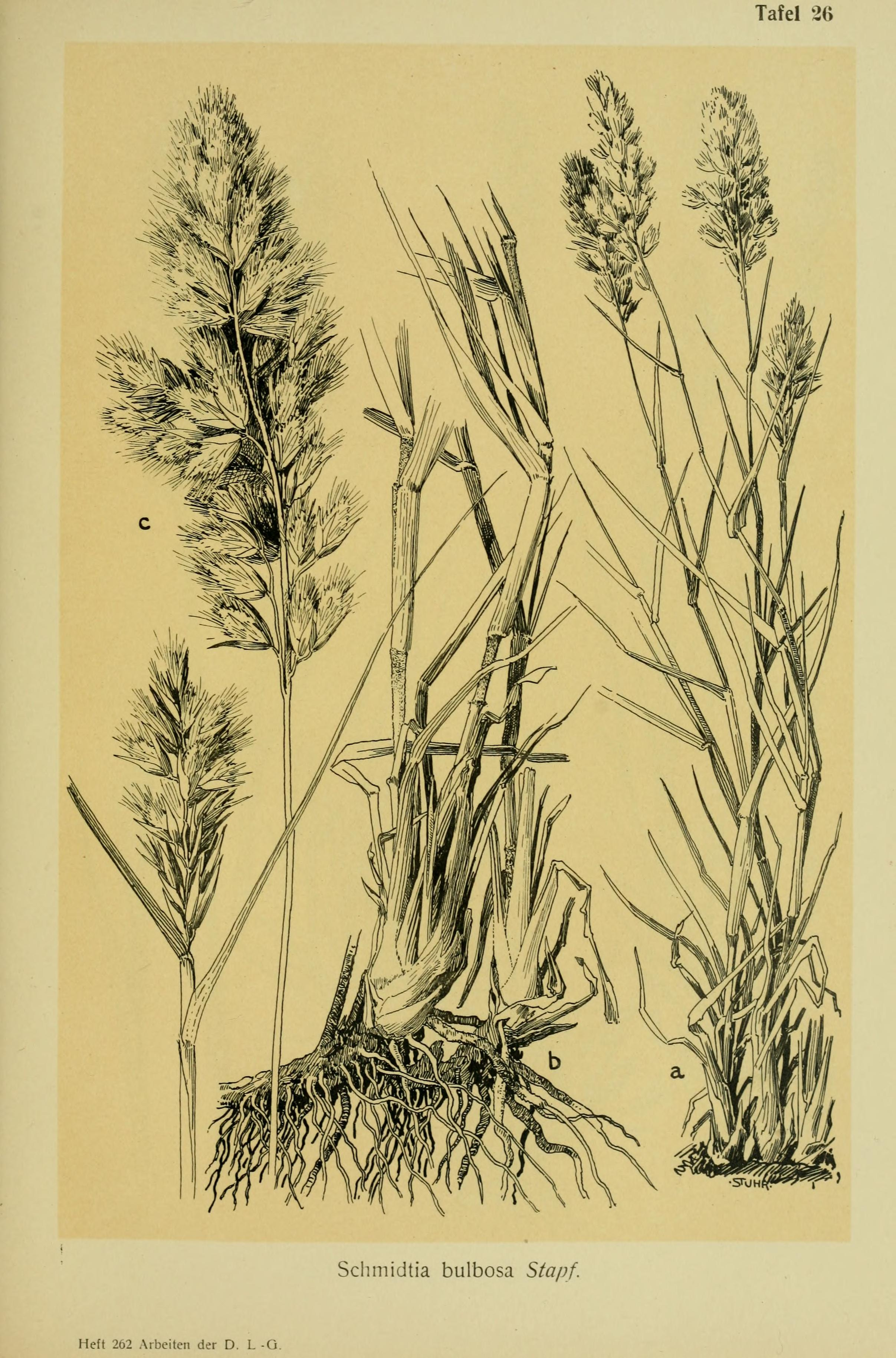

Scientific classification
- Kingdom: Plantae
- Clade: Tracheophytes
- Clade: Angiosperms
- Clade: Monocots
- Clade: Commelinids
- Order: Poales
- Family: Poaceae
- Subfamily: Chloridoideae
- Genus: Schmidtia
- Species: S. pappophoroides

Binomial name
- Schmidtia pappophoroides Steud.

= Schmidtia pappophoroides =

Species of grass

Schmidtia pappophoroides (Afrikaans: meerjarige Kalaharisandkweek, Khoekhoe: ǀkhurub, Otjiherero: ongorondji, Juǀʼhoan: beye-ǁxui-doa, German: Ausdauerndes Fünfborstengras) is a perennial grass belonging to the grass family (Poaceae). It is native to southern and western Africa and the Cape Verde. Schmidtia pappophoroides can be used to thatch roofs, and it is a valuable fodder grass in Namibia.
