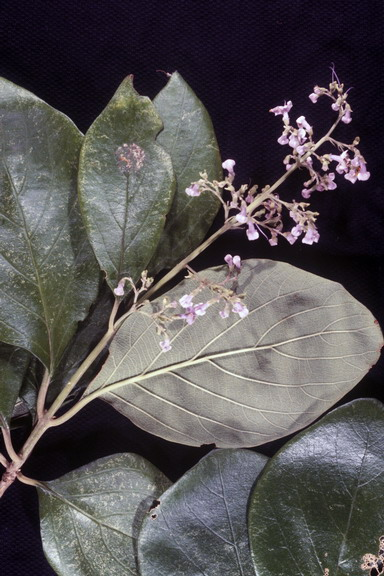

Conservation status
- Critically Endangered (IUCN 3.1)

Scientific classification
- Kingdom: Plantae
- Clade: Embryophytes
- Clade: Tracheophytes
- Clade: Spermatophytes
- Clade: Angiosperms
- Clade: Eudicots
- Clade: Asterids
- Order: Lamiales
- Family: Lamiaceae
- Genus: Cornutia
- Species: C. obovata

Binomial name
- Cornutia obovata Urb.

= Cornutia obovata =

Species of plant

Cornutia obovata is a rare species of tree in the mint family, and formerly considered a member of the verbena family. It is endemic to forested slopes in Puerto Rico, where its common names are capá jigüerilla, nigua, and palo de nigua. When it was added to the endangered species list of the United States in 1988 there were only seven individuals known to remain in the wild. By 1998 there were eight plants known. This is considered one population divided amongst a few locations in the mountain forests of the island.

This is an evergreen tree which can reach 10 metres (33 ft) in maximum height and 15 centimetres (5.9 in) in trunk diameter. The oppositely arranged leaves are oval in shape and hairy on the undersides. It bears clusters of tubular purple flowers.

The tree grows in limestone and serpentine substrates in forested habitat. Other plants associated with the tree include Daphnopsis philippiana, Dendropanax laurifolius, Guettarda ovalifolia, and Miconia sintenisii. The nectar of the flowers on cultivated specimens is harvested by the carpenter ant Camponotus abdominalis var. floridanus.

This tree has been rare as long as such data have been collected, which is one reason it is in danger of extinction. While the species could be wiped out in any single severe event, it is more likely that it will slowly approach extinction as the few living individuals die. Another threat is deforestation, which has cleared many trees and other plants from the mountains of Puerto Rico. This species has been purposely cut down. The tree is being propagated in Fairchild Tropical Garden, Coral Gables, Florida.
