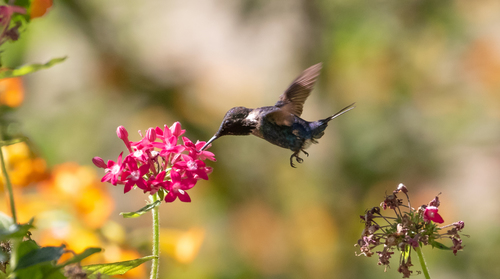

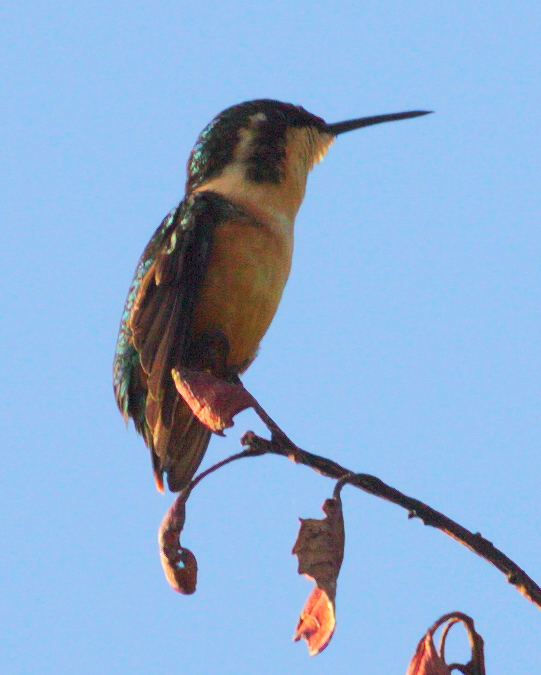

Conservation status
- Least Concern (IUCN 3.1)
- CITES Appendix II

Scientific classification
- Kingdom: Animalia
- Phylum: Chordata
- Class: Aves
- Order: Apodiformes
- Family: Trochilidae
- Genus: Chaetocercus
- Species: C. astreans

Binomial name
- Chaetocercus astreans (Bangs, 1899)

Synonyms
- Acestrura astreans, Chaetocercus heliodor astreans

= Santa Marta woodstar =

Species of hummingbird

The Santa Marta woodstar (Chaetocercus astreans) is a species of hummingbird in tribe Mellisugini of subfamily Trochilinae, the "bee hummingbirds". It is endemic to Colombia.

== Taxonomy and systematics ==
The Santa Marta woodstar and several other species in genus Chaetocercus were formerly placed in genus Acestrura. In addition, it was for a time treated as a subspecies of the gorgeted woodstar (C. heliodor). It has been in its current position since the late 20th century. It is monotypic.

== Description ==
The Santa Marta woodstar is about 7 cm (2.8 in) long. Both sexes have a straight black bill. The male's head is shiny green and the rest of the upperparts dark shiny bluish. It has a reddish gorget that extends across the neck. The breast is gray and the belly bluish with a white spot on the flanks. The tail is forked, with very short central feathers and outer ones that are bare shafts. The female is bronzy green above and pale cinnamon-rufous below with a dark cheek patch and, like the male, a white spot on the flanks. Its rounded tail has green central feathers and the rest are cinnamon with a black bar near the end.

== Distribution and habitat ==
The Santa Marta woodstar is found only in the isolated Sierra Nevada de Santa Marta of northern Colombia. It inhabits the edges of montane forest, semi-open woodlands, and coffee plantations, and occasionally visits the lower parts of the páramo. In elevation it ranges between 825 and 2,000 m (2,700 and 6,600 ft).

== Behavior ==
=== Movement ===
The Santa Marta woodstar's movements, if any, are not known but seasonal elevational changes are thought likely.

=== Feeding ===
The Santa Marta woodstar feeds on nectar and insects, though no details are known. It is assumed to have a foraging strategy and diet like those of its close relative the gorgeted woodstar. That species feeds from vegetation's middle strata to the canopy; one important source is the flowers of Inga trees. It does not defend feeding territories, and because of its small size and slow bumblebee-like flight is sometimes able to feed in the territories of other hummingbirds.

=== Breeding ===
Nothing is known about the Santa Marta woodstar's breeding phenology.

=== Vocalization ===
The Santa Marta woodstar's vocalizations have seldom been recorded. What is possibly its song is "a regularly repeated, single, modulated squeaky note." It makes "a series of single liquid 'tsit' notes or a doubled 'ti-tsit'" calls while hovering or feeding.

== Status ==
The IUCN has assessed the Santa Marta woodstar as being of Least Concern. Though it has a limited range and its population size is unknown, the latter is believed to be stable. It is considered locally common and readily accepts some human-altered landscapes like coffee plantations, though some of its natural habitat is under threat of deforestation.
