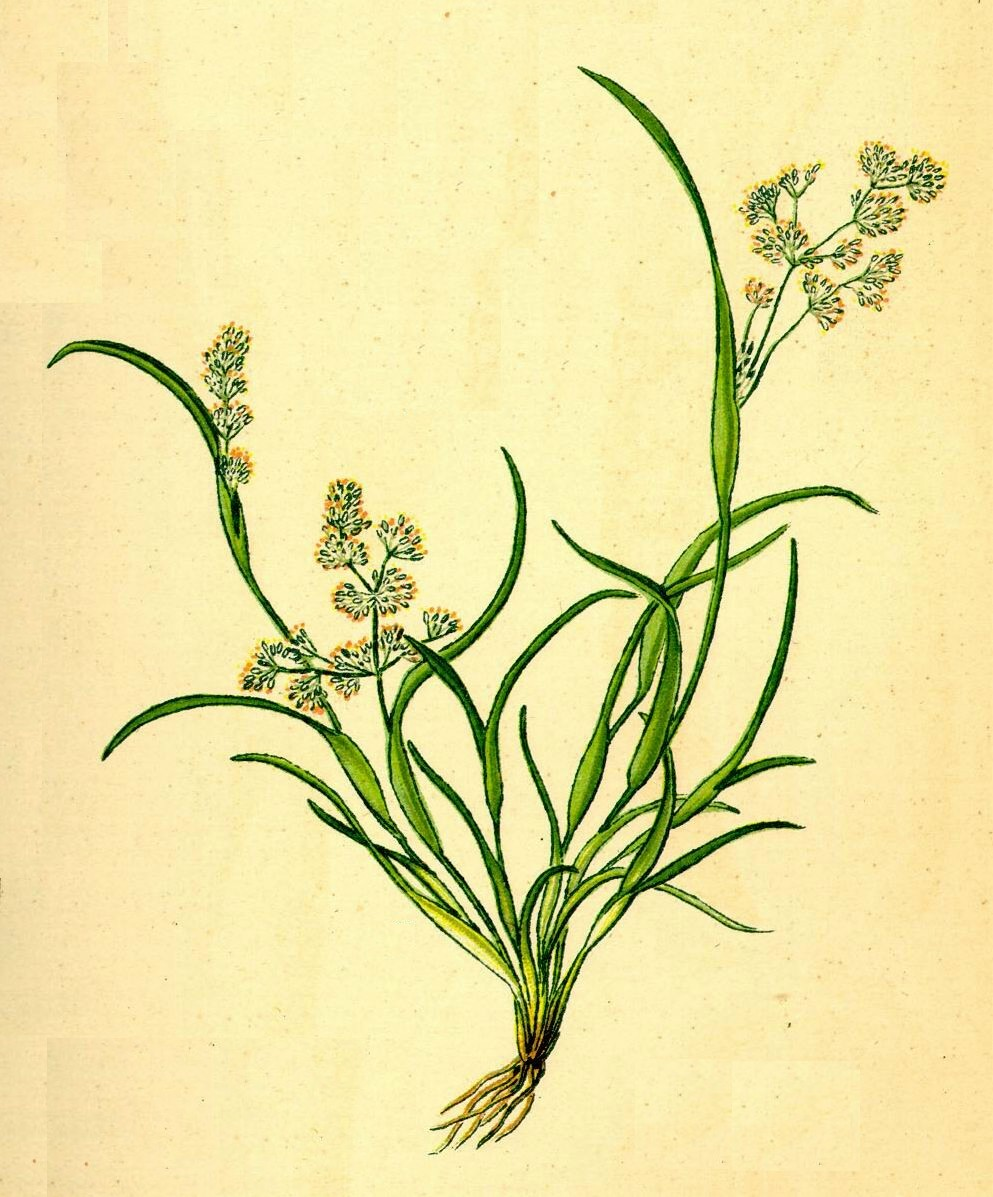
- Coleanthus subtilis

Scientific classification
- Kingdom: Plantae
- Clade: Tracheophytes
- Clade: Angiosperms
- Clade: Monocots
- Clade: Commelinids
- Order: Poales
- Family: Poaceae
- Subfamily: Pooideae
- Supertribe: Poodae
- Tribe: Poeae
- Subtribe: Coleanthinae
- Genus: Coleanthus; Seidl
- Species: C. subtilis

Binomial name
- Coleanthus subtilis (Tratt.) Seidl ex Roem. & Schult.

Synonyms
- Schmidtia Tratt. 1816, rejected homonym not Moench 1802 (Asteraceae) nor Steud. ex J.A. Schmidt 1852 (Poaceae); Wilibalda Sternb. ex Roth; Schmidtia subtilis Tratt.; Zizania subtilis (Tratt.) Raspail; Wilibalda subtilis (Tratt.) Roth; Schmidtia utriculata J.Presl & C.Presl; Schmidtia utriculosa Sternb.

= Coleanthus =

Genus of grasses

Coleanthus is a genus of Eurasian and North American plants in the grass family. The only known species is Coleanthus subtilis. It has a scattered distribution, found on lakeshores, streambanks, and other wet places in central Europe (France, Germany, Czech Republic; extinct in Norway and Italy), Asia (Western Siberia, Khabarovsk, eastern China), and northwestern North America (Oregon, Washington, British Columbia).

== Description ==
Coleanthus subtilis is a small-growing, clump-forming annual grass that often grows on the ground. The culms are thin, prostrate, or ascending, have two to three nodes, and a little groove. They grow to a length of 30 to 80 mm. The leaf sheaths are glabrous and closed in the lower half, especially the uppermost leaf sheath, which is strongly inflated. The ligules form a membranous fringe and scale between 0.5 and 0.8 mm. The glabrous leaf blades measure 10 to 20 mm in length and 1 to 2 mm in width. They are weakly grooved, folded, and often shaped like a sickle.

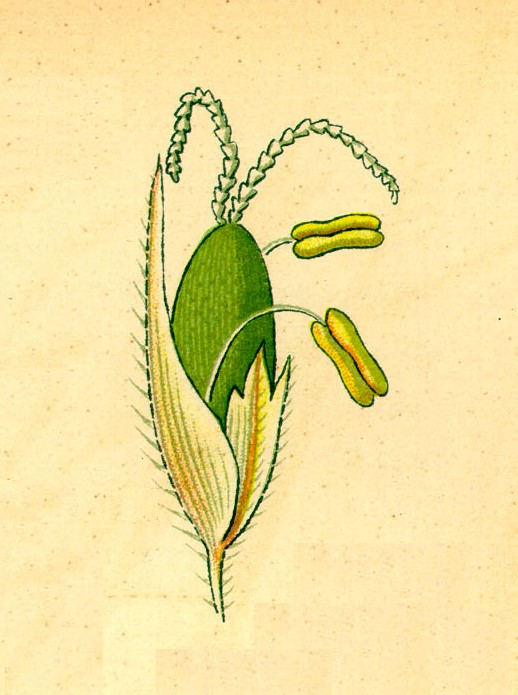
Spikelets

A panicle can vary in size from 10 to 30 mm. It is composed of several more or less dense groups of spikes arranged in tufts. The spikelets are uniflorous and grow 0.8 to 1.2 mm long. They stay on the panicle even after the ripening stage. The glumes are missing. The tender-skinned lemmas are single-nerved and grow 0.8 to 1.2 mm in length. The remaining nerves are hairless, except for the median nerve, which is short and protruding hairy. They have an oval lower portion, an extended top portion, and a narrowly rounded or awn-pointed at the upper end. The two-nerved, glabrous, and tender-skinned bracteoles reach 0.4 to 0.6 mm long. They have wide, depressed sides and are four-pointed at the top. The two nerves each run out in a short tip. It develops into a pair of stamens. The filaments are attached to the base of the anthers, which have a length of approximately 0.3 mm. The stigmas of the ovaries are filiform and protrude from the flowers at the upper end. The fruits lengthen from 0.6 to 0.8 mm. They are wrinkly, stick out between the top and the front husk, and fall off without external action.

Coleanthus subtilis typically blossoms from June through September, with very few occurrences in early May or late November. It is diploid, with a chromosome number of 2n = 14.

== Distribution ==
The distribution area of Coleanthus subtilis extends over several small, highly disjunct sub-areas:

- Northwest France (Brittany)
- Central Europe: the species is primarily found in the Czech Republic, with formerly about 140 localities, and extend to Austria (only at some ponds in the Waldviertel, threatened with extinction), Slovakia, and Poland (near Wrocław). In Germany, it is extinct in the Westerwald (Rhineland-Palatinate) and near Mannheim (Baden-Wüttemberg), but it has lately been found in Saxony in Freiberg, Upper Lusatia, and Saxony-Anhalt near Wittenberg.
- South Tyrol, extinct (at two lakes near Bolzano and at Lake Dobbiaco)
- Norway, last in1842: near Oslo
- The area south of Lake Ladoga near Saint Petersburg
- West- Siberia
- on the middle and lower Amur (China)
- in North America, Coleanthus subtilis has been found in six areas in southern British Columbia (Canada) and on the Columbia River in Washington and Oregon (USA). It was discovered in 2007 in Canada's Northwest Territories, about 1700 km from the closest site. Due to its late American discovery (1880), it was considered that it had been brought over from Europe. However, several factors suggest that the species is also native to North America, including its very specialized habitat requirements, and rarity, which may have led to the late discovery of the species in America, and the absence of circumstantial evidence that it was actually introduced from Europe.

Coleanthus subtilis is listed in Annex II and IV of the Habitats Directive and is thus classified as a priority species. Due to its endangered status, it is given particular protection in Germany under the Federal Species Protection Ordinance.

== Ecology and sociology ==
Coleanthus subtilis is a therophyte with a six to seven-week life cycle. Generally, it grows in short-lived, patchy dwarf rush colonies that occupy 60–80% of the available space. It occurs in widely scattered locations, often in the mud of drained ponds, stream and river banks, and old-water margins. The plant is extremely rare and unstable. It vanishes as soon as the ground floods again. Under ideal conditions, it possesses a lifespan of two to four years. According to earlier research, the seeds can survive in flooded soil for up to 20 years without losing their ability to germinate.

It is spread by rivers at relatively short distances (hydrochory) and by waterfowl and swamp birds (zoochory). As a result, seed dissemination by wild ducks can account for the significantly disparate distributions in Bohemian Massif, Saint Petersburg, and Siberia.

In the Cypero-Limoselletum from the Nanocyperion association, Coleanthus subtilis is the most prevalent.

== Systematics, name, and botanical history ==
Coleanthus subtilis was discovered in 1811 by brothers Jan Svatopluk and Carl Borivoj Presl near Osek and it was first named in 1816 by Leopold Trattinnick under the name (basionym) Schmidtia subtilis. The plant was classified to the genus Coleanthus by Wenzel Benno Seidl in 1817 (in Roemer & Schultes: Systema vegetabilium).

The Greek words koleós, which means sword sheath, and ánthos, which means flower or blossom, are combined to form the name Coleanthus. The species epithet subtilis (Latin for fine, thin, delicate) refers to the thread-thin stems. The genus name translates directly to the German name Scheidenblütgras. The less precise translation of the species name, "sheath grass," emphasizes one of its most distinctive characteristics: expanded leaf sheaths.

In the genus Coleanthus, Coleanthus subtilis is the sole species. The genus belongs to the Poeae tribus in the Pooideae subfamily. Due to its significant distinctions from other grasses (lack of glumes, erectile tissue, two stamens, and elongated style), some authors place them in their own tribe Coleantheae. Mistakenly, the genus Coleanthus is often assigned six other species that were actually counted in the genus Coleosanthus of the daisy family. These species are now classified as belonging to the genus Brickellia.
