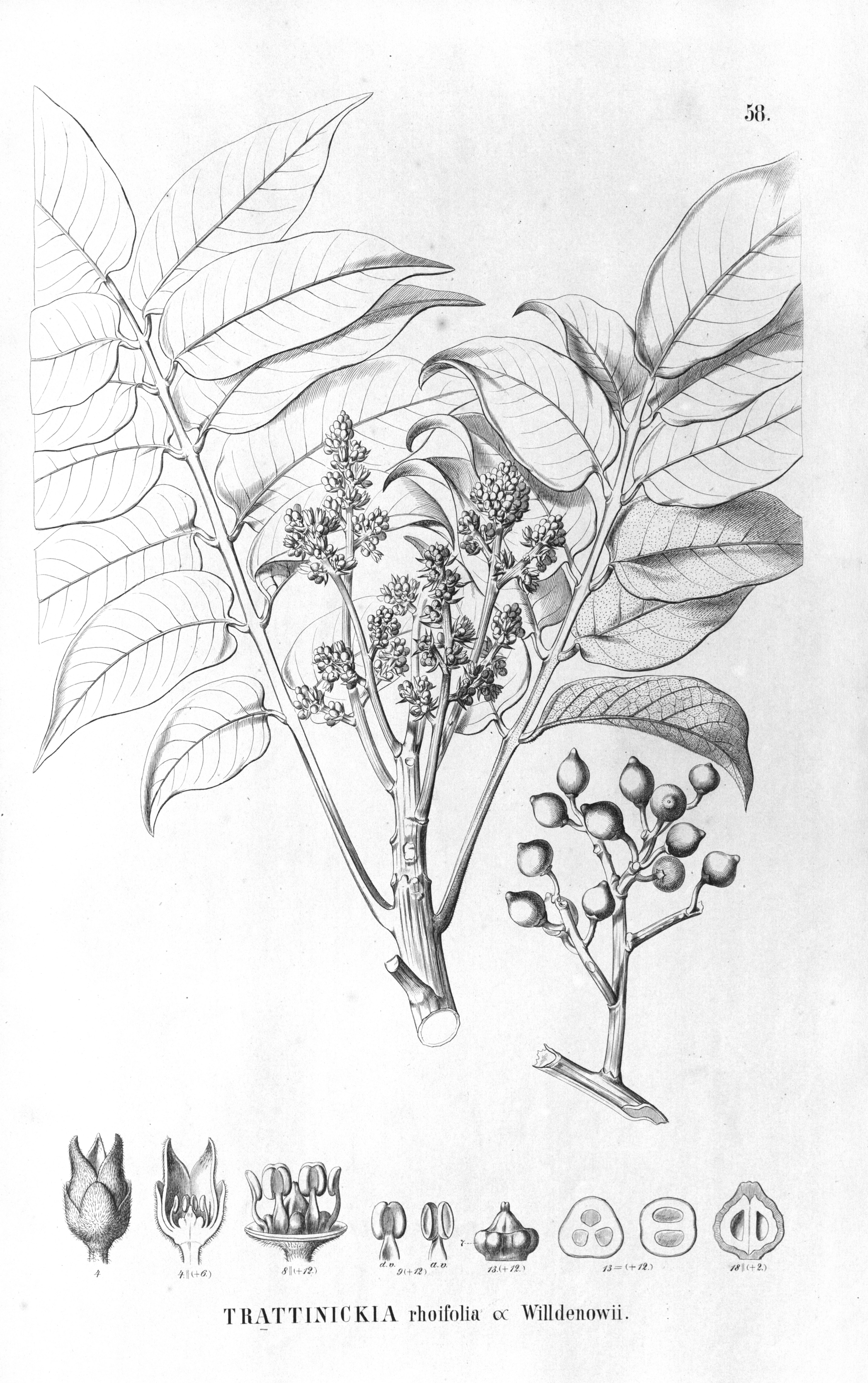
- Illustration of Trattinnickia rhoifolia from Flora Brasiliensis

Scientific classification
- Kingdom: Plantae
- Clade: Tracheophytes
- Clade: Angiosperms
- Clade: Eudicots
- Clade: Rosids
- Order: Sapindales
- Family: Burseraceae
- Genus: Trattinnickia; Willd.

= Trattinnickia =

Genus of flowering plants

Trattinnickia is a genus of flowering plants belonging to the family Burseraceae. It is in the Canarieae subfamily.

Its native range is from central and southern Tropical America (within Bolivia, Brazil, Colombia, Costa Rica, Ecuador, French Guiana, Guyana, Nicaragua, Panamá, Peru, Suriname, and Venezuela) and across the Caribbean to Trinidad and Tobago.

== Known species ==
According to Kew:

- Trattinnickia aspera (Standl.) Swart
- Trattinnickia boliviana (Swart) Daly
- Trattinnickia burserifolia Mart.
- Trattinnickia demerarae Sandwith
- Trattinnickia ferruginea Kuhlm.
- Trattinnickia glaziovii Swart
- Trattinnickia lancifolia (Cuatrec.) Daly
- Trattinnickia lawrancei Standl. ex Swart
- Trattinnickia laxiflora Swart
- Trattinnickia lorenziana Daly & M.F.F.Melo
- Trattinnickia mensalis Daly
- Trattinnickia panamensis Standl. & L.O.Williams
- Trattinnickia peruviana Loes.
- Trattinnickia rhenocaulis Daly & M.F.F.Melo
- Trattinnickia rhoifolia Willd.
- Trattinnickia vacciniiflora Daly & M.F.F.Melo
- Trattinnickia vulturina Daly & M.F.F.Melo

The genus name of Trattinnickia is in honour of Leopold Trattinnick (1764–1849), an Austrian botanist and mycologist. It was first described and published in Sp. Pl. edition.4 Vol.4 on page 975 in 1806.
