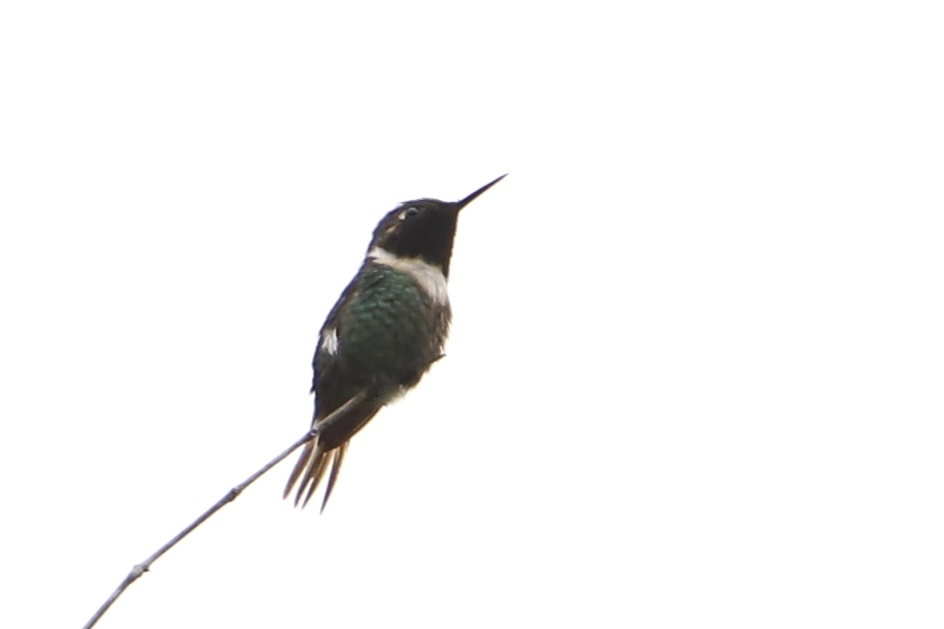

Conservation status
- Least Concern (IUCN 3.1)
- CITES Appendix II

Scientific classification
- Kingdom: Animalia
- Phylum: Chordata
- Class: Aves
- Order: Apodiformes
- Family: Trochilidae
- Genus: Chaetocercus
- Species: C. jourdanii

Binomial name
- Chaetocercus jourdanii (Bourcier, 1839)

= Rufous-shafted woodstar =

Species of hummingbird

The rufous-shafted woodstar (Chaetocercus jourdanii) is a species of hummingbird in tribe Mellisugini of subfamily Trochilinae, the "bee hummingbirds". It is found in Colombia, Trinidad and Tobago, and Venezuela.

== Taxonomy and systematics ==
The rufous-shafted woodstar was formally described in 1839 by the French ornithologist Jules Bourcier based on specimens collected in Trinidad. Bourcier placed the new species in the genus Ornismya and coined the binomial name Ornismya jourdanii. The species is now placed in the genus Chaetocercus that was introduced in 1855 by the English zoologist George Robert Gray with the rufous-shafted woodstar as the type species. The genus name is a combination of the Ancient Greek words khaitē, meaning "hair" and kerkos, meaning "tail". The specific epithet was chosen by Bourcier to honour the French zoologist Claude Jourdan.

Three subspecies are recognised:

- C. j. andinus Phelps, WH & Phelps, WH Jr, 1949 – northeast Colombia and west Venezuela
- C. j. rosae (Bourcier & Mulsant, 1846) – north Venezuela
- C. j. jourdanii (Bourcier, 1839) – northeast Venezuela and Trinidad

== Description ==
The rufous-shafted woodstar is 6 to 8 cm (2.4 to 3.1 in) long. Both sexes of all subspecies have a straight black bill and white patches on their flanks behind the wing. Males of the subspecies differ only in the color of their gorget: violet in the nominate, rosy crimson in C. j. rosae, and a less purple rosy in C. j. andinus. Females do not differ across the subspecies. Males have bottle green upperparts, a white breast, and a green belly. Their tail is deeply forked; the feathers are black with orange shafts. Females are bronzy green above and rufous below. The tail has two rounded "lobes"; the central feathers are green and the others cinnamon with a dark bar near the end.

The male rufous-shafted woodstar sings "a rising 3–4-note 'tssit, tssit, tssit, tssit'" from a treetop perch. As of July 2020, Cornell Lab of Ornithology's Macaulay Library has very few recordings of the species and xeno-canto has none.

== Distribution and habitat ==
The nominate subspecies of rufous-shafted woodstar is found in northeastern Venezuela's Sucre and Monagas states and, according to some taxonomies, in Trinidad as well. However, the South American Classification Committee of the American Ornithological Society lists it as resident in Venezuela but only a vagrant to Trinidad. Subspecies C. j. rosae is found in northern Venezuela between the states of Falcón and Miranda. C. j. andinus is found in the Sierra de Perijá that straddles the border between Colombia and Venezuela, the eastern Andes of Colombia, and the Andes of Venezuela between Táchira and Lara states.

The rufous-shafted woodstar inhabits semi-open and open landscapes such as scrublands, the edge of montane forest, and coffee plantations; it occasionally visits the lower parts of the páramo. In elevation it ranges between 900 and 3,000 m (3,000 and 9,800 ft), though there is some question about the accuracy of records higher than 2,500 m (8,200 ft). At least in Venezuela, the rufous-shafted woodstar is known to move between higher elevations in the dry season and lower ones in the rainy season.

== Behavior ==
=== Food and feeding ===
The rufous-shafted woodstar forages at all levels of the vegetation, but more often between the middle and upper strata. It takes nectar from a variety of flowering plants and trees such as Inga. It also eats small arthropods. It does not defend feeding territories, and because of its small size and slow bumblebee-like flight it is sometimes able to feed in the territories of other hummingbirds.

=== Breeding ===
Almost nothing is known about the rufous-shafted woodstar's breeding phenology. Observations in Colombia indicate that its breeding season there includes November.

== Status ==
The IUCN has assessed the white-bellied woodstar as being of Least Concern. It has a fairly large range, and though its population size is not known it is believed to be stable. It is considered rare to locally common. No immediate threats are known, and it "seems to accept man-made habitats like plantations."
