= Panicle =

Botanical term for highly-branched flower clusters

Diagram of a panicle

In botany, a panicle is a much-branched inflorescence. Some authors distinguish it from a compound spike inflorescence, by requiring that the flowers (and fruit) be pedicellate (having a single stem per flower). The branches of a panicle are often racemes. A panicle may have determinate or indeterminate growth.

This type of inflorescence is largely characteristic of grasses, such as oat and crabgrass, (Note: Technically, the inflorescence unit in a grass is the spikelet, but the arrangement of spikelets may be described as a panicle.) as well as other plants such as pistachio and mamoncillo. Botanists use the term paniculate in two ways: "having a true panicle inflorescence" (Note: "In the form of a panicle") as well as "having an inflorescence with the form but not necessarily the structure of a panicle".

== Corymb ==
A corymb may have a paniculate branching structure, with the lower flowers having longer pedicels than the upper, thus giving a flattish top superficially resembling an umbel. Many species in the subfamily Amygdaloideae, such as hawthorns and rowans, produce their flowers in corymbs.

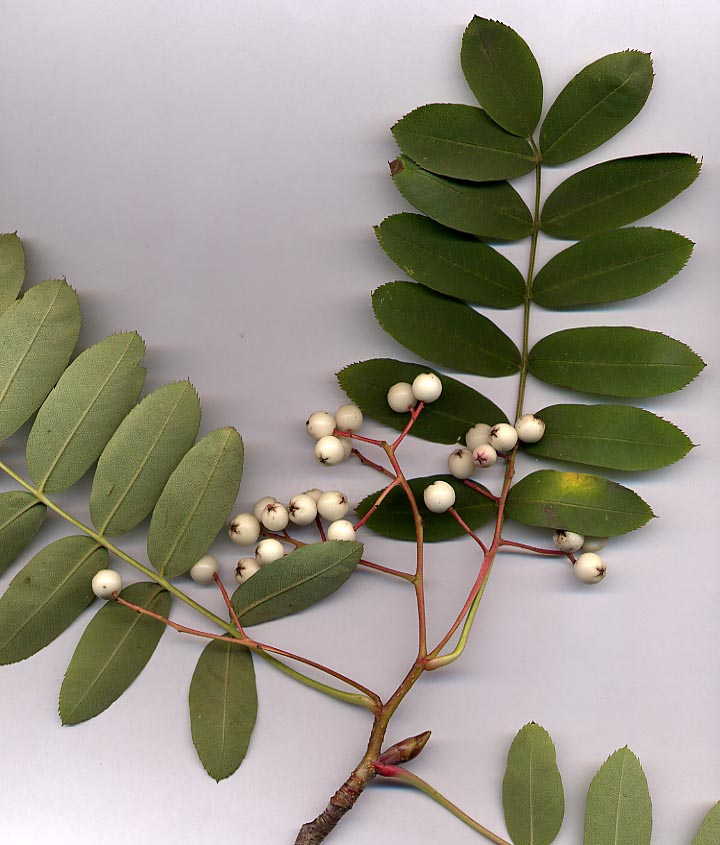
Sorbus glabrescens corymb with fruit

== See also ==
- Sheath grass belongs to the genus Coleanthus in the sweet grass family
- Thyrse, a branched inflorescence where the main axis has indeterminate growth, and the branches have determinate growth
