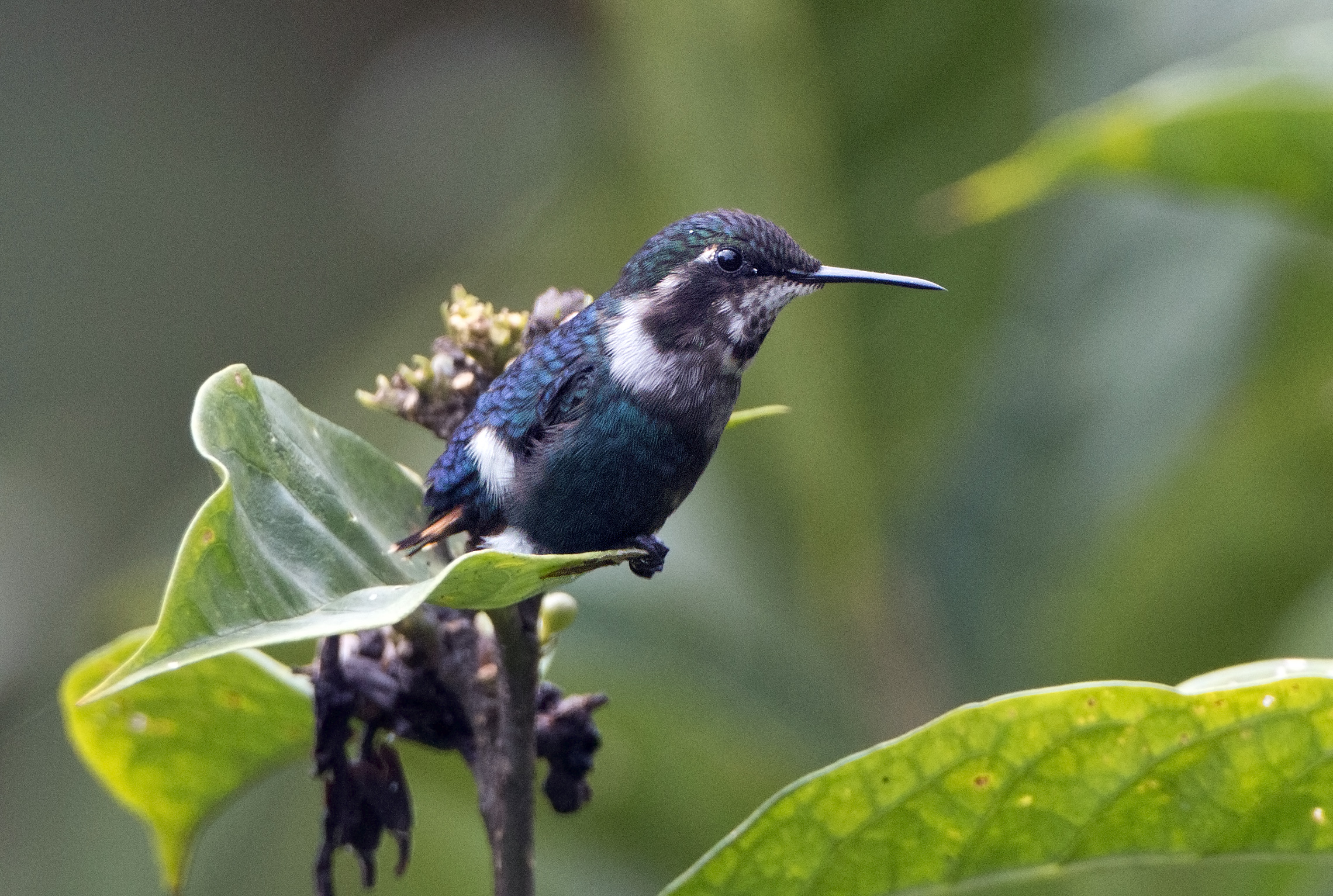
- Male, Macas Ecuador
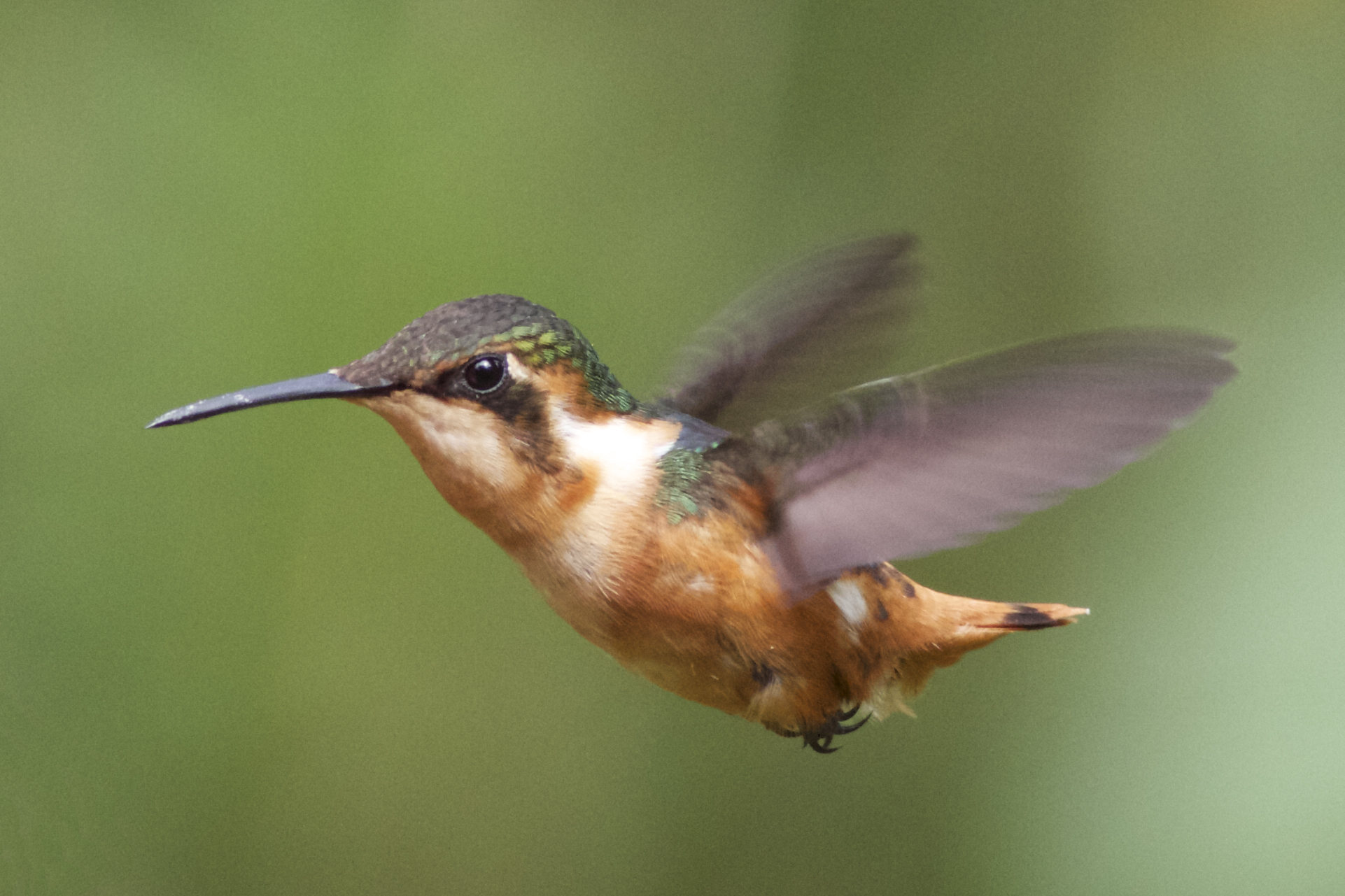
- Female in NW Ecuador

Conservation status
- Least Concern (IUCN 3.1)
- CITES Appendix II

Scientific classification
- Kingdom: Animalia
- Phylum: Chordata
- Class: Aves
- Order: Apodiformes
- Family: Trochilidae
- Genus: Chaetocercus
- Species: C. heliodor

Binomial name
- Chaetocercus heliodor (Bourcier, 1840)

Synonyms
- Acestrura heliodor

= Gorgeted woodstar =

Species of hummingbird

The gorgeted woodstar (Chaetocercus heliodor) is a species of hummingbird in tribe Mellisugini of subfamily Trochilinae, the "bee hummingbirds". It is found in Colombia, Ecuador, and Venezuela.

== Taxonomy and systematics ==
The gorgeted woodstar and several other species in genus Chaetocercus were formerly placed in genus Acestrura but have been in their current position since the late 20th century. It has two subspecies, the nominate C. h. heliodor and C. h. cleavesi.

== Description ==
The gorgeted woodstar is 5.8 to 6.4 cm (2.3 to 2.5 in) long. It is the smallest woodstar, a group of species that collectively are among the world's smallest birds. Both sexes have a straight black bill. The nominate male is mostly dark metallic blue-green. It has a pinkish purple gorget that extends across the neck, a grayish line behind the eye, a grayish breast, and white spots on the flanks. The tail is forked, with very short central feathers and outer ones that are bare shafts. The nominate female's upperparts are bronzy green with a rufous rump. Its underparts are cinnamon-rufous and its rounded tail is cinnamon with a black bar near the end. Males of subspecies C. h. cleavesi are darker than the nominate, with a less purplish gorget and a shorter tail.

== Distribution and habitat ==
The nominate subspecies of gorgeted woodstar is found in the Andes from Venezuela's Mérida state south through Colombia into western Ecuador. C. h. cleavesi is found in the Andes of northeastern Ecuador between Sucumbíos and Morona-Santiago provinces. The species inhabits semi-open to open landscapes such as the edges of humid forest, coffee plantations, and areas with some trees and shrubs; it occasionally visits the lower parts of the páramo. In elevation it ranges between 1,200 and 3,000 m (3,900 and 9,800 ft).

== Behavior ==
=== Movement ===
The gorgeted woodstar's movements, if any, are not known but seasonal elevational changes are thought likely.

=== Feeding ===
The gorgeted woodstar forages for nectar from vegetation's middle strata to the canopy; one important source is the flowers of Inga trees. It does not defend feeding territories, and because of its small size and slow bumblebee-like flight is sometimes able to feed in the territories of other hummingbirds. In addition to feeding on nectar, it captures small insects by hawking from a perch.

=== Breeding ===
At least in parts of Colombia, the gorgeted woodstar's breeding season extends from April to October. It builds a cup nest of soft plant material with lichens, leaf pieces, and small twigs on the outside. The nest is attached with spiderweb to a vertical or horizontal branch. No other information is known about its breeding phenology.

=== Vocalization ===
The gorgeted woodstar makes "a single dry 'chit', doubled 'chichit' or tripled 'chichichit'" calls while hovering or feeding.

== Status ==
The IUCN has assessed the gorgeted woodstar as being of Least Concern. It has a fairly large range, and though its population size is not known it is believed to be stable. It is considered rare to locally common in various parts of its range but may be more common than thought because of its small size and inconspicuous behavior.
