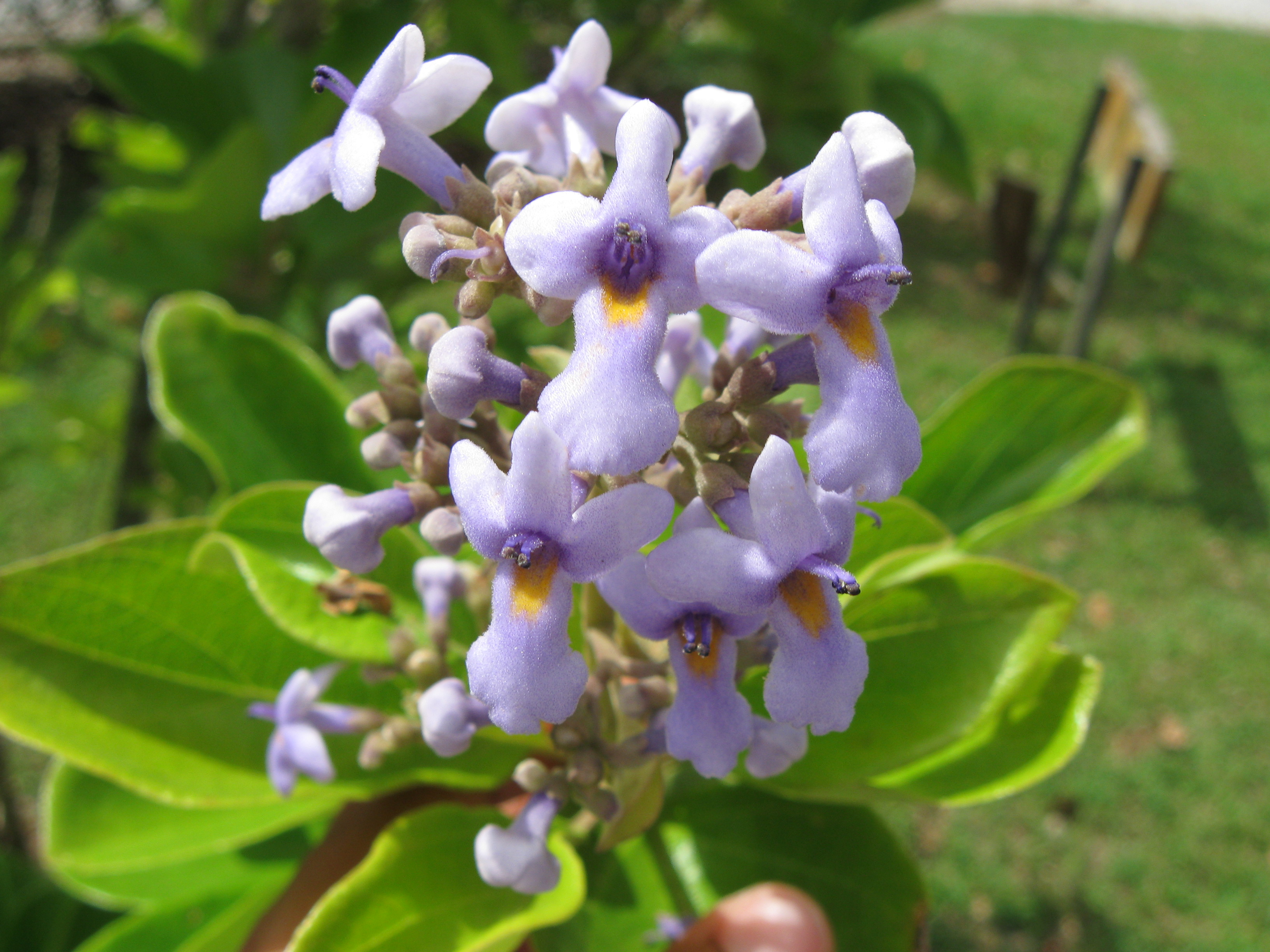
- Flowers of Cornutia obovata

Scientific classification
- Kingdom: Plantae
- Clade: Tracheophytes
- Clade: Angiosperms
- Clade: Eudicots
- Clade: Asterids
- Order: Lamiales
- Family: Lamiaceae
- Subfamily: Viticoideae
- Genus: Cornutia; Plum. ex L.

Synonyms
- Agnanthus Vaill. ex L. 1753; Hosta Jacq. 1797; Hostana Pers. 1805

= Cornutia =

Genus of flowering plants

Cornutia is a genus of plants in the family Lamiaceae, first described in 1753. Species in this genus are native to tropical parts of the Western Hemisphere, including southern Mexico, Central America, the West Indies, and northern South America.

== Species ==
This genus includes the following species:

- Cornutia australis Moldenke - Ecuador, Brazil
- Cornutia coerulea (Jacq.) Moldenke - Jamaica
- Cornutia jamaicensis Moldenke - Jamaica
- Cornutia obovata Urb. - Puerto Rico
- Cornutia odorata (Poepp.) Schauer - Venezuela, Colombia, Ecuador, Peru
- Cornutia pubescens C.F.Gaertn. - French Guiana
- Cornutia pyramidata L. - southern Mexico (Veracruz, Tabasco, Oaxaca, Yucatán Peninsula, Chiapas), Central America, West Indies, Suriname, Venezuela, Colombia, Ecuador, Peru
- Cornutia thyrsoidea Banks ex Moldenke - Jamaica
