= Franz Wilibald Schmidt =

Franz Wilibald Schmidt (7 July 1764 – 2 February 1796) was a Czech-German botanist and plant artist. He taught botany at the University of Prague but died young. The genus Schmidtia (Asteraceae) is named in his honour.

== Life ==
Schmidt was born in Planá, in a family of German-speaking artists. He too became skilled in art and took an interest in plants. He studied at the monastery school in Teplá and then went to the University of Prague where he received a philosophy degree and then a medical degree in 1793. He was made professor of botany at the University of Prague. He also headed a private botanical garden and school sponsored by Count Malabaila de Canal. He published notes on a number of plant species, including several new descriptions, mainly in a series titled Flora Boemica inchoata. He also made a number of drawings and watercolours. He died from a fever at the age of 32. His herbarium was deposited at Prague.
