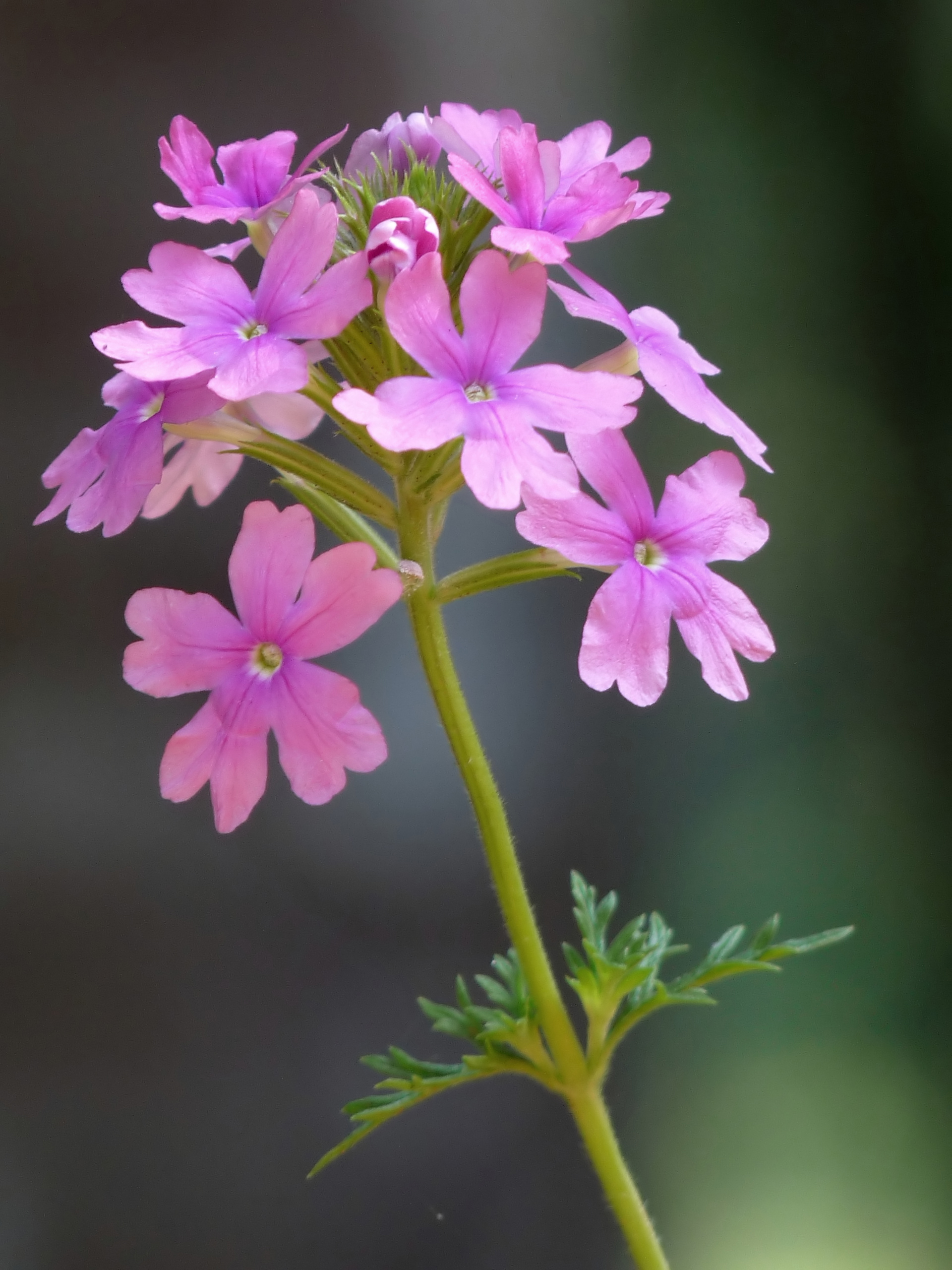
- Glandularia pulchella

Scientific classification
- Kingdom: Plantae
- Clade: Tracheophytes
- Clade: Angiosperms
- Clade: Eudicots
- Clade: Asterids
- Order: Lamiales
- Family: Verbenaceae
- Genus: Glandularia; J.F.Gmel.

Type species
- Glandularia caroliniensis J.F.Gmel.

Synonyms
- Verbena sect. Glandularia (J.F.Gmel.) Schauer; Verbena subg. Glandularia (J.F.Gmel.) Nutt.; Verbena subg. Glandularia (J.F.Gmel.) Lewis

= Glandularia =

Genus of plants

Glandularia, commonly called mock vervain, is a genus of plants in the family Verbenaceae. It contains 90 species, all of which are native to the Americas, although some have naturalised in other parts of the world. Glandularia was previously treated as a synonym of a subgenus of Verbena.

== Species ==
The following species are accepted:

- Glandularia alejandrana B.L.Turner
- Glandularia amoena (Paxton) Umber
- Glandularia andalgalensis (Moldenke) P.Peralta
- Glandularia angustilobata (Moldenke) P.Peralta & V.Thode
- Glandularia araucana (Phil.) Botta
- Glandularia aristigera (S.Moore) Tronc.
- Glandularia atacamensis (Reiche) J.M.Watson & A.E.Hoffm.
- Glandularia aurantiaca (Speg.) Botta
- Glandularia bajacalifornica (Moldenke) Umber
- Glandularia balansae (Briq.) N.O'Leary
- Glandularia berteroi (Schauer) Muñoz-Schick
- Glandularia bipinnatifida Nutt.
- Glandularia brachyrhynchos G.L.Nesom & Vorobik
- Glandularia cabrerae (Moldenke) Botta
- Glandularia canadensis (L.) Small
- Glandularia catharinae (Moldenke) N.O'Leary & P.Peralta
- Glandularia cheitmaniana (Moldenke) Botta & Poggio
- Glandularia chiricahensis Umber
- Glandularia ciliata (Benth.) Botta
- Glandularia corymbosa (Ruiz & Pav.) N.O'Leary & P.Peralta
- Glandularia cuneifolia (Ruiz & Pav.) O'Leary & Múlgura
- Glandularia cunha (Vell.) G.Santos, V.Thode & J.F.B.Pastore
- Glandularia delticola (Small ex Perry) Umber
- Glandularia dissecta (Willd. ex Spreng.) Schnack & Covas
- Glandularia dusenii (Moldenke) N.O'Leary & P.Peralta
- Glandularia elegans (Kunth) Umber
- Glandularia flava (Gillies & Hook.) Schnack & Covas
- Glandularia gooddingii (Briq.) Solbrig
- Glandularia guaibensis P.Peralta & V.Thode
- Glandularia guaranitica Tronc.
- Glandularia gynobasis (Wedd.) N.O'Leary & P.Peralta
- Glandularia hassleriana (Briq.) Tronc.
- Glandularia hatschbachii (Moldenke) N.O'Leary & P.Peralta
- Glandularia herteri (Moldenke) Tronc.
- Glandularia humifusa (Cham.) Botta
- Glandularia jordanensis (Moldenke) N.O'Leary & P.Peralta
- Glandularia kuntzeana (Moldenke) Tronc.
- Glandularia laciniata (L.) Schnack & Covas
- Glandularia landbeckii (Phil.) P.Peralta
- Glandularia latilobata (L.M.Perry) G.L.Nesom
- Glandularia lilacina (Greene) Umber
- Glandularia lilloana (Moldenke) Botta
- Glandularia lipozygioides (Walp.) L.E.Navas
- Glandularia lobata (Vell.) P.Peralta & V.Thode
- Glandularia longidentata (L.M.Perry) G.L.Nesom
- Glandularia macrosperma (Speg.) Tronc.
- Glandularia malpaisana T.Van Devender & G.L.Nesom
- Glandularia maritima (Small) Small
- Glandularia marrubioides (Cham.) Tronc.
- Glandularia megapotamica (Spreng.) Cabrera & G.Dawson
- Glandularia mendocina (Phil.) Covas & Schnack
- Glandularia microphylla (Kunth) Cabrera
- Glandularia multiglandulosa (Moldenke) P.Peralta
- Glandularia nana (Moldenke) Tronc.
- Glandularia paraguariensis (Moldenke) N.O'Leary
- Glandularia parodii Covas & Schnack
- Glandularia paulensis (Moldenke) A.L.R.Oliveira & Salimena
- Glandularia peruviana (L.) Small
- Glandularia platensis (Spreng.) Schnack & Covas
- Glandularia polyantha Umber
- Glandularia porrigens (Phil.) J.M.Watson & A.E.Hoffm.
- Glandularia pubera (Greene) G.L.Nesom
- Glandularia pumila (Rydb.) Umber
- Glandularia quadrangulata (A.Heller) Umber
- Glandularia racemosa (Eggert) Umber
- Glandularia radicans Schnack & Covas
- Glandularia rectiloba (Moldenke) P.Peralta & V.Thode
- Glandularia ribifolia (Walp.) P.Peralta
- Glandularia rupestri V.Thode & Bordignon
- Glandularia santiaguensis Covas & Schnack
- Glandularia scrobiculata (Griseb.) Tronc.
- Glandularia selloi (Spreng.) Tronc.
- Glandularia sessilifolia V.Thode & Bordignon
- Glandularia sessilis (Cham.) Tronc.
- Glandularia stellarioides (Cham.) Schnack & Covas
- Glandularia subincana Tronc.
- Glandularia subpetiolata (N.O'Leary) P.H.Cardoso & V.Thode
- Glandularia sulphurea (D.Don) Schnack & Covas
- Glandularia tampensis (Nash) Small
- Glandularia tecticaulis (Tronc.) N.O'Leary
- Glandularia tenera (Spreng.) Cabrera
- Glandularia teucriifolia (M.Martens & Galeotti) Umber
- Glandularia thymoides (Cham.) N.O'Leary
- Glandularia tomophylla (Briq.) P.Peralta
- Glandularia tumidula (L.M.Perry) Umber
- Glandularia turneri G.L.Nesom
- Glandularia tweedieana (Niven ex Hook.) P.Peralta
- Glandularia × uruguayensis (Moldenke) ined.
- Glandularia venturii (Moldenke) Botta
- Glandularia verecunda Umber
- Glandularia wrightii (A.Gray) Umber
