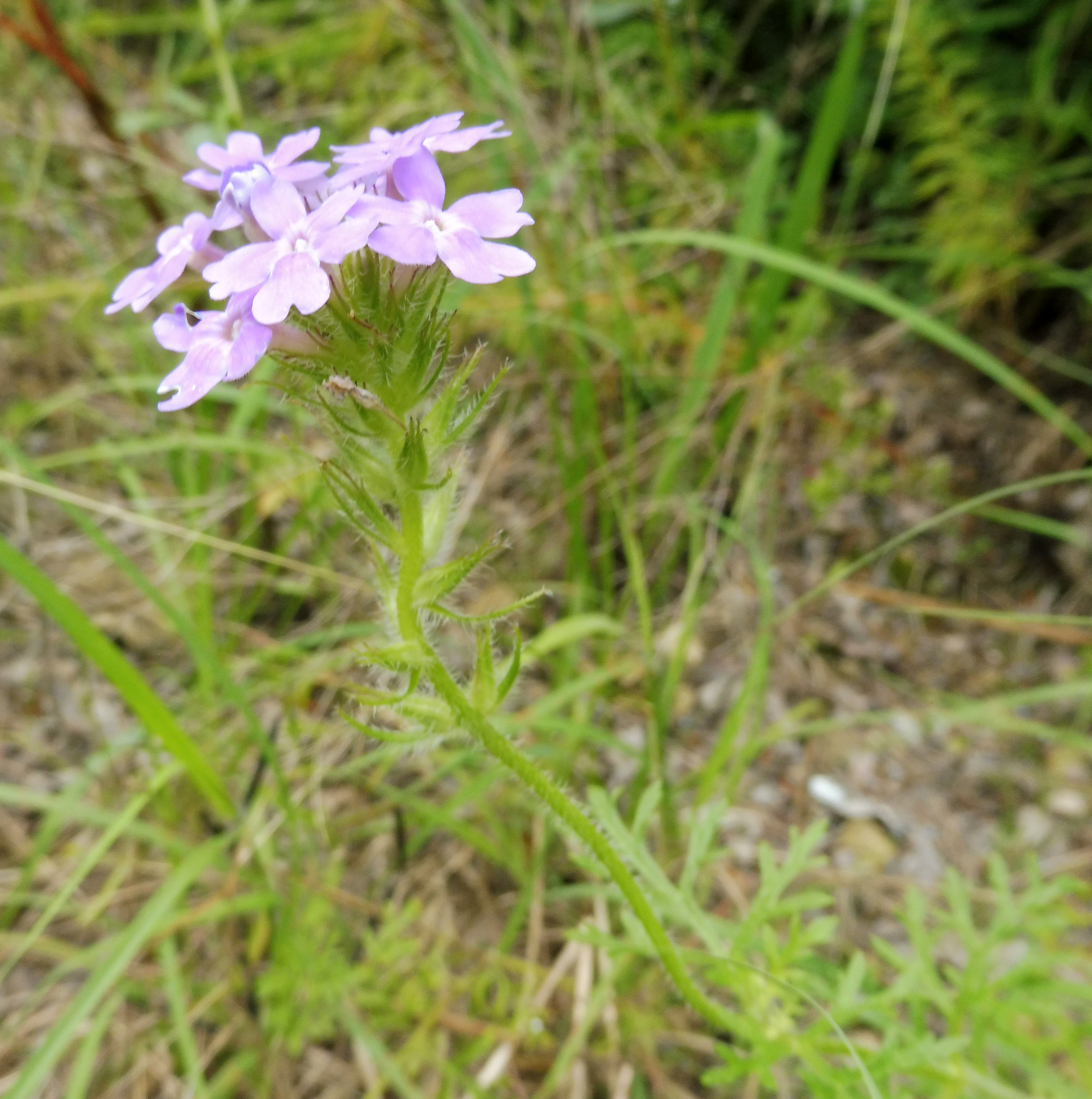

Scientific classification
- Kingdom: Plantae
- Clade: Tracheophytes
- Clade: Angiosperms
- Clade: Eudicots
- Clade: Asterids
- Order: Lamiales
- Family: Verbenaceae
- Genus: Verbena
- Species: V. bipinnatifida

Binomial name
- Verbena bipinnatifida Schauer

Synonyms
- Glandularia bipinnatifida (Schauer) Nutt.

= Verbena bipinnatifida =

Species of flowering plant

Verbena bipinnatifida, commonly called Dakota mock vervain, prairie verbena, and Moradilla, among others, is a species of flowering plant in the verbena family Verbenaceae.

== Description ==
Verbena bipinnatifida is an herbaceous or semi-woody perennial. It produces pink or purple flowers primarily in the spring, but can bloom anytime throughout the growing season. Its leaves are finely dissected, into segments that are 1–4 mm wide. It can be distinguished from the similar-looking Verbena tenera by its long flower bracts, and wider leaf segments.

== Distribution and habitat ==
It is native to North America, where its natural range extends from the United States south to Nicaragua. In the United States, it is found primarily in the Great Plains and in the Blackland Prairies of the Southeast. Elsewhere in North America, it is occasionally found as a non-persisting waif. Its natural habitat is in open grassy areas, including prairies. It can be found in both high-quality natural communities and in disturbed areas.
