= Sphenodesme thorelii =

Scientific classification
- Kingdom: Plantae
- Clade: Tracheophytes
- Clade: Angiosperms
- Clade: Eudicots
- Clade: Asterids
- Order: Lamiales
- Family: Lamiaceae
- Subfamily: Symphorematoideae
- Genus: Sphenodesme
- Species: S. thorelii

Binomial name
- Sphenodesme thorelii Dop, 1915

Synonyms
- Sphenodesma thorelii Dop

Species of flowering plant

Sphenodesme thorelii is the accepted name of a species of small liana in the genus Sphenodesme (family Lamiaceae). This species is named after the French botanist Clovis Thorel and found in southern Vietnam, where it may be called bội tinh Thorel.
