= Priva socotrana =

Conservation status
- Least Concern (IUCN 3.1)

Scientific classification
- Kingdom: Plantae
- Clade: Tracheophytes
- Clade: Angiosperms
- Clade: Eudicots
- Clade: Asterids
- Order: Lamiales
- Family: Verbenaceae
- Genus: Priva
- Species: P. socotrana

Binomial name
- Priva socotrana Moldenke (1936)

Species of flowering plant

Priva socotrana is a species of plant in the family Verbenaceae. It is a subshrub endemic to the islands of Socotra and Samhah in Yemen's Socotra Archipelago. It is common and widespread in dry shrublands and woodlands on limestone escarpments and plateaus from 50 to 950 metres elevation.
