= Samuel J. Record =

American botanist & academic (1881–1945)

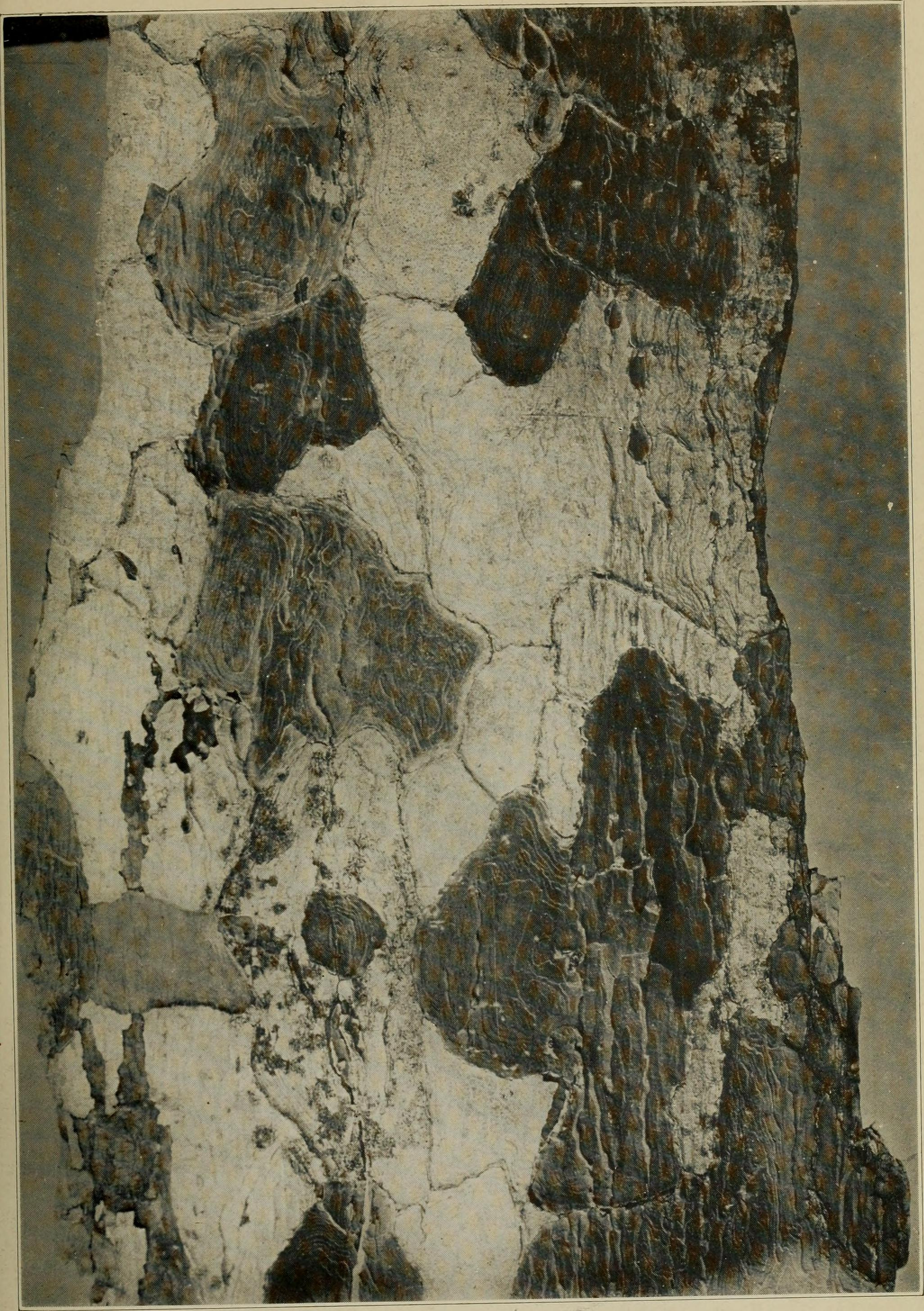
Image from Lignum-vitae; a study of the woods of the Zygophyllaceae with reference to the true lignum-vitae of commerce-its sources, properties, uses, and substitutes (1921) by Samuel James Record.

Samuel James Record (10 March 1881 – 3 February 1945) was an American botanist who played a prominent role in the study of wood.

Born at Crawfordsville, Indiana, Record graduated from Wabash College in 1903 and received a Master of Forestry degree from Yale University in 1905. After working for the US Forest Service he joined the faculty of the Yale School of Forestry in 1910. In 1917 he became Professor of forest products, and in 1939 was made Dean of the school.

Record in 1908

In 1934, botanist Moldenke published Recordia, a genus of flowering plants from Bolivia and Brazil, belonging to the family Verbenaceae and named in Samuel J. Record's honour. Also in the same year, Adolpho Ducke published Recordoxylon, a genus of flowering plants from northern South America in the legume family, Fabaceae.

Through field trips around the Americas (most notably Belize, Guatemala, Honduras, Colombia and of course the US) and help from correspondents all over the world, Samuel Record amassed a collection of some 41 000 identified wood specimens. Originally housed at Yale, the SJRw collection was moved in 1969 to the US Forest Service's Forest Products Laboratory. He was a founder of the International Society of Wood Anatomists and started publishing the journal Tropical Woods in 1925.
