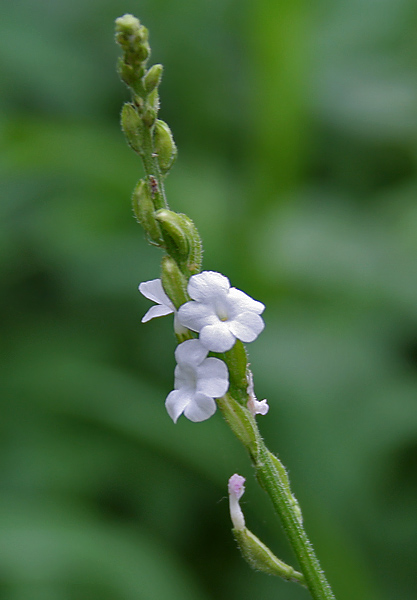
- Priva cordifolia syn Priva leptostachya in Talakona forest, in Chittoor District of Andhra Pradesh, India.

Scientific classification
- Kingdom: Plantae
- Clade: Tracheophytes
- Clade: Angiosperms
- Clade: Eudicots
- Clade: Asterids
- Order: Lamiales
- Family: Verbenaceae
- Genus: Priva; Adans.

Synonyms
- Busseria Cramer; Blairia Houst. ex Adans.; Phryma Forssk.; Streptium Roxb.; Tortula Roxb. ex Willd.

= Priva =

Genus of plants

Priva is a genus of plant in the family Verbenaceae, also known as Velvetburs. The plant was first described by Adanson in 1763. It is native to the tropics in large regions of Africa, Asia, and America.

== Description ==
Priva cordifolia botanical drawing.

Priva grow as annual or perennial herbs or small subshrubs. Stems are usually four-angled in cross-section view and may be covered in trichomes in various ways, short/soft, rough or distinctively hooked. Leaves are simple, opposite, membranous, typically with both sides of the lamina carrying trichomes. In some species glandular hair sit along the veins. Leaf blades can be ovate, lanceolate or acuminate with the base being rounded, truncate, oblique or cunate. Leaf margins can be crenate, serrate or serrate-dentate.

The inflorescences are terminal or axillary racemes, which often grow relatively slender and elongated. Flowers sit on short stalks (pedicells) and are usually accompanied by bracts. Flowers are zygomorphic, often described as 4-merous. The calyx forms a tubular structure that ends in five teeth or lobes and commonly persists or becomes conspicuously inflated around the developing fruit. The corolla also has a tube-like shape with four or five lobes, and can be white, lilac, pink, blue or purple in color. The fruit is a small schizocarp with two mericarps, which in some species can have two longitudinal rows of spines.

== Distribution ==
The genus Priva has a vast distribution range spanning three continents (America, Africa, Asia). Covering different geographical patterns in the tropical regions of each continent. Throughout the Americas the genus can be found from the southern most states of the US in the north to the northern provinces of Argentina in the south. In Africa different species of Priva occure ranging from Egypt in the north, to DRC (central Africa) all the way to South Africa, mostly on the eastern side of the continent as well as Madagaskar. The Asian distribution range seems to be focused on south Asia (from Pakistan, to Bangladesh, to Sri Lanka) but also includes an area of the Arabian peninsula, where species can be found in Jemen and Oman. The genus is considered to be introduced in Galápagos and around the Gulf of Guinea.

== Systematics ==
Within the family Verbenaceae the genus Priva is placed in the tribe Priveae, which only contains one additional monotypic taxon (Pitraea) to which it is closely related. Priva contains 23 species as of 2026.

Priva lappulacea plant in habitat. Viard in Sainte-Rose on Guadeloupe.

=== Species ===
- Priva adhaerens (Forssk.) Chiov.
- Priva africana Moldenke
- Priva armata S.Watson
- Priva aspera Kunth
- Priva auricoccea A.Meeuse
- Priva bahiensis Schauer
- Priva boliviana Moldenke
- Priva cordifolia (L.f.) Druce
- Priva curtisiae Kobuski
- Priva domingensis Urb.
- Priva favargeri R.Fern.
- Priva flabelliformis (Moldenke) R.Fern.
- Priva grandiflora (Ortega) Moldenke
- Priva humbertii Moldenke
- Priva ibugana Rzed. & Calderón
- Priva laciniata Moldenke
- Priva lappulacea (L.) Pers.
- Priva mexicana (L.) Pers.
- Priva meyeri Jaub. & Spach
- Priva pedicellata Moldenke
- Priva peruviana Moldenke
- Priva portoricensis Urb.
- Priva socotrana Moldenke

== Gallery ==
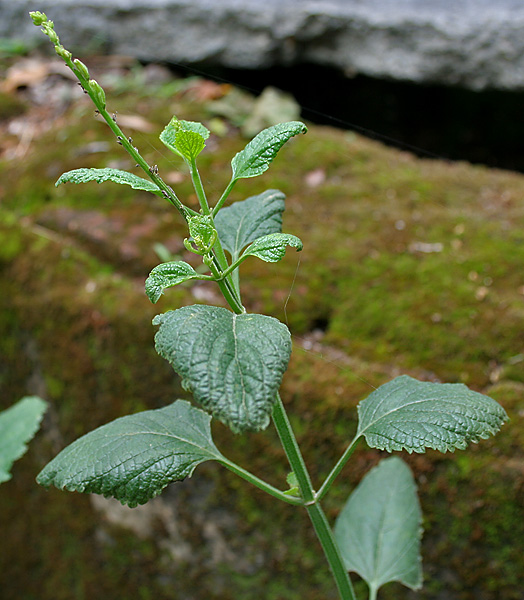
Priva cordifolia syn Priva leptostachya in Talakona forest, in Chittoor District of Andhra Pradesh, India.

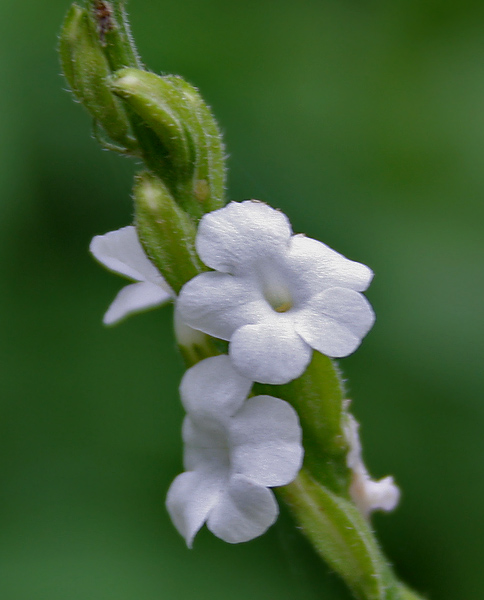
Priva cordifolia syn Priva leptostachya in Talakona forest, in Chittoor District of Andhra Pradesh, India.

Priva adhaerens Inflorescence.

Priva cordifolia var abyssinica, Flowers, Skeerpoort.
