= Priva auricoccea =

Conservation status
- Data Deficient (IUCN 3.1)

Scientific classification
- Kingdom: Plantae
- Clade: Tracheophytes
- Clade: Angiosperms
- Clade: Eudicots
- Clade: Asterids
- Order: Lamiales
- Family: Verbenaceae
- Genus: Priva
- Species: P. auricoccea

Binomial name
- Priva auricoccea A.Meeuse

Species of shrub

Priva auricoccea is a species of plant in the family Verbenaceae. It is endemic to Namibia. Its natural habitat is subtropical or tropical dry shrubland. It is threatened by habitat loss.
