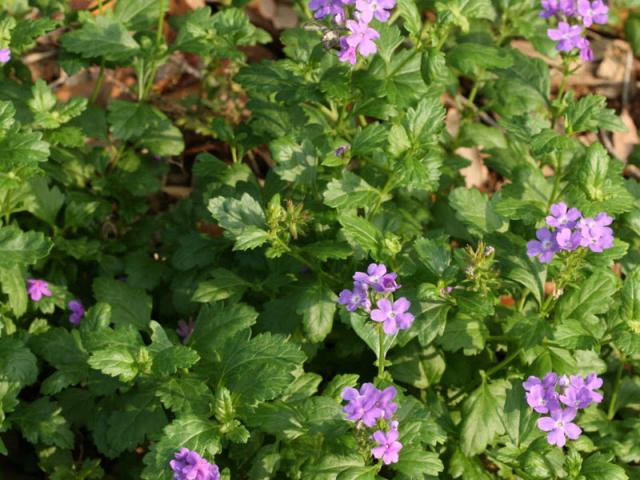

Conservation status
- Imperiled (NatureServe)

Scientific classification
- Kingdom: Plantae
- Clade: Tracheophytes
- Clade: Angiosperms
- Clade: Eudicots
- Clade: Asterids
- Order: Lamiales
- Family: Verbenaceae
- Genus: Glandularia
- Species: G. tampensis

Binomial name
- Glandularia tampensis (Nash) Small

= Glandularia tampensis =

Species of flowering plant

Glandularia tampensis, common names Tampa mock-vervain and Tampa verbena, is a flowering plant in the Glandularia genus. It is a long-lived perennial with purple flowers. It grows in flatwoods, live oak-cabbage palm hammock and in clearings. It is endemic to Florida.
