= Sphenodesme pierrei =

Scientific classification
- Kingdom: Plantae
- Clade: Tracheophytes
- Clade: Angiosperms
- Clade: Eudicots
- Clade: Asterids
- Order: Lamiales
- Family: Lamiaceae
- Subfamily: Symphorematoideae
- Genus: Sphenodesme
- Species: S. pierrei

Binomial name
- Sphenodesme pierrei Dop, 1915

Synonyms
- Sphenodesma pierrei Dop

Species of flowering plant

Sphenodesme pierrei is the accepted name of a species of small liana in the genus Sphenodesme (family Lamiaceae). This species is found in southern Vietnam, where it may be called bội tinh Pierre.
