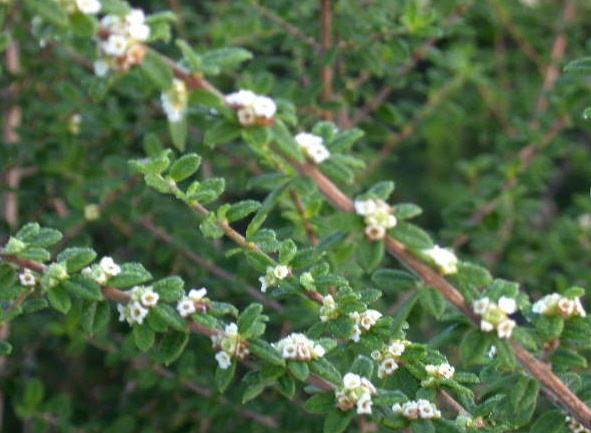

Scientific classification
- Kingdom: Plantae
- Clade: Tracheophytes
- Clade: Angiosperms
- Clade: Eudicots
- Clade: Asterids
- Order: Lamiales
- Family: Verbenaceae
- Genus: Nashia
- Species: N. inaguensis

Binomial name
- Nashia inaguensis Millsp.

= Nashia inaguensis =

Species of shrub

Nashia inaguensis is an evergreen shrub, commonly referred to as Moujean tea, Bahamas berry, or pineapple verbena. It is native to the east Caribbean islands, in particular the island of Inagua in the Bahamas, after which the species is named. In its native environment, the plant crawls along sunny, rocky outcroppings, semi-protected from steady high winds.

It is a loose, spreading shrub with many branches up to 2 m high, with mature trunks of 5–10 cm diameter. The leaves are aromatic, simple, opposite (or fascicled), elliptic to obovate or spatulate, 5–10 mm long, with revolute margins. The flowerheads are axillary, sessile, few-flowered, with a strigose calyx; the corolla is whitish, about 2 mm long, four-lobed, and with four stamens. The fragrant foliage and tiny white flowers are highly attractive to pollinators, in particular the Atala butterfly.

== Cultivation and uses ==
It is often used as a bonsai plant due to its miniaturized features. The flowers form in clusters and are followed by reddish orange berries. It prefers full sun, warmth (a minimum temperature of 5 °C) and must be kept under high humidity. Even a brief spell of dryness can kill the plant. It can be propagated from cuttings, preferably in the spring and early summer during warm nights. A decoction of the fragrant leaves, variously described as having the scent and flavor of citrus, vanilla, or pineapple, is used as an herbal tea.
