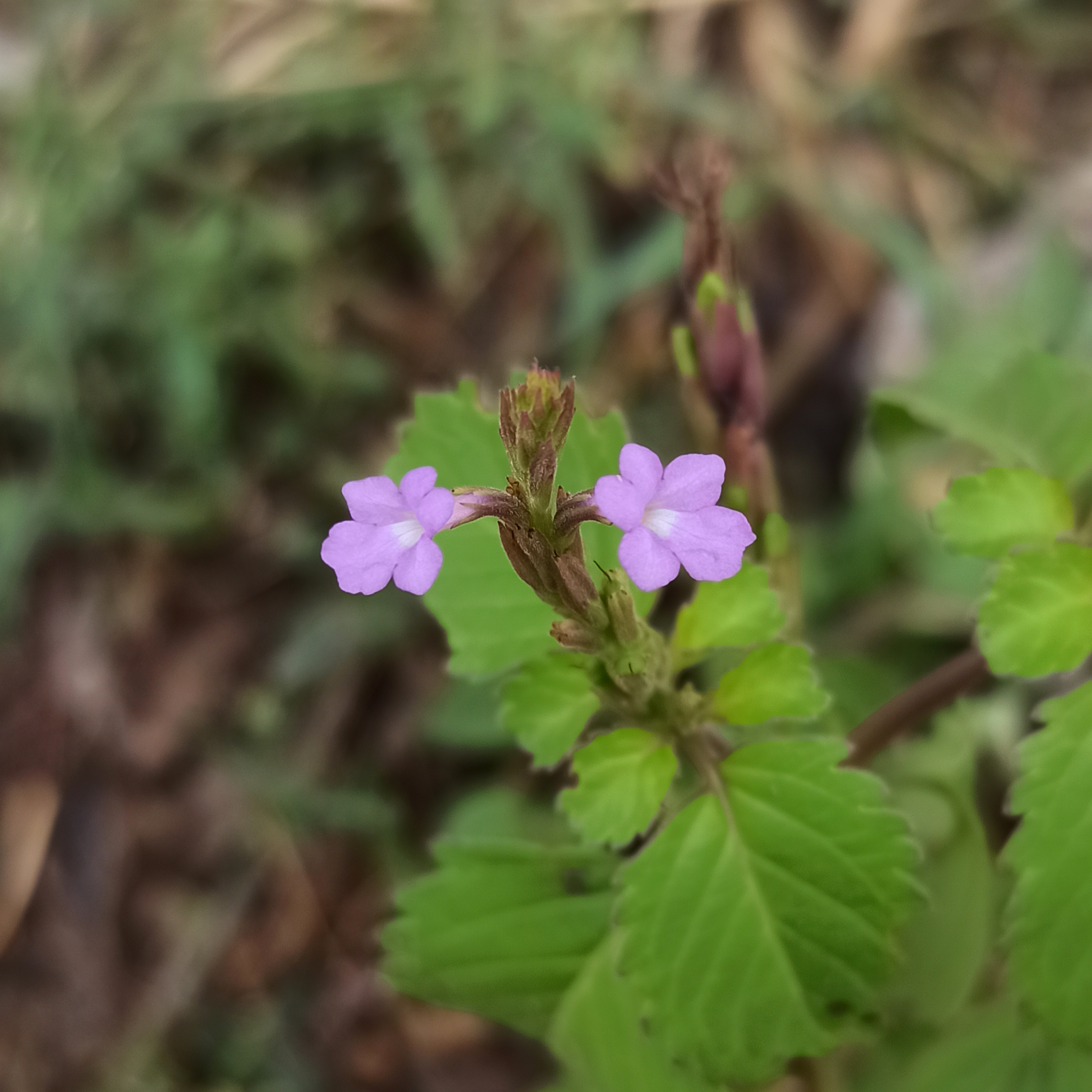
- Bouchea prismatica (L.) Kuntze

Scientific classification
- Kingdom: Plantae
- Clade: Tracheophytes
- Clade: Angiosperms
- Clade: Eudicots
- Clade: Asterids
- Order: Lamiales
- Family: Verbenaceae
- Genus: Bouchea; Cham.

= Bouchea =

Genus of flowering plants

Bouchea is a genus of flowering plant belonging to the family Verbenaceae.

Its native range is Tropical and Subtropical America.

Species:

- Bouchea agrestis Schauer
- Bouchea bifurca (Benth.) P.Moroni & N.O'Leary
- Bouchea boliviana (Kuntze) Moldenke
- Bouchea dissecta S.Watson
- Bouchea glabrata (Moldenke) P.Moroni & N.O'Leary
- Bouchea linifolia A.Gray ex Torr.
- Bouchea nelsonii Grenzeb.
- Bouchea notabilis Moldenke
- Bouchea prismatica (L.) Kuntze
- Bouchea pseudochascanum (Walp.) Grenzeb.
- Bouchea pseudogervao (A.St.-Hil.) Cham.
- Bouchea rusbyi Moldenke
- Bouchea spathulata Torr.
