= Hierobotana =

Scientific classification
- Kingdom: Plantae
- Clade: Tracheophytes
- Clade: Angiosperms
- Clade: Eudicots
- Clade: Asterids
- Order: Lamiales
- Family: Verbenaceae
- Genus: Hierobotana; Briq.
- Species: H. inflata

Binomial name
- Hierobotana inflata (Kunth) Briq.

Genus of plants

Hierobotana is a monotypic genus of flowering plants belonging to the family Verbenaceae. The only species is Hierobotana inflata.

Its native range is Western South America.
