= Rehdera =

Scientific classification
- Kingdom: Plantae
- Clade: Tracheophytes
- Clade: Angiosperms
- Clade: Eudicots
- Clade: Asterids
- Order: Lamiales
- Family: Verbenaceae
- Genus: Rehdera; Moldenke

Genus of flowering plant

Rehdera is a genus of flowering plants belonging to the family Verbenaceae.

Its native range is (south-eastern) Mexico to Central America, and it is found in Belize, Costa Rica, El Salvador, Guatemala, Honduras and Nicaragua.

The genus name of Rehdera is in honour of Alfred Rehder (1863–1949), a German-American botanical taxonomist and dendrologist who worked at the Arnold Arboretum of Harvard University. It was first described and published in Repert. Spec. Nov. Regni Veg. Vol.39 on page 48 in 1935.

== Known species ==
According to Kew:

- Rehdera penninervia Standl. & Moldenke
- Rehdera trinervis (S.F.Blake) Moldenke
