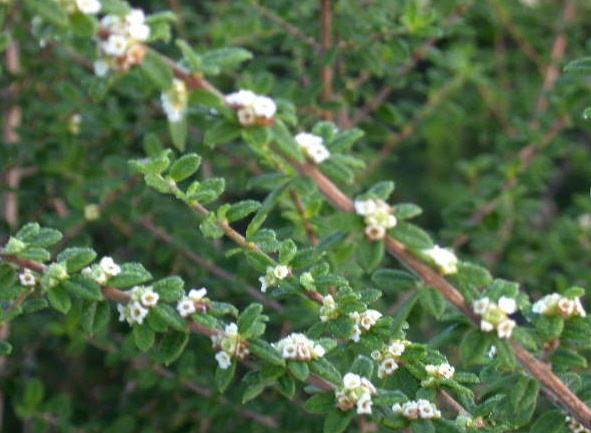
- Nashia inaguensis

Scientific classification
- Kingdom: Plantae
- Clade: Tracheophytes
- Clade: Angiosperms
- Clade: Eudicots
- Clade: Asterids
- Order: Lamiales
- Family: Verbenaceae
- Genus: Nashia; Millsp.

Species
- 7, see text

= Nashia =

Genus of flowering plants

Nashia is a genus of flowering plant in the vervain family, Verbenaceae.

== Classification and revision ==
Until recently, there were 7 known species to exist within the genus Nashia. However, the seven species placed in the genus Nashia were revised, based on the near totality of the (scant) material found in the world's herbaria. A morphological analysis of, in particular, the calyx and fruit reveals the heterogeneity of the genus. As a result, Nashia was reduced to its single original species, N. inaquensis, described from Great Inagua, Bahamas (where it's considered to have been introduced), and recently found in Puerto Rico and the Virgin Islands (St. Croix). N. spinifera, of Hispaniola, was placed in the genus Isidroa, a monotypic new genus.

== Diphllocalyx ==
The five Cuban endemics, plus two newly described here, make up the new genus Diphyllocalyx, formerly Lippia sect. Diphllocalyx of Grisebach.

== Species ==
Species include:

- Nashia armata (Urb.) Moldenke
- Nashia cayensis Britton
- Nashia inaguensis Millsp. – el tuque
- Nashia myrtifolia (Griseb.) Moldenke
- Nashia nipensis (Urb.) Moldenke
- Nashia spinifera (Urb.) Moldenke
- Nashia variifolia (Urb.) Moldenke
