= Recordia =

Scientific classification
- Kingdom: Plantae
- Clade: Tracheophytes
- Clade: Angiosperms
- Clade: Eudicots
- Clade: Asterids
- Order: Lamiales
- Family: Verbenaceae
- Genus: Recordia; Moldenke

Synonyms
- Verbenoxylum Tronc.

Genus of flowering plant

Recordia is a genus of flowering plants belonging to the family Verbenaceae.

It is native to Bolivia and southern Brazil.

The genus name of Recordia is in honour of Samuel J. Record (1881–1945), an American botanist who played a prominent role in the study of trees and wood. It was first described and published in Phytologia Vol.1 on page 99 in 1934.

Known species, according to Kew:

- Recordia boliviana Moldenke
- Recordia reitzii (Moldenke) Thode & O'Leary
