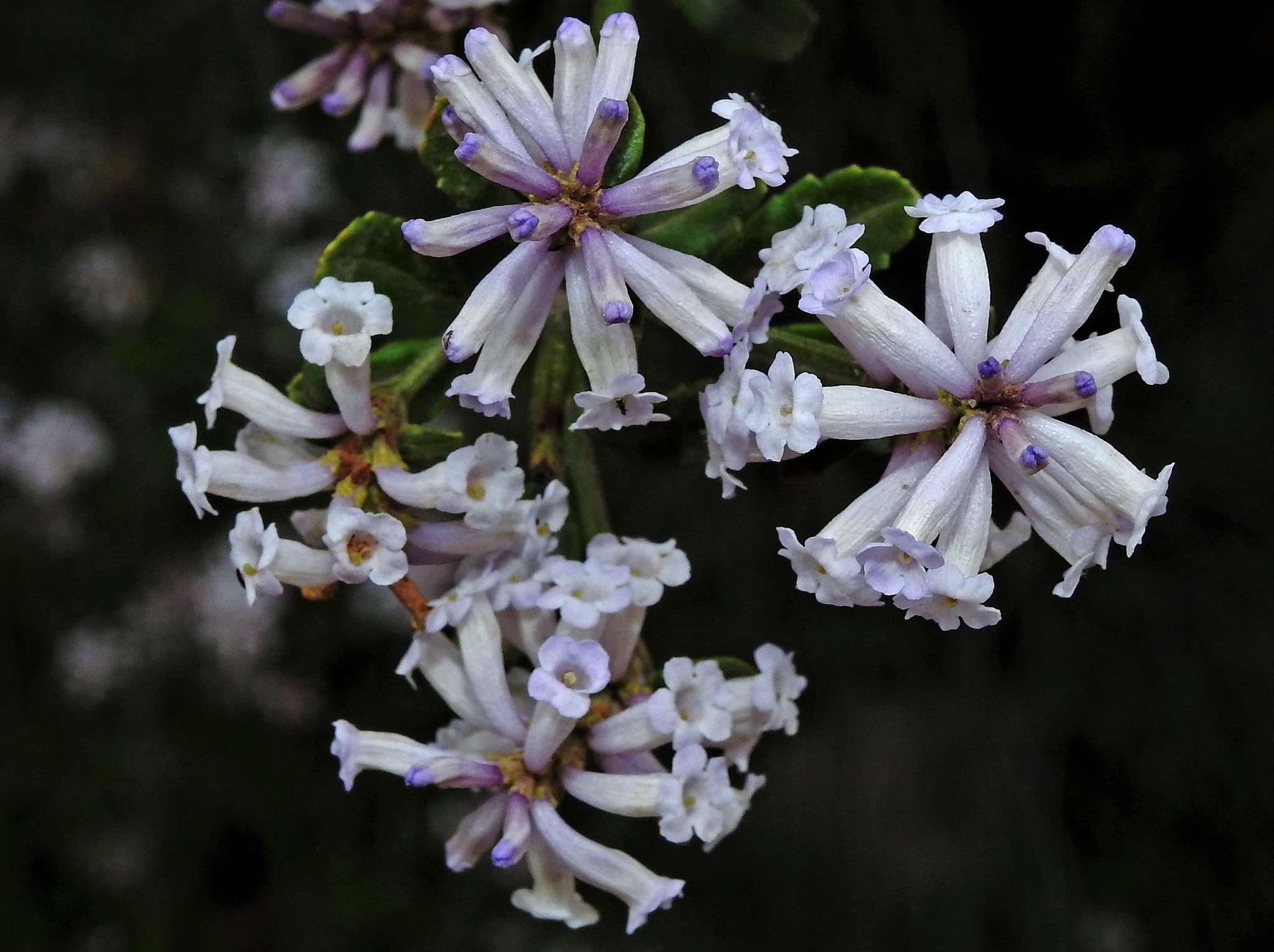

Scientific classification
- Kingdom: Plantae
- Clade: Tracheophytes
- Clade: Angiosperms
- Clade: Eudicots
- Clade: Asterids
- Order: Lamiales
- Family: Verbenaceae
- Genus: Diostea; Miers
- Species: D. juncea

Binomial name
- Diostea juncea (Gillies & Hook.) Miers

Synonyms
- Homotypic Synonyms: Baillonia juncea (Gillies & Hook.) Benth. & Hook.f. ex B.D.Jacks.; Dipyrena juncea (Gillies & Hook.) Ravenna; Lippia juncea (Gillies & Hook.) Schauer; Verbena juncea Gillies & Hook.; Heterotypic Synonyms: Citharexylum germainii Briq.; Diostea chamaedryfolia Hook.f.; Diostea infuscata Miers; Diostea recurvata Ravenna; Diostea valdiviana (Phil.) Miers; Dipyrena dentata Phil.; Dipyrena infuscata (Miers) Ravenna; Dipyrena recurvata (Ravenna) Ravenna; Dipyrena valdiviana Phil.

= Diostea =

Genus of plants

Diostea is a monotypic genus of flowering plants belonging to the family Verbenaceae. The only species in the genus is Diostea juncea. It is native to Argentina, and Chile.
