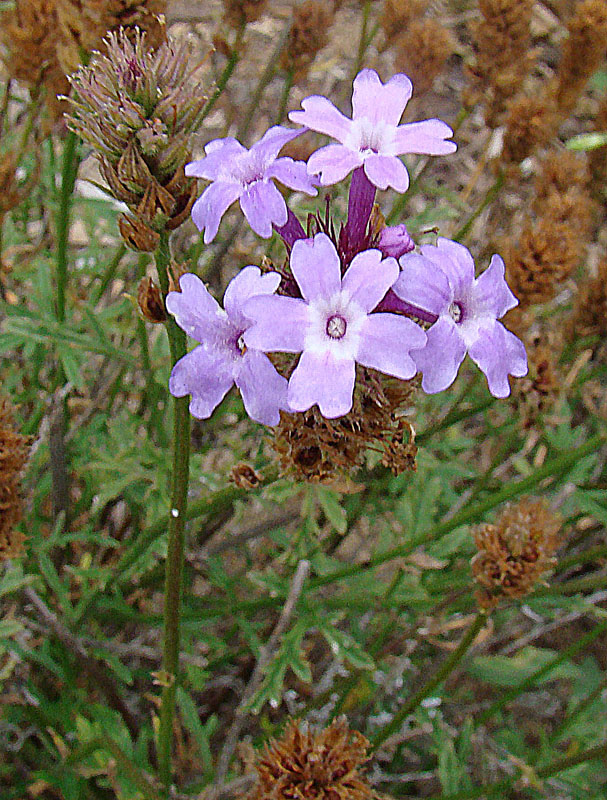

Scientific classification
- Kingdom: Plantae
- Clade: Tracheophytes
- Clade: Angiosperms
- Clade: Eudicots
- Clade: Asterids
- Order: Lamiales
- Family: Verbenaceae
- Genus: Verbena
- Species: V. lilacina

Binomial name
- Verbena lilacina Greene

Synonyms
- Glandularia lilacina (Greene) Umber; Glandularia setacea (L.M.Perry) Umber; Verbena harbisonii Moldenke; Verbena setacea L.M.Perry

= Verbena lilacina =

Species of flowering plant

Verbena lilacina, commonly known as Cedros Island verbena, is a species of flowering plant in the verbena family. It is native to Cedros Island and the adjacent Baja California coast. It is a perennial herb growing to 3 feet tall by 3 feet wide, with erect stems, narrow and elongate bipinnatifid leaves. The plant is available in multiple cultivars for gardens.

== Cultivation ==
Cedros Island verbena is hardy to zone 7 and requires low moisture. It does best in well-draining soil but can tolerate heavier soils.

'De La Mina' variety was selected by Carol Bornstein of the Santa Barbara Botanic Garden. It grows 2–3 feet tall and 3–4 feet wide, has dark purple blossoms with lavender streaks and a light scent.

'Paseo Rancho' variety was introduced by the Rancho Santa Ana Botanic Garden. It grows 3–4 feet tall and 4–5 feet wide, with fragrant light pink flowers streaked with purple.

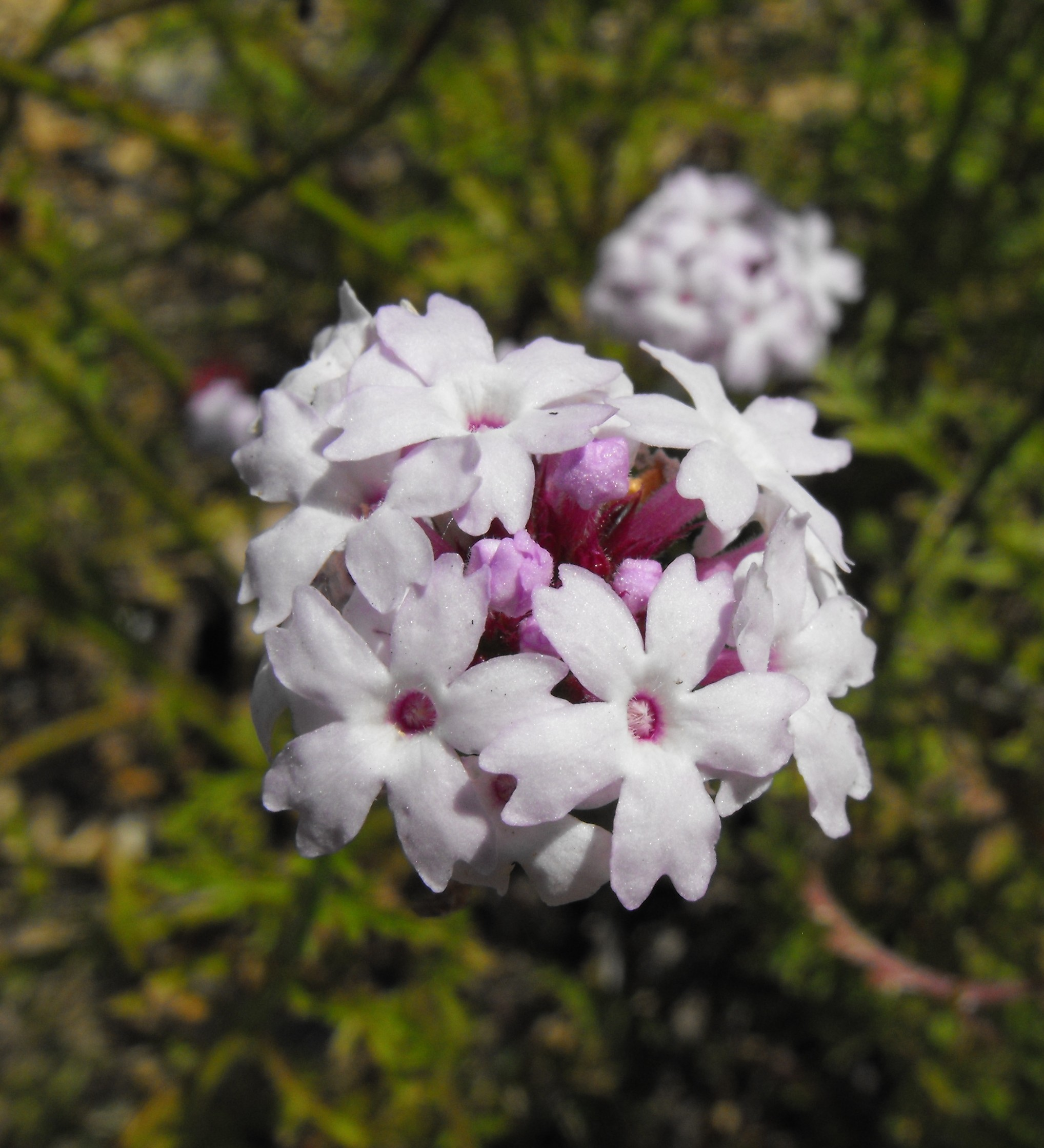
Paseo Rancho blooms
