= Salimenaea =

Scientific classification
- Kingdom: Plantae
- Clade: Tracheophytes
- Clade: Angiosperms
- Clade: Eudicots
- Clade: Asterids
- Order: Lamiales
- Family: Verbenaceae
- Genus: Salimenaea; N.O'Leary & P.Moroni
- Species: S. integrifolia

Binomial name
- Salimenaea integrifolia (Griseb.) N.O'Leary & P.Moroni

Synonyms
- Lippia boliviana Rusby; Lippia boliviana var. angusta Moldenke; Lippia boliviana var. integrifolia Moldenke; Lippia integrifolia (Griseb.) Hieron.; Lippia integrifolia var. beckii Moldenke; Lippia turbinata var. integrifolia Griseb. (1874) (basionym)

Genus of flowering plants

Salimenaea is a genus of flowering plants in the family Verbenaceae. It includes a single species, Salimenaea integrifolia, a shrub native to Bolivia, northern Argentina, and northern Chile, where it grows in deserts and dry shrublands.

The species was first described as Lippia turbinata var. integrifolia by August Grisebach. In 2023 Nataly O'Leary et al. placed in the new monotypic genus Salimenaea as Salimenaea integrifolia.
