= Lampayo =

Scientific classification
- Kingdom: Plantae
- Clade: Tracheophytes
- Clade: Angiosperms
- Clade: Eudicots
- Clade: Asterids
- Order: Lamiales
- Family: Verbenaceae
- Genus: Lampayo; F.Phil. ex Murillo

Genus of plants

Lampayo is a genus of flowering plants belonging to the family Verbenaceae.

Its native range is Bolivia to Northwestern Argentina.

Species:

- Lampayo castellani Moldenke
- Lampayo hieronymi K.Schum. ex Moldenke
- Lampayo officinalis F.Phil. ex Murillo
