= Tamonea =

Scientific classification
- Kingdom: Plantae
- Clade: Tracheophytes
- Clade: Angiosperms
- Clade: Eudicots
- Clade: Asterids
- Order: Lamiales
- Family: Verbenaceae
- Genus: Tamonea; Aubl.

Genus of flowering plants

Tamonea is a genus of flowering plants belonging to the family Verbenaceae.

Its native range is Mexico to Tropical America.

Species:

- Tamonea boxiana (Moldenke) R.A.Howard
- Tamonea curassavica (L.) Pers.
- Tamonea euphrasiifolia B.L.Rob.
- Tamonea juncea Schauer
- Tamonea spicata Aubl.
- Tamonea subbiflora Urb. & Ekman
