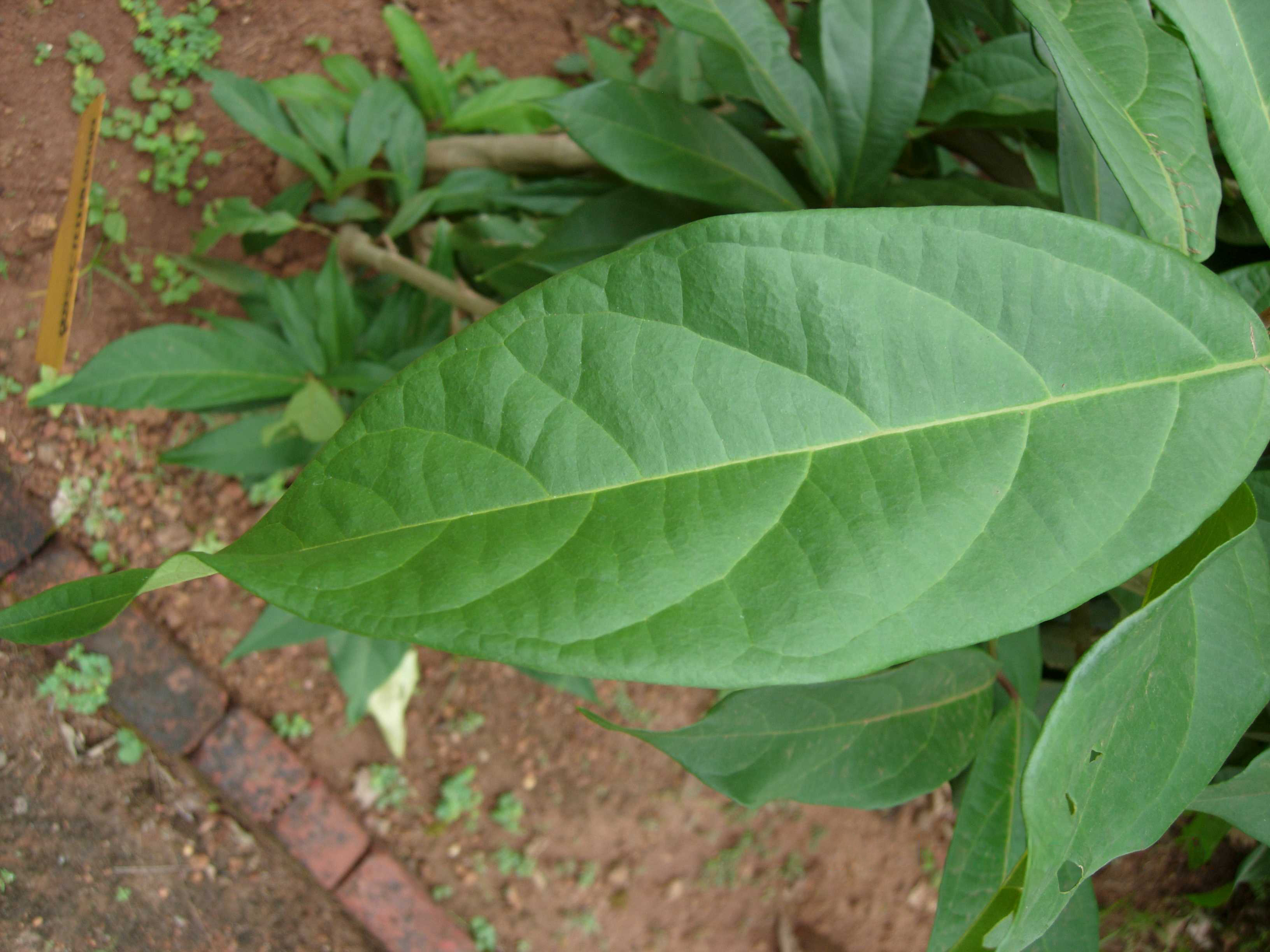

Scientific classification
- Kingdom: Plantae
- Clade: Tracheophytes
- Clade: Angiosperms
- Clade: Eudicots
- Clade: Asterids
- Order: Lamiales
- Family: Lamiaceae
- Genus: Sphenodesme
- Species: S. involucrata

Binomial name
- Sphenodesme involucrata (C.Presl) B.L.Rob., 1916

Synonyms
- Congea ferruginea Wall. [Invalid]; Congea unguiculata Wall. [Invalid]; Sphenodesme involucrata var. involucrata; Sphenodesme odorata H.R.Fletcher; Sphenodesme unguiculata Schauer; Sphenodesme paniculata C.B.Clarke; Symphorema paniculatum B.Heyne ex Wall. [Invalid]; Symphorema unguiculatum (Schauer) Kurz; Vitex involucrata C. Presl; Vitex involucratus C.Presl

= Sphenodesme involucrata =

Species of flowering plant

Sphenodesme involucrata is a species of small liana in the genus Sphenodesme (family Lamiaceae). It is found in: India, Assam, Andaman & Nicobar Islands, Myanmar, Vietnam, Thailand, Malaya, Borneo, Guangdong, Hainan, Taiwan and central Vietnam: where it may be called bội tinh tong bao.

== Gallery ==
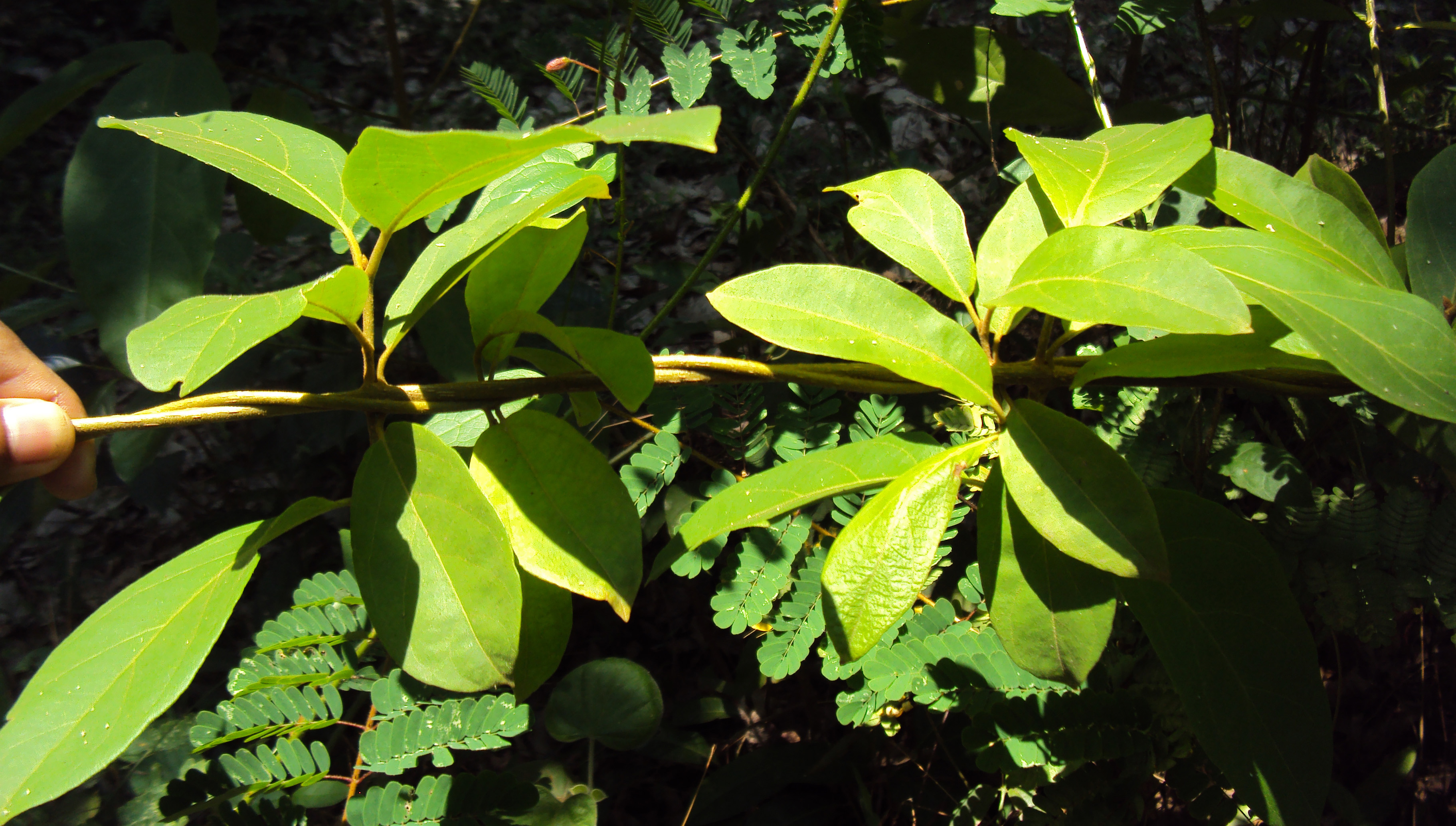

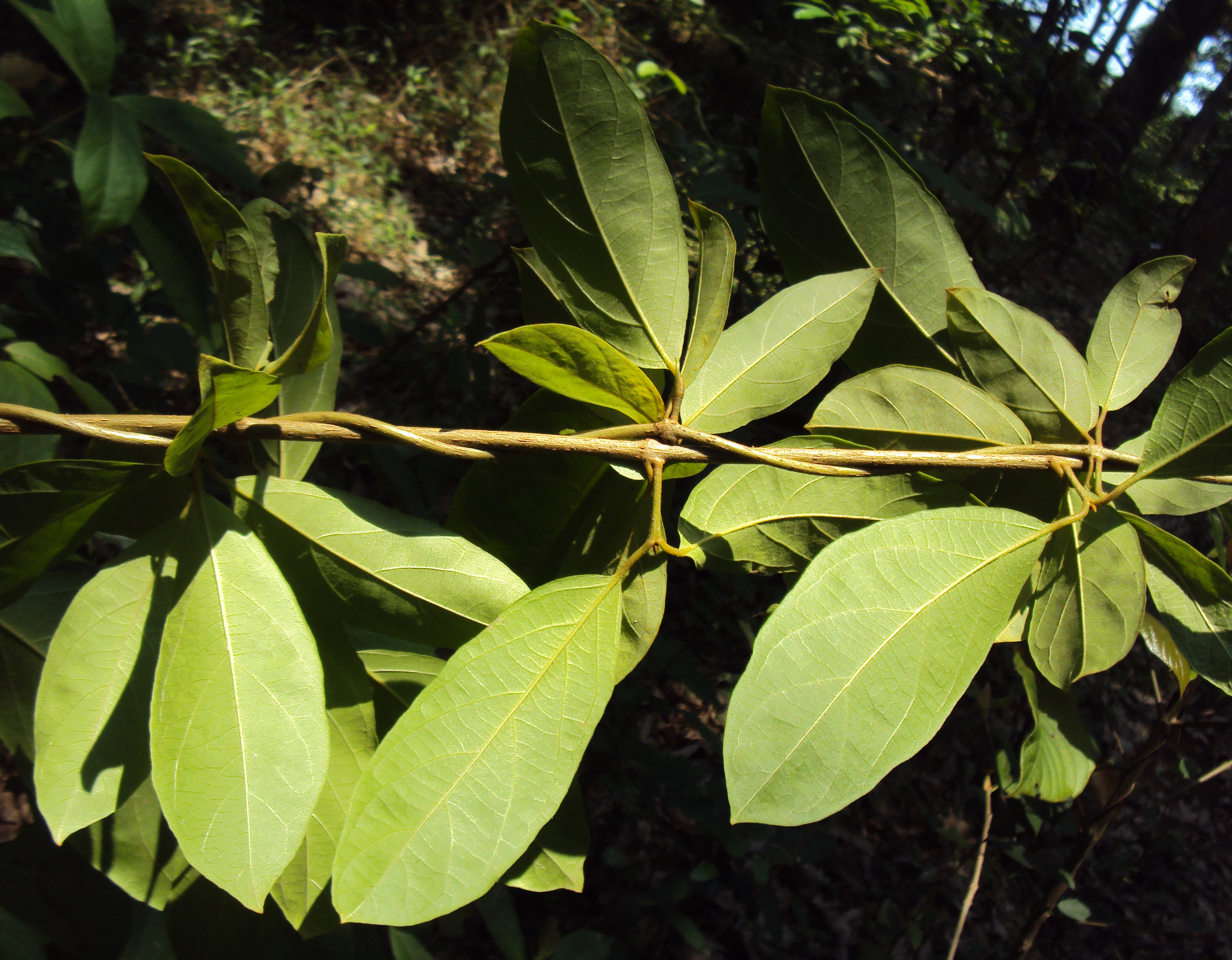

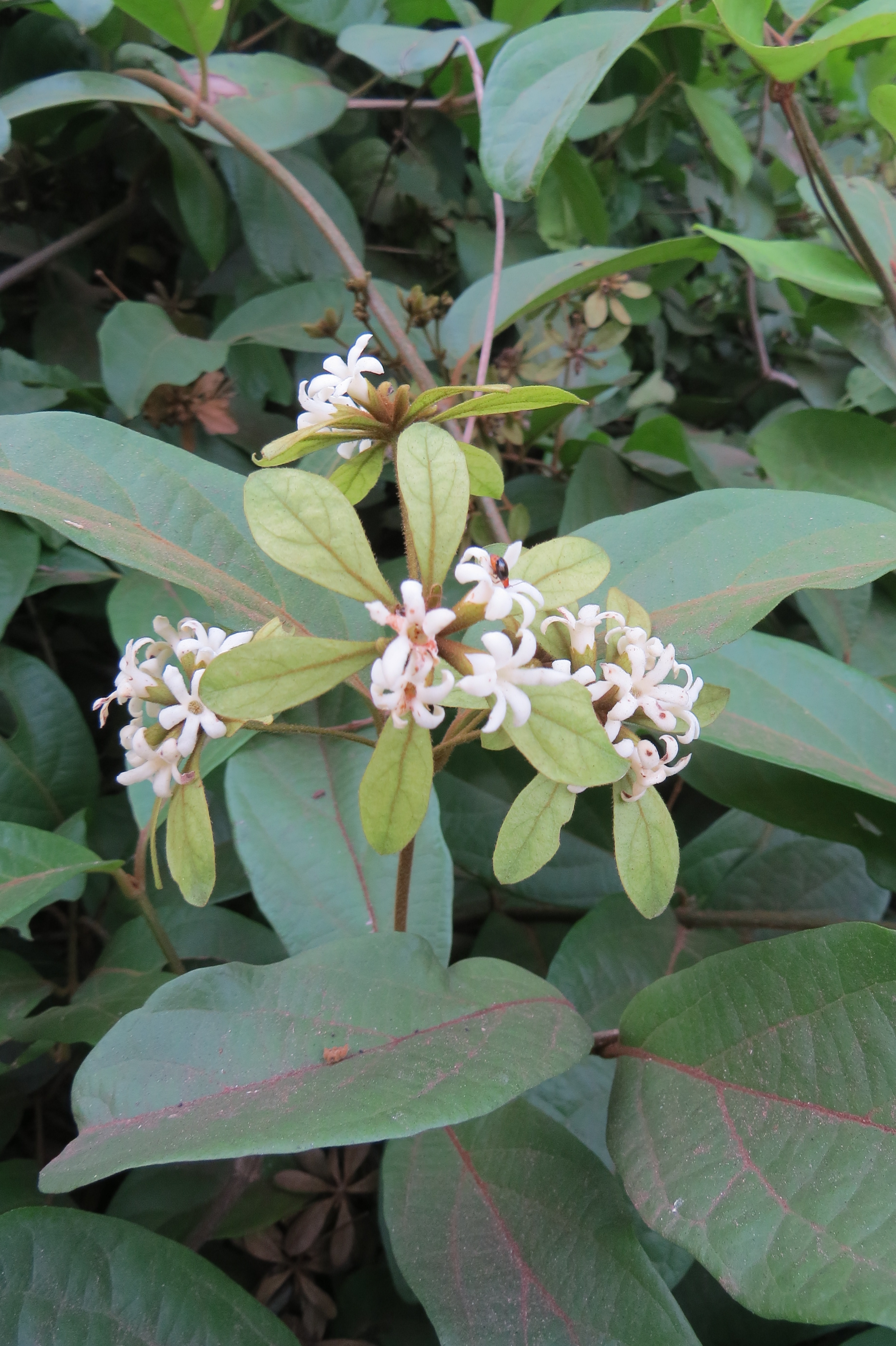
