= Diphyllocalyx =

Scientific classification
- Kingdom: Plantae
- Clade: Tracheophytes
- Clade: Angiosperms
- Clade: Eudicots
- Clade: Asterids
- Order: Lamiales
- Family: Verbenaceae
- Genus: Diphyllocalyx (Griseb.) Greuter & R.Rankin

Genus of plants

Diphyllocalyx is a genus of flowering plants belonging to the family Verbenaceae.

Its native range is Cuba.

Species:

- Diphyllocalyx armatus (Urb.) Greuter & R.Rankin
- Diphyllocalyx cayensis (Britton) Greuter & R.Rankin
- Diphyllocalyx galanus Greuter & R.Rankin
- Diphyllocalyx myrtifolius (Griseb.) Greuter & R.Rankin
- Diphyllocalyx nipensis (Urb.) Greuter & R.Rankin
- Diphyllocalyx urquiolae Greuter & R.Rankin
