= Verbena chiricahensis =

Scientific classification
- Kingdom: Plantae
- Clade: Tracheophytes
- Clade: Angiosperms
- Clade: Eudicots
- Clade: Asterids
- Order: Lamiales
- Family: Verbenaceae
- Genus: Verbena
- Species: V. chiricahensis

Binomial name
- Verbena chiricahensis (Umber) Moldenke

Synonyms
- Glandularia chiricahensis Umber

Species of plant

Verbena chiricahensis, commonly named Chiricahua Mountain mock vervain or Chiricahua vervain, is a species of flowering plant in the family Verbenaceae. The specific name is sometimes misspelled as "chiricahuensis".

== Description ==
Verbena chiricahensis is a perennial herb that grows up to 30 inches tall and produces clusters of pink to purplish pink flowers.

== Distribution and habitat ==
Verbena chiricahensis is native to Arizona, New Mexico, and Mexico. It is found in high mountains and is part of the plant community of the Madrean Sky Islands. It grows on rocky slopes, clearings in mixed woodlands, subalpine meadows, and disturbed areas. Verbena chiricahensis has been observed at a range from 1000 m to 3000 m in elevation.
