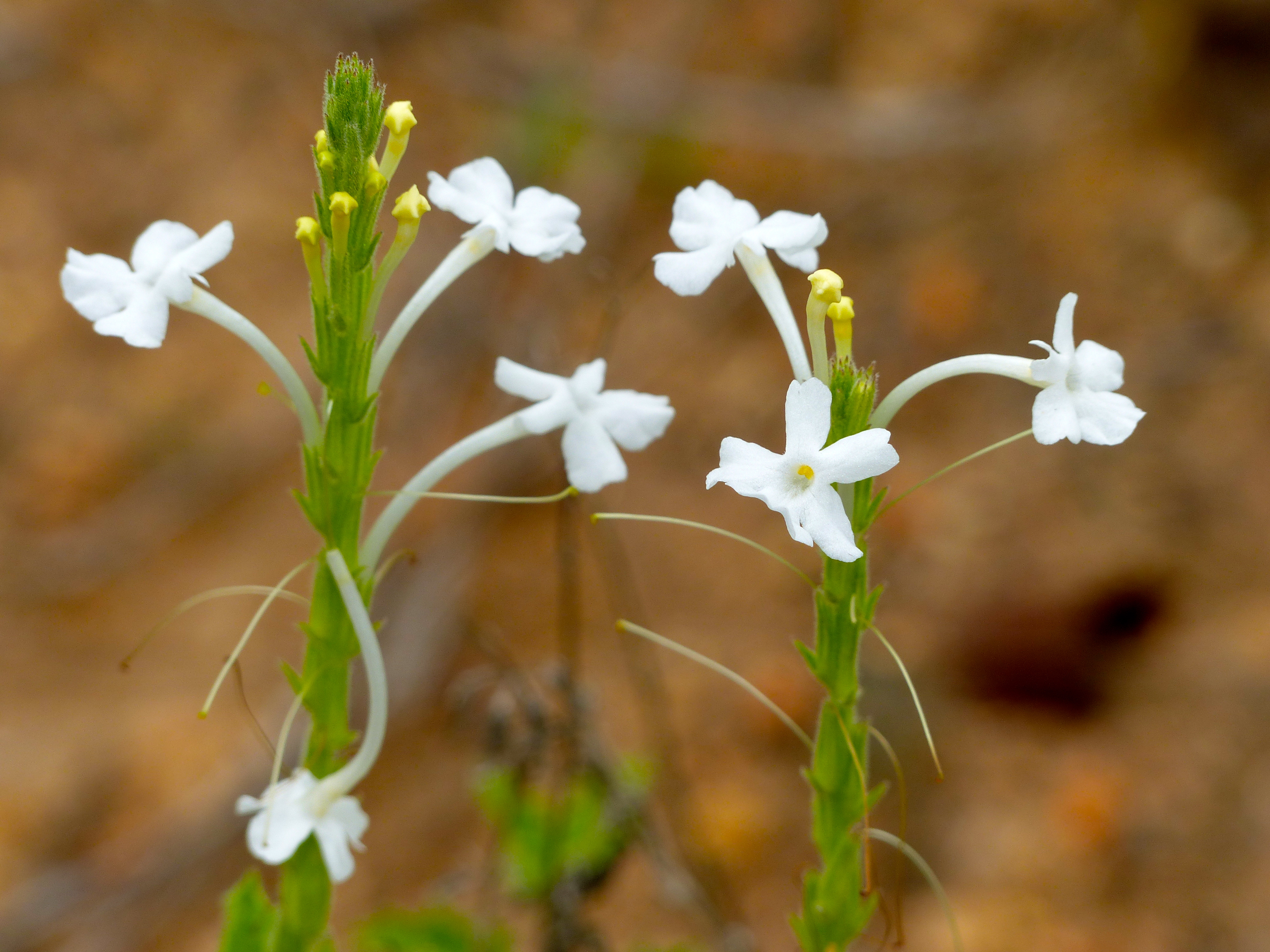
- white trumpets Chascanum hederaceum

Scientific classification
- Kingdom: Plantae
- Clade: Embryophytes
- Clade: Tracheophytes
- Clade: Spermatophytes
- Clade: Angiosperms
- Clade: Eudicots
- Clade: Asterids
- Order: Lamiales
- Family: Verbenaceae
- Genus: Chascanum; E.Mey.

= Chascanum =

Genus of flowering plants

Chascanum is a genus of flowering plants belonging to the family Verbenaceae.

Its native range is Africa to India.

Species:

- Chascanum adenostachyum (Schauer) Moldenke
- Chascanum angolense Moldenke
- Chascanum caespitosum (H.Pearson) Moldenke
- Chascanum cernuum (L.) E.Mey.
- Chascanum cuneifolium (L.f.) E.Mey.
- Chascanum elburense Thulin
- Chascanum garipense E.Mey.
- Chascanum gillettii Moldenke
- Chascanum glandulosum Thulin
- Chascanum hanningtonii (Oliv.) Moldenke
- Chascanum hederaceum (Sond.) Moldenke
- Chascanum hildebrandtii (Vatke) J.B.Gillett
- Chascanum humbertii Moldenke
- Chascanum hyderabadense (Walp.) Moldenke
- Chascanum incisum (H.Pearson) Moldenke
- Chascanum insulare Moldenke
- Chascanum integrifolium (H.Pearson) Moldenke
- Chascanum krookii (Gürke) Moldenke
- Chascanum laetum Fenzl ex Walp.
- Chascanum latifolium (Harv.) Moldenke
- Chascanum marrubiifolium Fenzl ex Walp.
- Chascanum mixtum Thulin
- Chascanum moldenkei (J.B.Gillett) Sebsebe & Verdc.
- Chascanum namaquanum (Bolus ex H.Pearson) Moldenke
- Chascanum obovatum Sebsebe
- Chascanum pinnatifidum (L.f.) E.Mey.
- Chascanum pumilum E.Mey.
- Chascanum rariflorum (A.Terracc.) Moldenke
- Chascanum schlechteri (Gürke) Moldenke
- Chascanum sessilifolium (Vatke) Moldenke
- Chascanum sulcatum Sebsebe
- Chascanum yemenense Sebsebe
