= Dipyrena =

Scientific classification
- Kingdom: Plantae
- Clade: Tracheophytes
- Clade: Angiosperms
- Clade: Eudicots
- Clade: Asterids
- Order: Lamiales
- Family: Verbenaceae
- Genus: Dipyrena; Hook.

Genus of plants

Dipyrena is a genus of flowering plants belonging to the family Verbenaceae.

Its native range is southern South America.

Species:

- Dipyrena glaberrima (Gillies & Hook.) Hook.
- Dipyrena spartioides Ravenna
