= Recordoxylon =

Scientific classification
- Kingdom: Plantae
- Clade: Tracheophytes
- Clade: Angiosperms
- Clade: Eudicots
- Clade: Rosids
- Order: Fabales
- Family: Fabaceae
- Subfamily: Caesalpinioideae
- Tribe: Cassieae
- Genus: Recordoxylon; Ducke (1934)

Species
- Recordoxylon pulcherrimum Barneby; Recordoxylon speciosum (Benoist) Gazel ex Barneby; Recordoxylon stenopetalum Ducke

Genus of plants

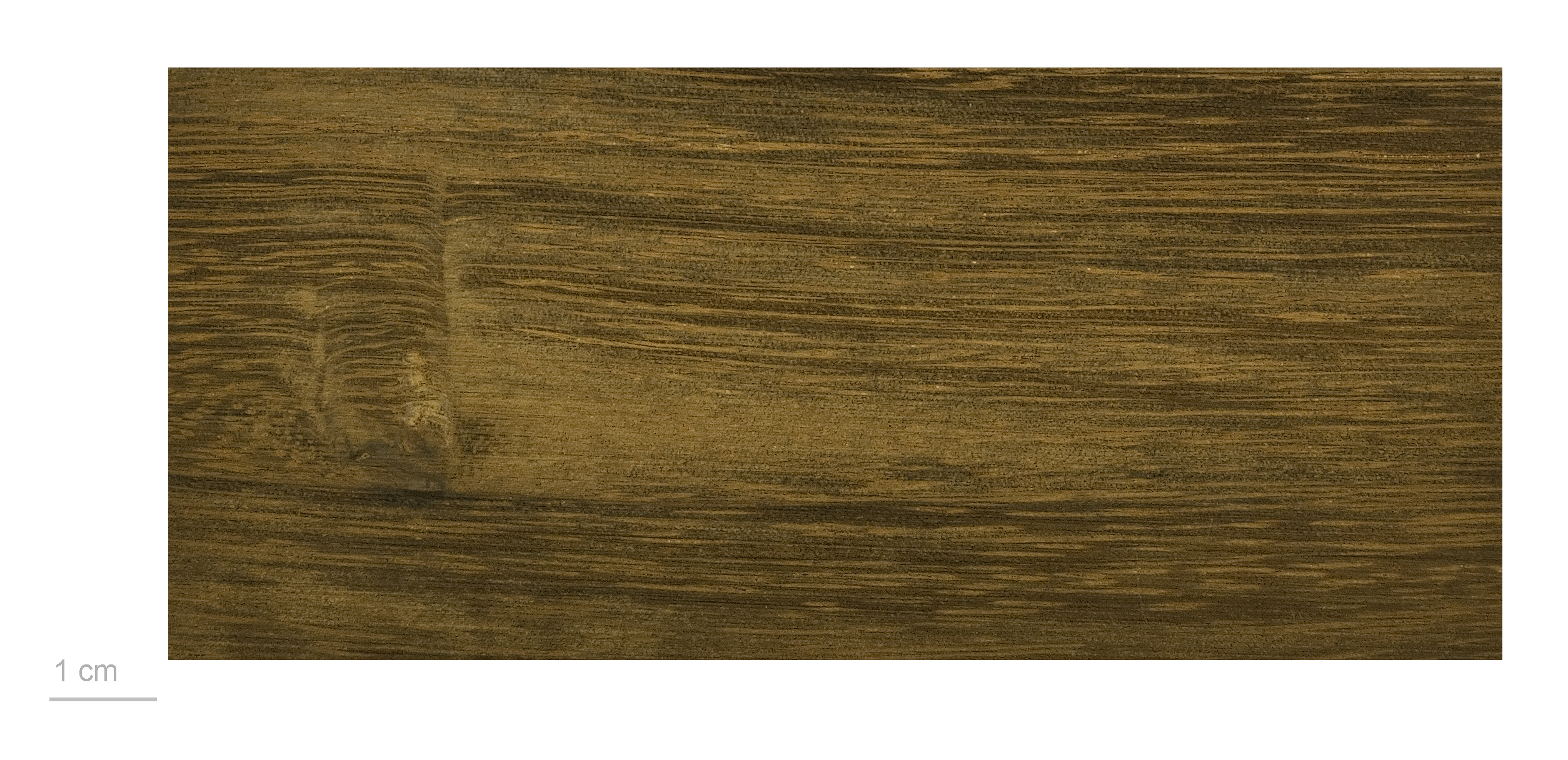
Recordoxylon speciosum - MHNT

Recordoxylon is a genus of flowering plants in the legume family, Fabaceae. It includes three species of trees native to the tropical Amazon rainforest of northern South America, and the species' range includes northern Brazil, Colombia, French Guiana, Guyana, and Venezuela. Habitats include non-flooded rain forest on terra firme, seasonally-flooded riverine forest (várzea), and montane forest.

It belongs to subfamily Caesalpinioideae. It was first described and published in Trop. Woods Vol.39 on page 16 in 1934. The genus name of Recordoxylon is in honour of Samuel J. Record (1881–1945), an American botanist who played a prominent role in the study of trees and wood.

Currently there is no commercial use for it, not as decoration nor for its nutritive properties.
