= Coelocarpum =

Scientific classification
- Kingdom: Plantae
- Clade: Tracheophytes
- Clade: Angiosperms
- Clade: Eudicots
- Clade: Asterids
- Order: Lamiales
- Family: Verbenaceae
- Genus: Coelocarpum; Balf.f.

Genus of flowering plants

Coelocarpum is a genus of flowering plants belonging to the family Verbenaceae.

Its native range is Northeastern Tropical Africa, Western Indian Ocean.

Species:

- Coelocarpum africanum Moldenke
- Coelocarpum glandulosum Moldenke
- Coelocarpum haggierense A.G.Mill.
- Coelocarpum humbertii Moldenke
- Coelocarpum madagascariensis Scott Elliot
- Coelocarpum socotranum Balf.f.
- Coelocarpum swinglei Moldenke
