= Neosparton =

Scientific classification
- Kingdom: Plantae
- Clade: Tracheophytes
- Clade: Angiosperms
- Clade: Eudicots
- Clade: Asterids
- Order: Lamiales
- Family: Verbenaceae
- Genus: Neosparton; Griseb.

Genus of flowering plants

Neosparton is a genus of flowering plants belonging to the family Verbenaceae.

Its native range is southern South America.

Species:

- Neosparton aphyllum (Gillies & Hook.) Kuntze
- Neosparton darwinii Benth. & Hook.f.
- Neosparton ephedroides Griseb.
- Neosparton patagonicum Tronc.
