= Casselia =

Scientific classification
- Kingdom: Plantae
- Clade: Tracheophytes
- Clade: Angiosperms
- Clade: Eudicots
- Clade: Asterids
- Order: Lamiales
- Family: Verbenaceae
- Genus: Casselia; Nees & Mart.

Synonyms
- Timotocia Moldenke

Genus of flowering plants

Casselia is a small genus of flowering plants in the verbena family (Verbenaceae) first named in 1823. Plants in the genus Casselia are native to South America.

== Species ==
As of 2020, Kew's Plants of the World Online accepts seven species in the genus Casselia:

- Casselia chamaedryfolia Cham.
- Casselia confertiflora (Moldenke) Moldenke
- Casselia glaziovii (Briq. & Moldenke) Moldenke
- Casselia integrifolia Nees & Mart.
- Casselia rosularis Sandwith
- Casselia serrata Nees & Mart.
- Casselia zelota (Moldenke) Moldenke
