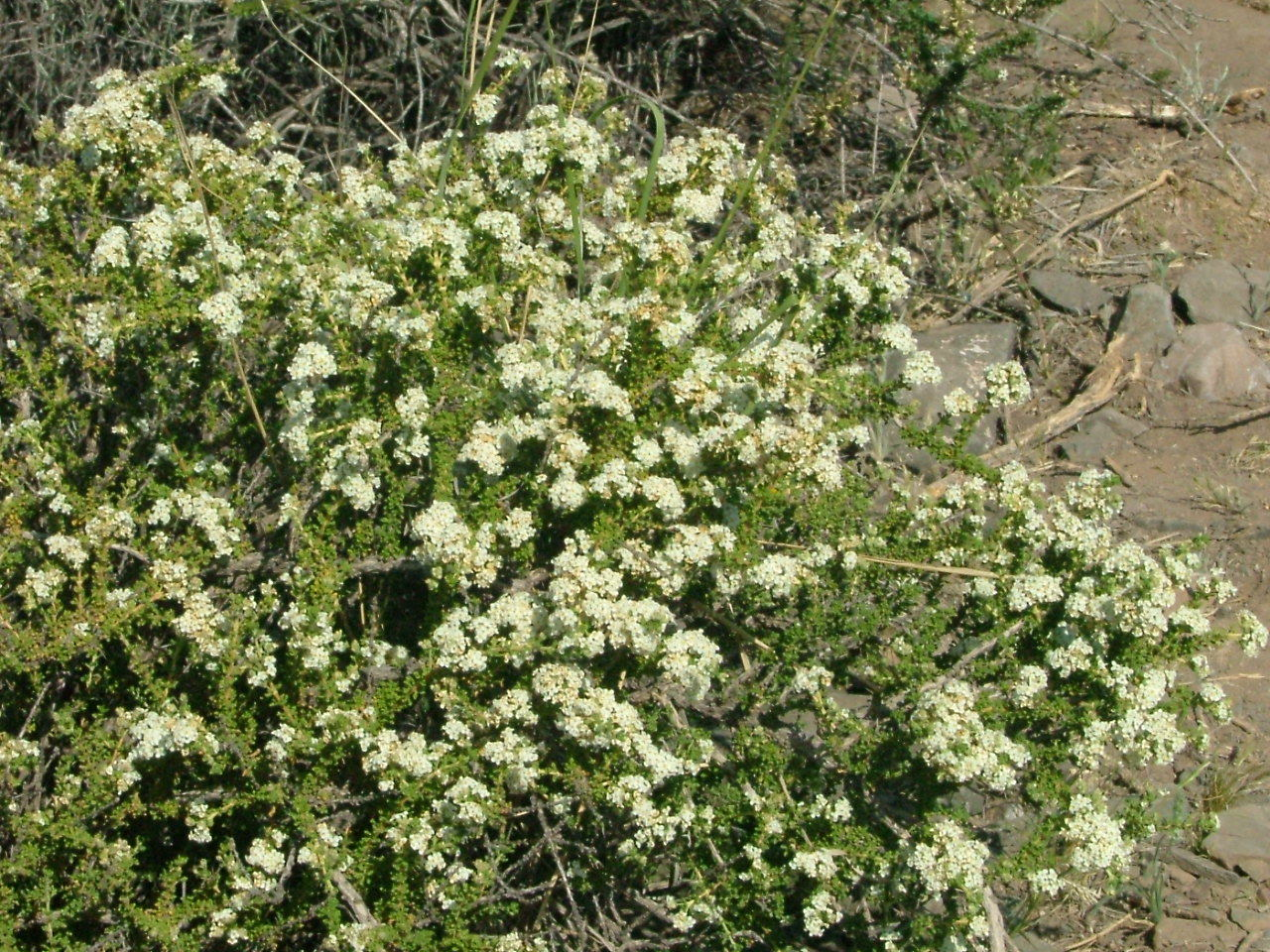

Scientific classification
- Kingdom: Plantae
- Clade: Tracheophytes
- Clade: Angiosperms
- Clade: Eudicots
- Clade: Asterids
- Order: Lamiales
- Family: Verbenaceae
- Genus: Troncosoa; N.O'Leary & P.Moroni
- Species: T. seriphioides

Binomial name
- Troncosoa seriphioides (A.Gray) N.O'Leary & P.Moroni

Synonyms
- (Species): Acantholippia seriphioides (A.Gray) Moldenke

= Troncosoa =

Genus of flowering plants

Troncosoa is a genus of flowering plants in the family Verbenaceae. The genus is monotypic, containing only the species Troncosoa seriphioides, which is found in Argentina.
