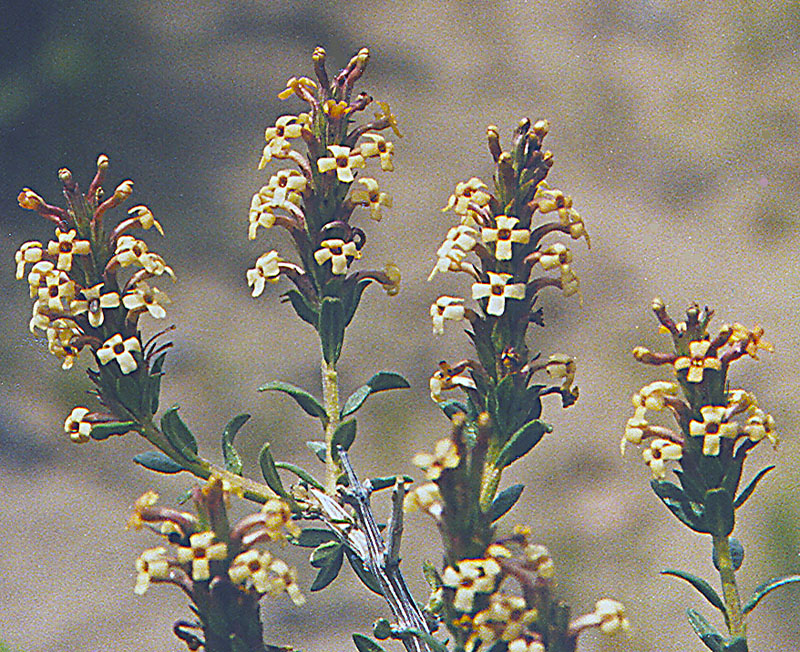
- Mulguraea ligustrina

Scientific classification
- Kingdom: Plantae
- Clade: Tracheophytes
- Clade: Angiosperms
- Clade: Eudicots
- Clade: Asterids
- Order: Lamiales
- Family: Verbenaceae
- Genus: Mulguraea; N.O'Leary & P.Peralta

= Mulguraea =

Genus of flowering plant

Mulguraea is a genus of flowering plants belonging to the family Verbenaceae.

Its native range is Peru to southern South America. It is found in the countries of Argentina, Bolivia, Chile and Peru.

The genus name of Mulguraea is in honour of María E. Múlgura (b. 1943), an Argentinian botanist. She was also a curator and professor at the Instituto de Botánica Darwinion, San Isidro, Buenos Aires, and also specialist in Junellia. It was first described and published in Syst. Bot. Vol.34 on page 782 in 2009.

== Known species ==
According to Kew:

- Mulguraea arequipensis (Botta) N.O'Leary & P.Peralta
- Mulguraea asparagoides (Gillies & Hook.) N.O'Leary & P.Peralta
- Mulguraea aspera (Gillies & Hook.) N.O'Leary & P.Peralta
- Mulguraea cedroides (Sandwith) N.O'Leary & P.Peralta
- Mulguraea cinerascens (Schauer) N.O'Leary & P.Peralta
- Mulguraea echegarayi (Hieron.) N.O'Leary & P.Peralta
- Mulguraea hystrix (Phil.) N.O'Leary & P.Peralta
- Mulguraea ligustrina (Lag.) N.O'Leary & P.Peralta
- Mulguraea scoparia (Gillies & Hook.) N.O'Leary & P.Peralta
- Mulguraea tetragonocalyx (Tronc.) N.O'Leary & P.Peralta
- Mulguraea tridens (Lag.) N.O'Leary & P.Peralta
