= Isidroa =

Scientific classification
- Kingdom: Plantae
- Clade: Tracheophytes
- Clade: Angiosperms
- Clade: Eudicots
- Clade: Asterids
- Order: Lamiales
- Family: Verbenaceae
- Genus: Isidroa; Greuter & R.Rankin
- Species: I. spinifera

Binomial name
- Isidroa spinifera (Urb.) Greuter & R.Rankin

Genus of plants

Isidroa is a monotypic genus of flowering plants belonging to the family Verbenaceae. The only species is Isidroa spinifera.

Its native range is Hispaniola. It is found in Dominican Republic and Haiti.

The genus name of Isidroa is in honour of Isidro E. Méndez (b. 1958), a Cuban botanist and specialist in Verbenaceae, especially Lantana. The Latin specific epithet of spinifera refers to spiny, from 'spina' 'spinose'. Both genus and species were first described and published in Willdenowia Vol.46 on page 16 in 2016.
