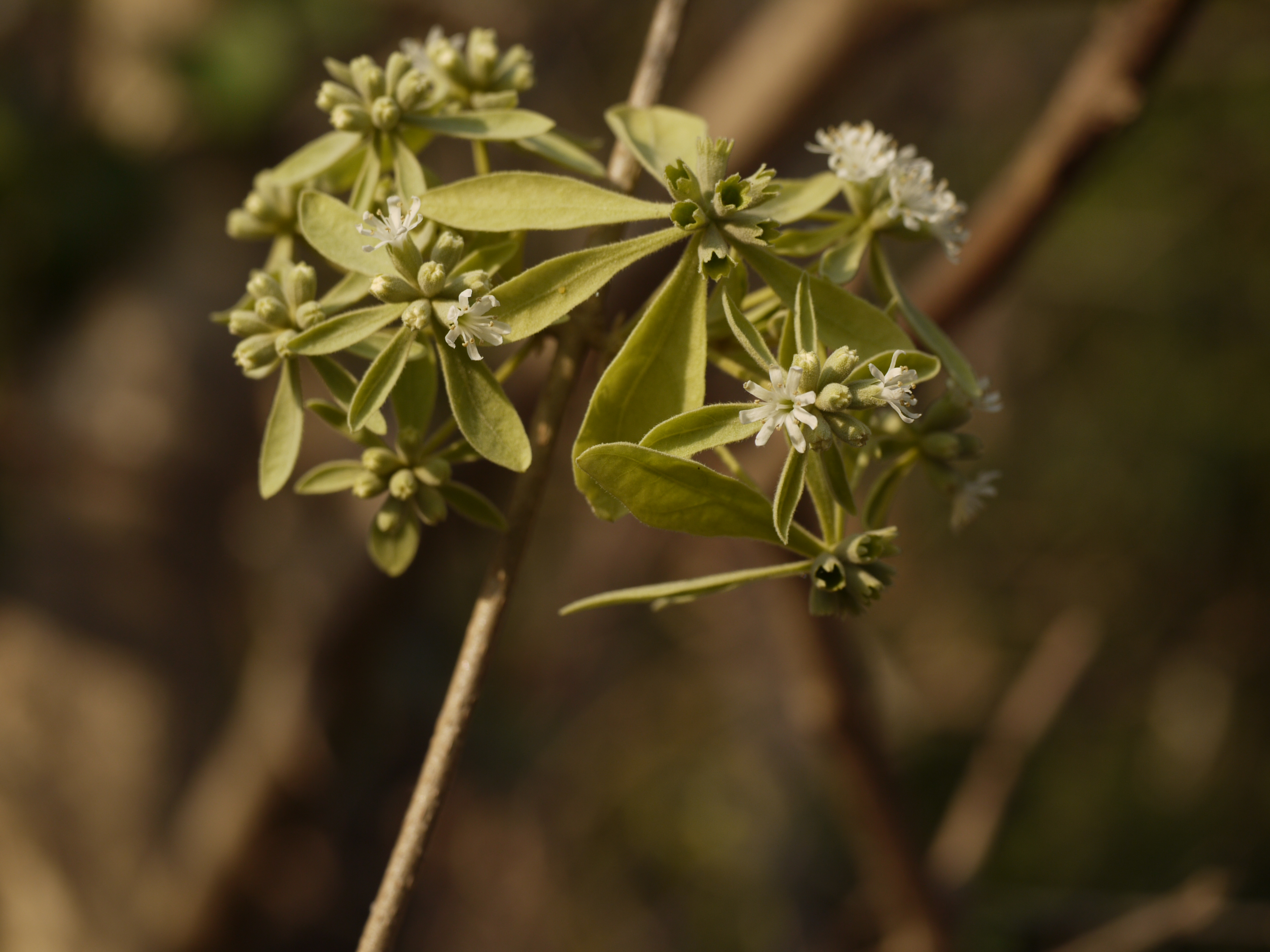
- Symphorema involucratum

Scientific classification
- Kingdom: Plantae
- Clade: Tracheophytes
- Clade: Angiosperms
- Clade: Eudicots
- Clade: Asterids
- Order: Lamiales
- Family: Lamiaceae
- Subfamily: Symphorematoideae
- Genus: Symphorema; Roxb.

Synonyms
- Analectis Juss.; Sczegleewia Turcz. 1863 not Turcz. 1858

= Symphorema =

Genus of flowering plants

Symphorema is a genus of plants in the family Lamiaceae, first described in 1805. It is native to Asia.

Species

- Symphorema involucratum Roxb. - India, Sri Lanka, Andaman Islands, Myanmar, Thailand, Yunnan
- Symphorema luzonicum (Blanco) Fern.-Vill. - Java, Maluku, Philippines
- Symphorema polyandrum Wight - India
