= Pitraea =

Scientific classification
- Kingdom: Plantae
- Clade: Tracheophytes
- Clade: Angiosperms
- Clade: Eudicots
- Clade: Asterids
- Order: Lamiales
- Family: Verbenaceae
- Genus: Pitraea; Turcz.
- Species: P. cuneato-ovata

Binomial name
- Pitraea cuneato-ovata (Cav.) Caro

Synonyms
- Bouchea copiapensis Gay Castelia cuneato-ovata; Cav. Phelloderma cuneato-ovata; (Cav.) Miers Pitraea chilensis; Turcz. Priva cuneato-ovata; (Cav.) Rusby Priva laevis; Juss. Priva orchidioides; Walp. Verbena lobelioides; Graham Verbena orchioides; Walp. Verbena tuberosa; Graham

Species of flowering plant

Pitraea is a monotypic genus of flowering plants belonging to the family Verbenaceae. It only contains one known species, Pitraea cuneato-ovata.

Its native range is southern South America. It is found in (north-eastern and north-western) Argentina, Bolivia, Brazil, (central and northern) Chile and Peru.

The genus name of Pitraea is in honour of Adolf Samoilovich Pitra (1830–1889), a Russian professor of botany in Kharkiv. The genus has 2 known synonyms; Castelia Cav. and Phelloderma Miers. The Latin specific epithet of cuneato-ovata is derived from cuneate meaning wedge-shaped and ovate from ovum meaning. The genus was first described and published in Bull. Soc. Imp. Naturalistes Moscou Vol.35 (II) on page 328 in 1862. Then the species was published in Kurtziana Vol.1 on page 274 in 1961.
