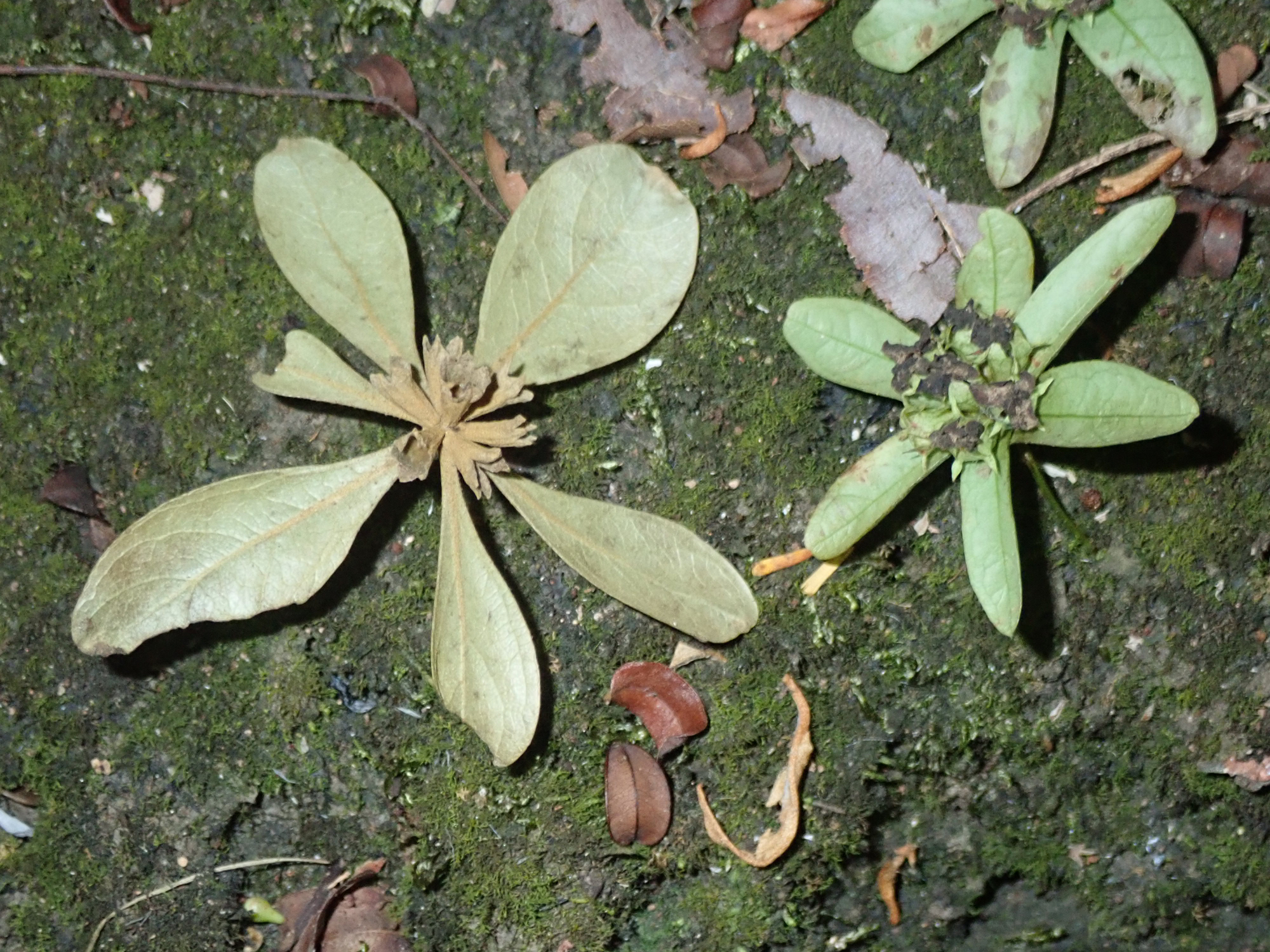
- Fallen Sphenodesme flowers in Cat Tien National Park

Scientific classification
- Kingdom: Plantae
- Clade: Tracheophytes
- Clade: Angiosperms
- Clade: Eudicots
- Clade: Asterids
- Order: Lamiales
- Family: Lamiaceae
- Subfamily: Symphorematoideae
- Genus: Sphenodesme; Jack

Synonyms
- Sphenodesma sensu. Dop; Brachynema F.Muell., rejected name; Decadontia Griff.; Roscoea Roxb. 1832 not Sm. 1806; Viticastrum C.Presl

= Sphenodesme =

Genus of flowering plants

Sphenodesme is a genus of plants in the family Lamiaceae, first described in 1820. The genus is native to southern China, the Indian subcontinent, Indo-China and Malesia.

== Species ==
The following are listed in the Kew World Checklist:

1. Sphenodesme amethystina Dop - Vietnam
2. Sphenodesme eryciboides Kurz - Myanmar, Thailand
3. Sphenodesme ferruginea (Griff.) Briq. - Laos, Vietnam, Myanmar, Thailand
4. Sphenodesme floribunda Chun & F.C.How - Guangdong, Hainan
5. Sphenodesme griffithiana Wight - Vietnam, Myanmar
6. Sphenodesme involucrata (C.Presl) B.L.Rob - India, Assam, Andaman & Nicobar Islands, Myanmar, Vietnam, Thailand, Malaya, Borneo, Guangdong, Hainan, Taiwan
7. Sphenodesme mekongensis Dop - Laos, Thailand
8. Sphenodesme mollis Craib - Yunnan, Cambodia, Thailand, Vietnam
9. Sphenodesme pentandra Jack - Sri Lanka, Bangladesh, Assam, Nicobar Islands, Indochina, Malaya, Borneo, Guangdong, Hainan, Yunnan
10. Sphenodesme pierrei Dop - Vietnam
11. Sphenodesme racemosa (C.Presl) Moldenke - Malaya, Borneo, Sumatra
12. Sphenodesme sarawakensis Moldenke - Borneo
13. Sphenodesme stellata Merr. - Sabah
14. Sphenodesme thorelii Dop - Vietnam
15. Sphenodesme triflora Wight - Thailand, Malaya, Borneo, Sumatra
