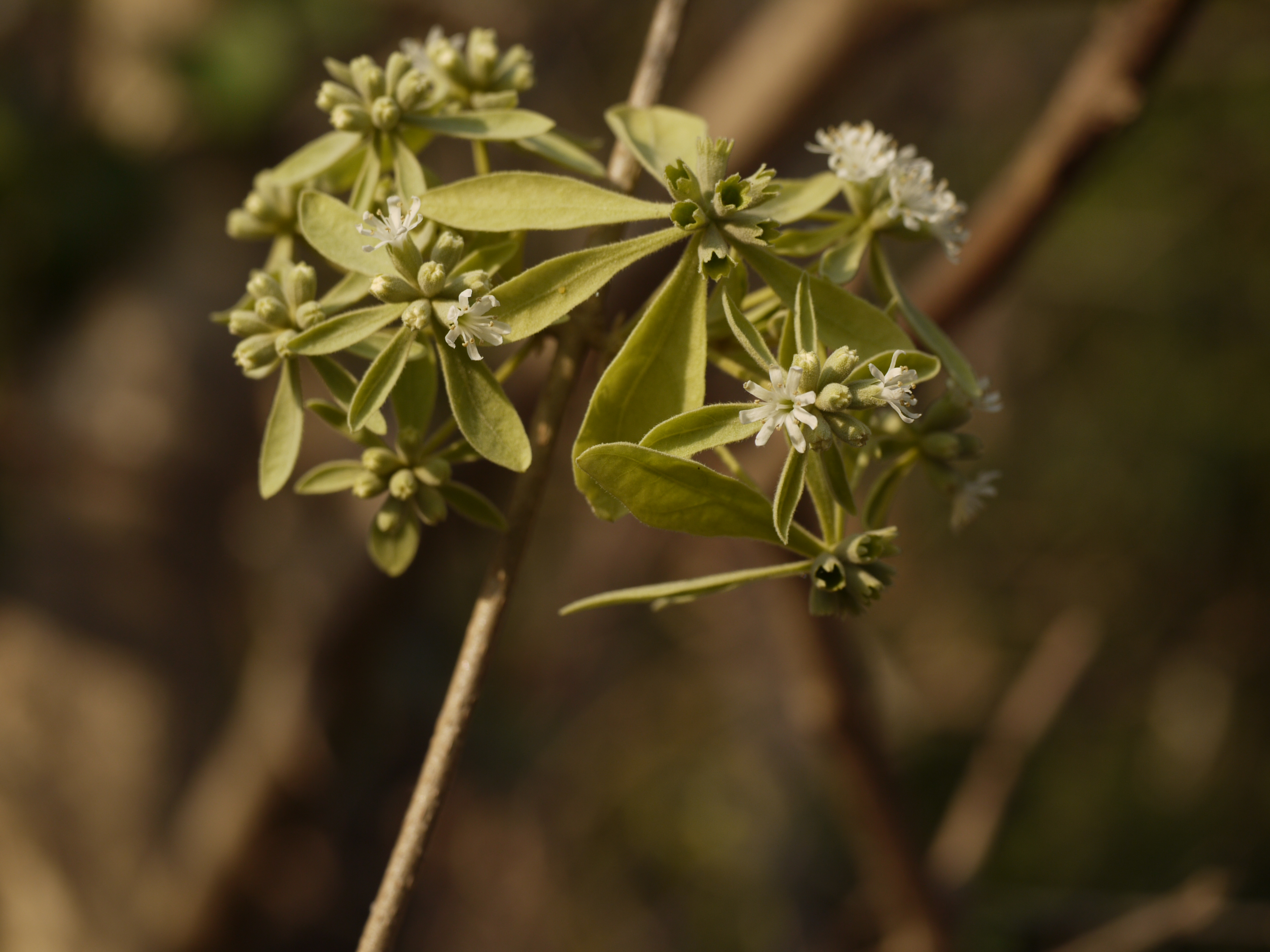
- Symphorema involucratum

Scientific classification
- Kingdom: Plantae
- Clade: Tracheophytes
- Clade: Angiosperms
- Clade: Eudicots
- Clade: Asterids
- Order: Lamiales
- Family: Lamiaceae
- Subfamily: Symphorematoideae; Briq. in Engl. & Prantl, 1895

Genera
- See text

= Symphorematoideae =

Subfamily of flowering plants in the sage family

Sympheromatoideae is a subfamily of flowering plants in the Lamiaceae.

== Genera ==
- Congea
- Sphenodesme
- Symphorema

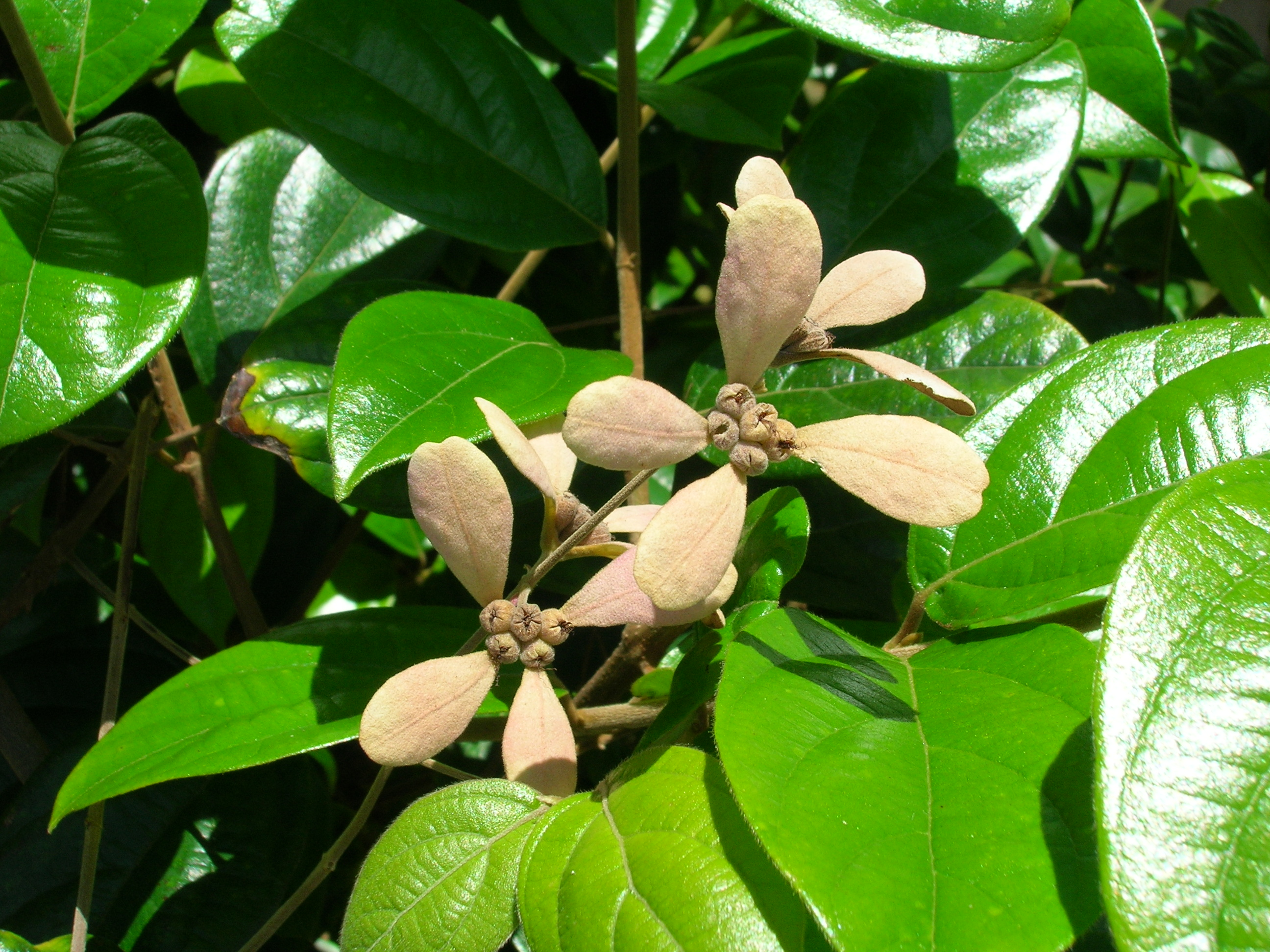
Congea griffithiana

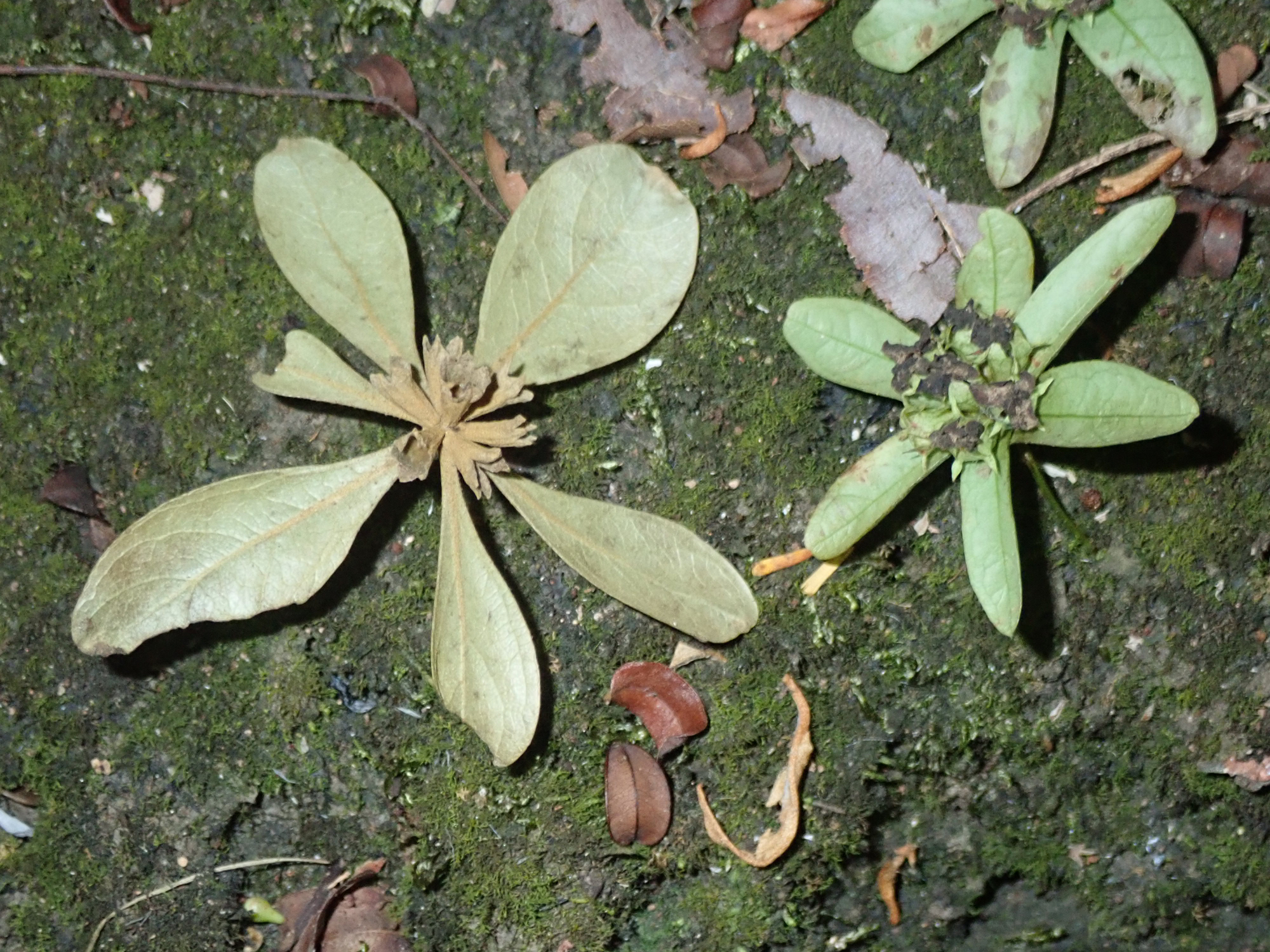
Fallen Sphenodesme flowers
