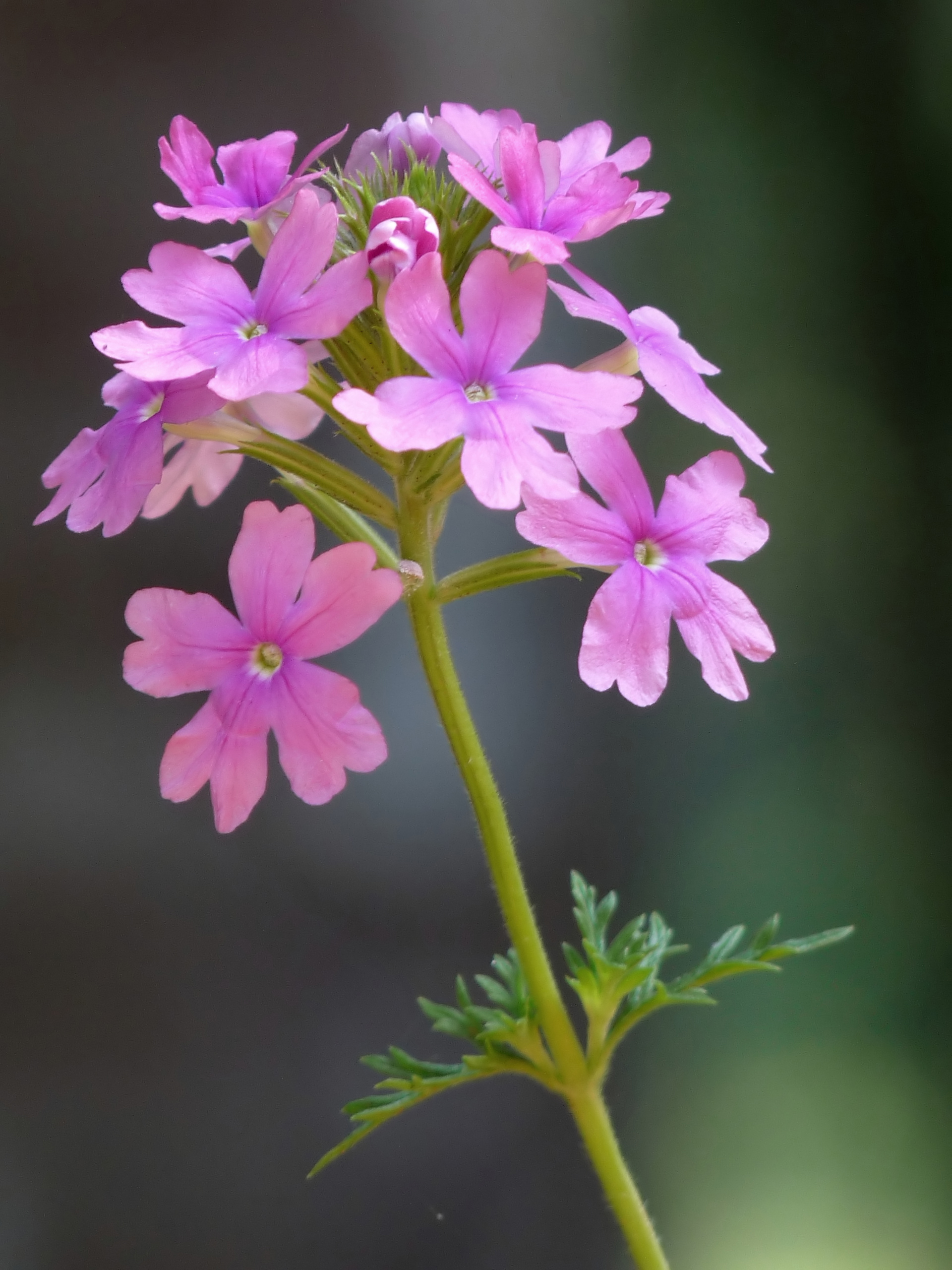

Scientific classification
- Kingdom: Plantae
- Clade: Tracheophytes
- Clade: Angiosperms
- Clade: Eudicots
- Clade: Asterids
- Order: Lamiales
- Family: Verbenaceae
- Genus: Verbena
- Species: V. tenera

Binomial name
- Verbena tenera Spreng.

Synonyms
- List: Glandularia tenera (Spreng.) Cabrera; Shuttleworthia tenera (Spreng.) Walp.; Glandularia pulchella (Sweet) Troncoso; Shuttleworthia pulchella (Sweet) Meisn.; Verbena erinoides var. alba Benary ex Wittm.; Verbena geraniifolia J.Harrison; Verbena mahonetii E.Vilm.; Verbena pulchella Sweet; Verbena santiaguensis f. albiflora Moldenke; Verbena tenera f. albiflora (Kuntze) Moldenke; Verbena tenera var. albiflora Kuntze; Verbena tenuisecta f. alba (Benary ex Wittm.) Moldenke; Verbena tenuisecta var. glabrata Moldenke

= Verbena tenera =

Species of flowering plant

Verbena tenera, commonly known as South American mock vervain, is a species of flowering plant in the verbena family. It is native to Brazil, Argentina, and Uruguay, and it is present elsewhere as an introduced species and roadside weed. It is an annual or perennial herb producing one or more stems growing decumbent to erect in form and hairy to hairless in texture. The rough-haired leaves are divided deeply into lobes. The inflorescence is a dense, headlike spike of many flowers up to 1.5 centimeters wide. Each flower corolla is up to 1.4 centimeters wide and white to purple in color.
