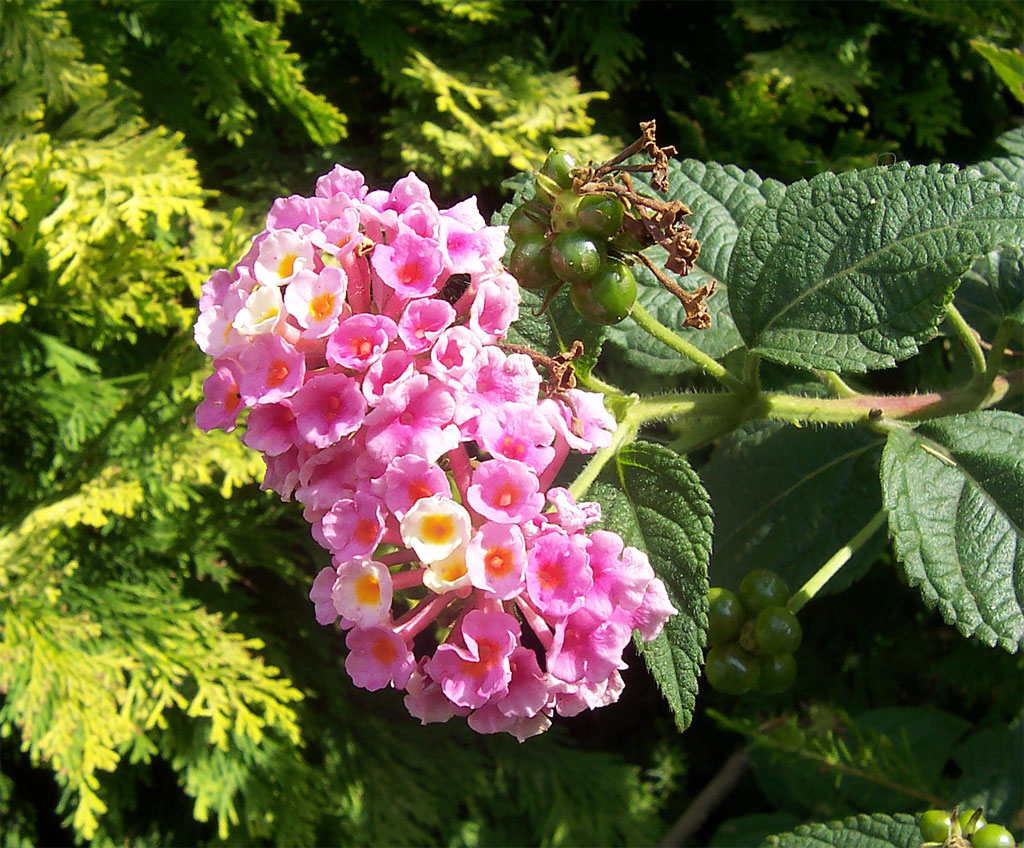
- Flowers, fruit and leaves (on the right) of a Lantana cultivar

Scientific classification
- Kingdom: Plantae
- Clade: Tracheophytes
- Clade: Angiosperms
- Clade: Eudicots
- Clade: Asterids
- Order: Lamiales
- Family: Verbenaceae; J.St.-Hil.

Synonyms
- Durantaceae J.Agardh; Petreaceae J.Agardh

= Verbenaceae =

Family of flowering plants comprising vervains

The Verbenaceae (/ˌvɜːrbəˈneɪsi.iː/ VUR-bə-NAY-see-ee), the verbena family or vervain family, is a family of mainly tropical flowering plants. It contains trees, shrubs, and herbs notable for heads, spikes, or clusters of small flowers, many of which have an aromatic smell.

The family Verbenaceae includes 32 genera and 800 species. Phylogenetic studies have shown that numerous genera traditionally classified in Verbenaceae belong instead in Lamiaceae. The mangrove genus Avicennia, sometimes placed in the Verbenaceae or in its own family, Avicenniaceae, has been placed in the Acanthaceae.

Economically important Verbenaceae include:

- Lemon verbena (Aloysia triphylla), grown for aroma or flavoring
- Verbenas or vervains (Verbena), some used in herbalism, others grown in gardens

== Taxonomy ==
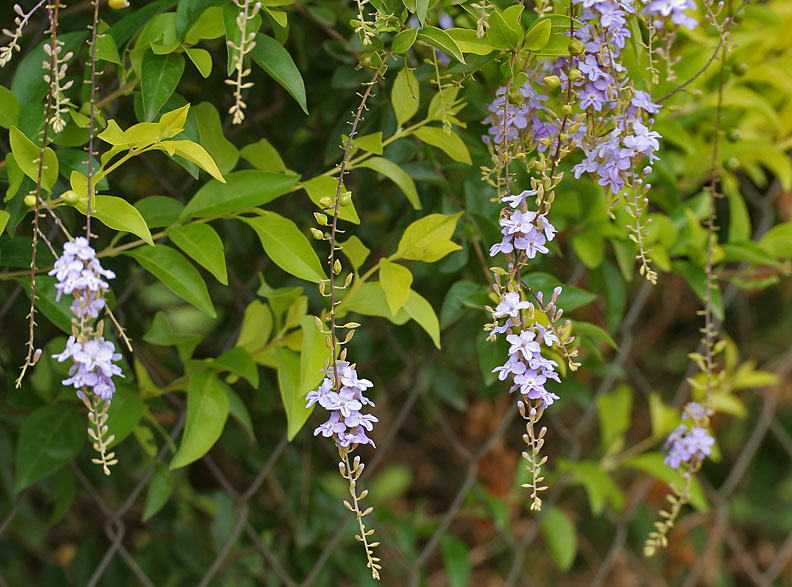
Golden dew drops (Duranta erecta)

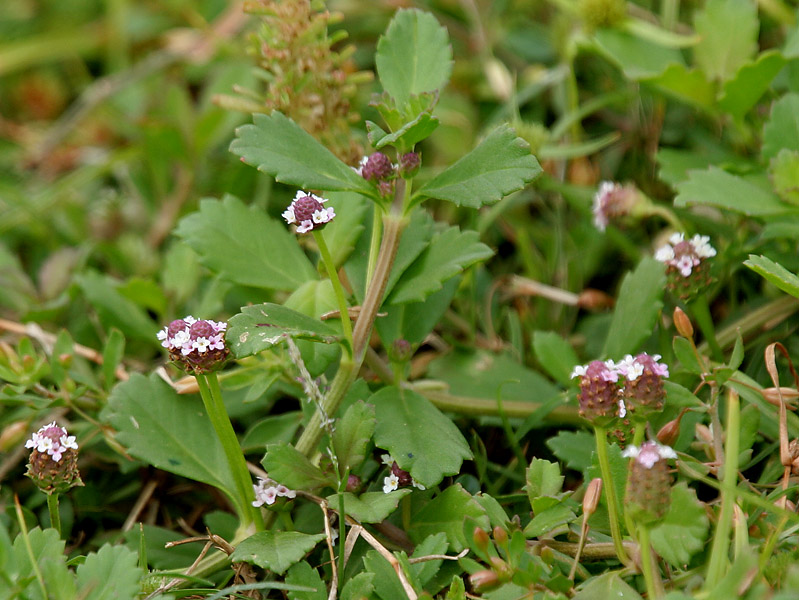
Frog fruit (Phyla nodiflora)

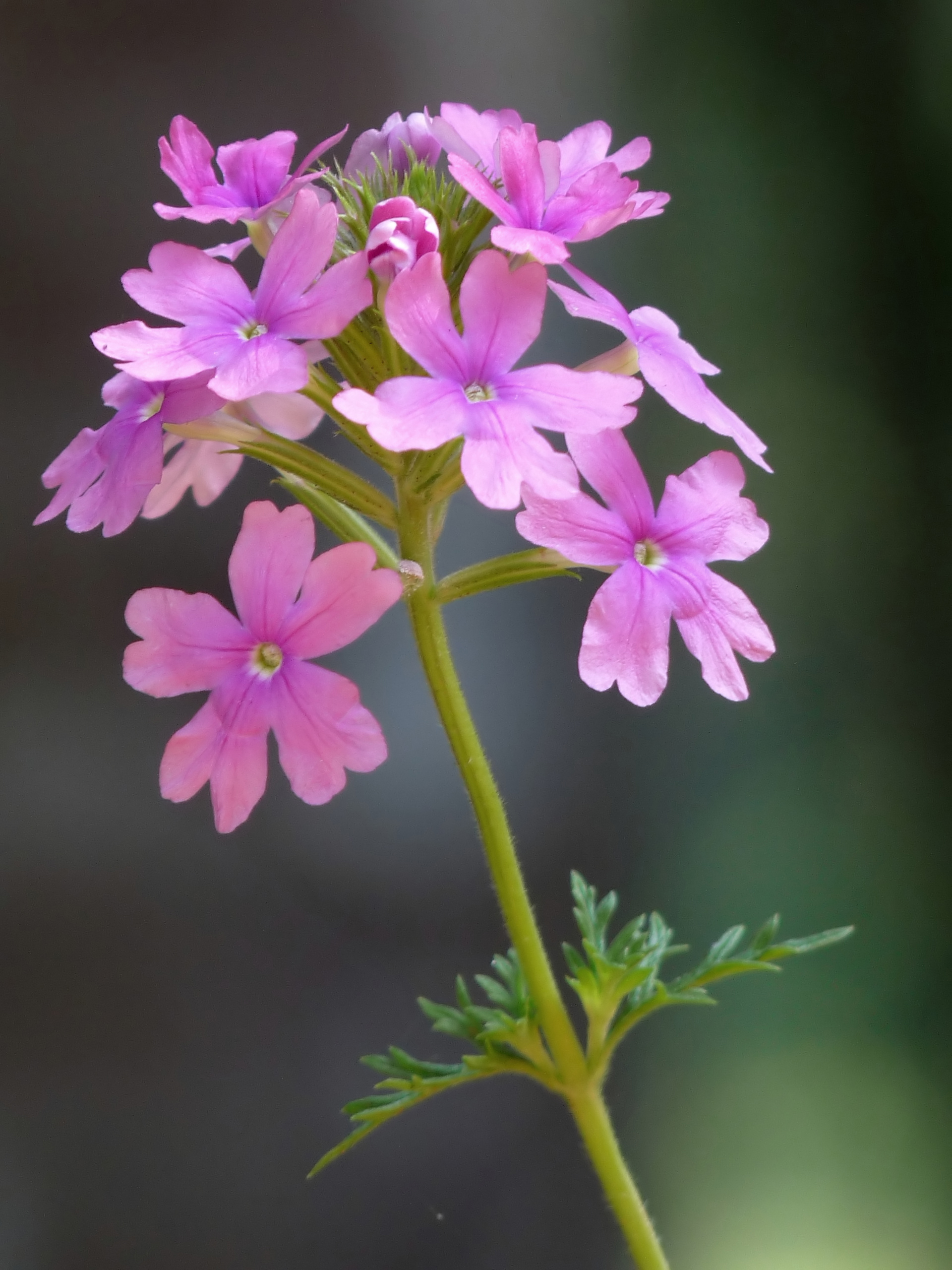
Glandularia pulchella in Kerala

33 genera are accepted. Tribes and genera in the family and their estimated species numbers:

Casselieae (Schauer) Tronc.

- Casselia Nees & Mart. - 6 species
- Parodianthus Tronc. - 2 species
- Tamonea Aubl. - 6 species

Citharexyleae Briq.

- Citharexylum L. (fiddlewoods) - 60 species
- Rehdera Moldenke - 3 species

Duranteae Bent.

- Bouchea Cham. - 13 species
- Chascanum E.Mey - 27 species
- Duranta L. - 31 species
- Recordia Moldenke - 2 species
- Stachytarpheta Vahl - 120 species

Lantaneae Endl.

- Aloysia Palau (beebrushes) - 36 species
- Coelocarpum Balf.f. - 6 species
- Diphyllocalyx (Griseb.) Greuter & R.Rankin - 6 species
- Isidroa Greuter & R.Rankin - 1 species
- Lantana L. (shrub verbenas, lantanas) - 100 species
- Lippia L. (synonym Burroughsia Moldenke) - 140 species
- Nashia Millsp. - 1 species
- Phyla Lour. (frogfruits) - 5 species
- Salimenaea N.O'Leary & P.Moroni – 1 species
- Troncosoa N.O'Leary & P.Moroni - 1 species

Neospartoneae Olmstead & N.O'Leary

- Diostea Miers - 1 species
- Lampayo Phil. ex Murillo - 3 species
- Neosparton Griseb. - 3 species

Petreeae Briq.

- Petrea L. (sandpaper vines) - 12 species

Priveae Briq.

- Pitraea Turcz. - 1 species
- Priva Adans. - 23 species

Verbeneae Dumort.

- Glandularia J.F.Gmel. - 88 species
- Hierobotana Briq. - 1 species
- Junellia Moldenke - 38 species
- Mulguraea N.O'Leary & P.Peralta - 11 species
- Verbena L. (verbenas/vervains) - 57 species

Unassigned

- Dipyrena Hook. - 1 species
- Rhaphithamnus Miers - 2 species

=== Excluded genera ===
Various genera formerly included in the family Verbenaceae are now treated under other families:

Moved to Acanthaceae

- Avicennia L.

Moved to Lamiaceae

- Amasonia L.f.
- Brachysola (F.Muell.) Rye
- Callicarpa L.
- Caryopteris Bunge
- Chloanthes R.Br.
- Clerodendrum L.
- Congea Roxb.
- Cornutia L.
- Cyanostegia Turcz.
- Dicrastylis J.Drumm. ex Harv.
- Discretitheca P.D.Cantino
- Faradaya F.Muell.
- Garrettia H.R.Fletcher
- Glossocarya Wall. ex Griff.
- Gmelina L.
- Hemiphora (F.Muell.) F.Muell.
- Holmskioldia Retz.
- Hosea Ridl.
- Hymenopyramis Wall. ex Griff.
- Kalaharia Baill.
- Karomia Dop
- Lachnostachys Hook.
- Mallophora Endl.
- Monochilus Fisch. & C.A.Mey.
- Newcastelia F.Muell.
- Oncinocalyx F.Muell.
- Oxera Labill.
- Peronema Jack
- Petitia Jacq.
- Petraeovitex Oliv.
- Physopsis Turcz.
- Pityrodia R.Br.
- Premna L.
- Pseudocarpidium Millsp.
- Pseudocaryopteris P.D.Cantino
- Rotheca Raf.
- Schnabelia Hand.-Mazz.
- Spartothamnella Briq.
- Sphenodesme Jack
- Symphorema Roxb.
- Tectona L.f.
- Teijsmanniodendron Koord.
- Teucridium Hook.f.
- Tripora P.D.Cantino
- Vitex L.

Moved to Oleaceae

- Dimetra Kerr
- Nyctanthes L.

Moved to Orobanchaceae

- Asepalum Marais
- Cyclocheilon Oliv.
- Nesogenes A.DC.

Moved to Phrymaceae

- Phryma L.

Moved to Stilbaceae

- Campylostachys Kunth
- Euthystachys A.DC.
- Stilbe P.J.Bergius
- Thesmophora Rourke
