= Jagua tattoo =

Temporary form of skin decoration

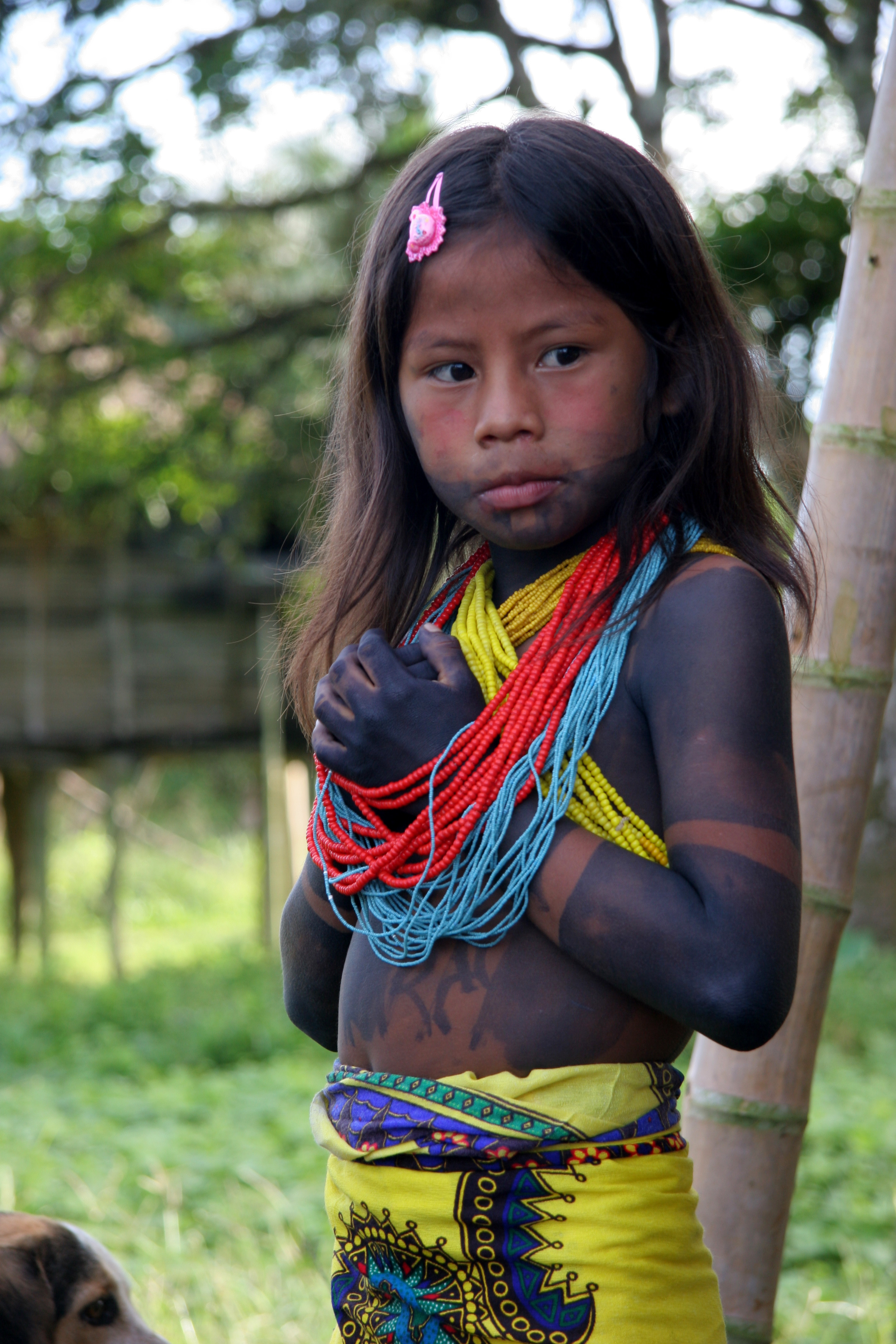
Embera girl with jagua body art in Panama

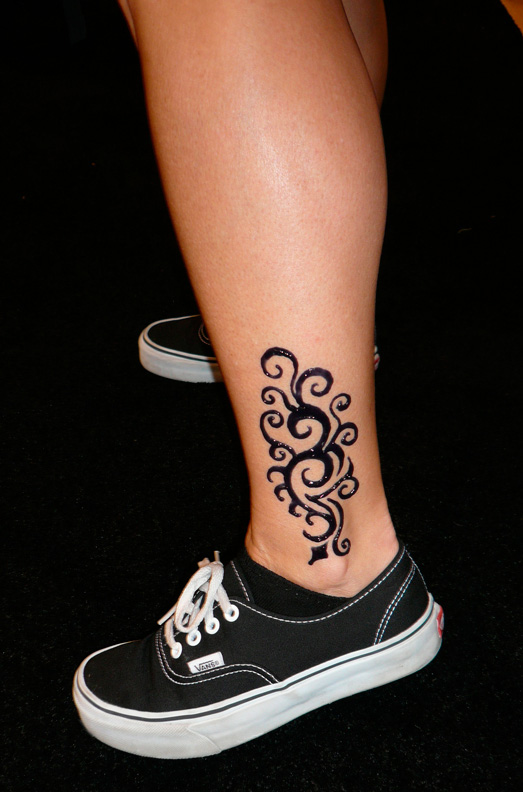
Freshly applied Jagua Tattoo

Jagua tattoo is a temporary form of skin decoration resulting from the application of an extract of the fruit Genipa americana, also known as jagua. This fruit has been used for body ornamentation and medicinal purposes in many areas of South America for centuries. It has recently been introduced in North America and Europe as an addition to henna body art.

The jagua tattoo method involves the surface application of a dye which then sets within a few hours, staining the upper layer of skin, or epidermis. The body sloughs off this layer of skin continuously and eventually, the tattoo fades and disappears.

The term "tattoo" is more commonly associated with the permanent surgical insertion of pigment underneath the skin, as opposed to pigments applied to the skin's surface. Both henna and jagua tattoos stain the top skin layer. In the case of jagua the color develops and darkens over several days until blue-black.

While henna tattoos are associated with South Asian, African, and Middle Eastern cultures, jagua body art was invented by circum-Caribbean tribes and indigenous peoples of the Amazon region.

== The fruit ==
Genipa americana is a species of Genipa, native to northern South America (south to Peru), the Caribbean and southern Mexico, growing in profusion in rainforests. It is commonly called huito; the alternate name jagua may refer to other species of Genipa as well. To the Inca, it was known as hawa or wituq. In the British islands of the West Indies, it was called the marmalade box.

It is a medium size tree growing to 15 m tall. The leaves are opposite, lanceolate to oblong, 20–35 cm long, and 10–19 cm broad, glossy dark green, with an entire margin. The flowers are white, yellow, or red, with a five-lobed corolla 5–6 cm diameter. The fruit is a thick-skinned edible berry 5–8 cm diameter.

== Indigenous uses ==
Native tribes in the Amazon traditionally use the juice of the jagua fruit for body ornamentation. Certain tribes, such as the Matses Indians of Peru also insert it underneath the skin to create permanent markings on the body. Additionally, the fruit is used for a host of purported medicinal purposes. Peoples known to use the jagua fruit (currently or in the past) include: The Zapara, Shuar, Tsachila, Emberá-Wounaan, Yucuna, Guna, Yuqui, Ticuna, Yagua, Arakmbut, Ka'apor, Canelos-Quichua, Amazonian Kichwas and Shipibo-Conibo.

== Western uses ==
"Jagua tattoo" is a term used by people in the body art industry to refer to a form of temporary tattoo, which is created using the juice or extract of the Genipa americana or jagua fruit. Designs created with jagua appear blue/black in color on the skin and resemble a real tattoo (henna tattoos are reddish-brown in color). Depending on a variety of factors, the stain on the skin lasts one to two weeks, fading gradually as the skin exfoliates. Some henna artists use the jagua tattoo preparations as an additional temporary tattoo option, and some professional tattoo artists use it to give their customers the option of 'trying out' a tattoo before using permanent ink.

Several companies selling temporary tattoo kits have introduced products made with jagua as a base.

== Health effects and mechanisms ==
Genipin and geniposide, making up about 1-3% of Genipa americana, are the primary chemicals that are responsible for skin dyeing effects. They are iridoid cross-linking compounds that spontaneously react with amino acids and proteins to form a blue pigment.

Genepin and geniposide are non-toxic compounds. The most common cause of allergic reactions to so-called black henna is the chemical PPD, which is generally not present in Jagua. Cases have been reported of genipin itself causing an allergic reaction that causes acute contact dermatitis.

Commercially available preparations of Jagua are generally not subject to specific legislation and market controls, and may contain other undisclosed ingredients. The plants used to produce these pigments may be grown in contaminated areas and may have additional dyes or chemicals added in the extraction and post-processing stages, which can introduce heavy metals.

== See also ==
- Henna, another form of plant dye skin decoration
- Body painting
