= C17H24O10 =

The molecular formula C_{17}H_{24}O_{10} (molar mass: 388.37 g/mol, exact mass: 388.1369 u) may refer to:

- Secologanin
- Verbenalin
- Geniposide
