= Slender vervain =

Slender vervain is a common name for several plants and may refer to:

- Verbena halei, native to North America
- Verbena rigida, native to South America and known as slender vervain in the British Isles
