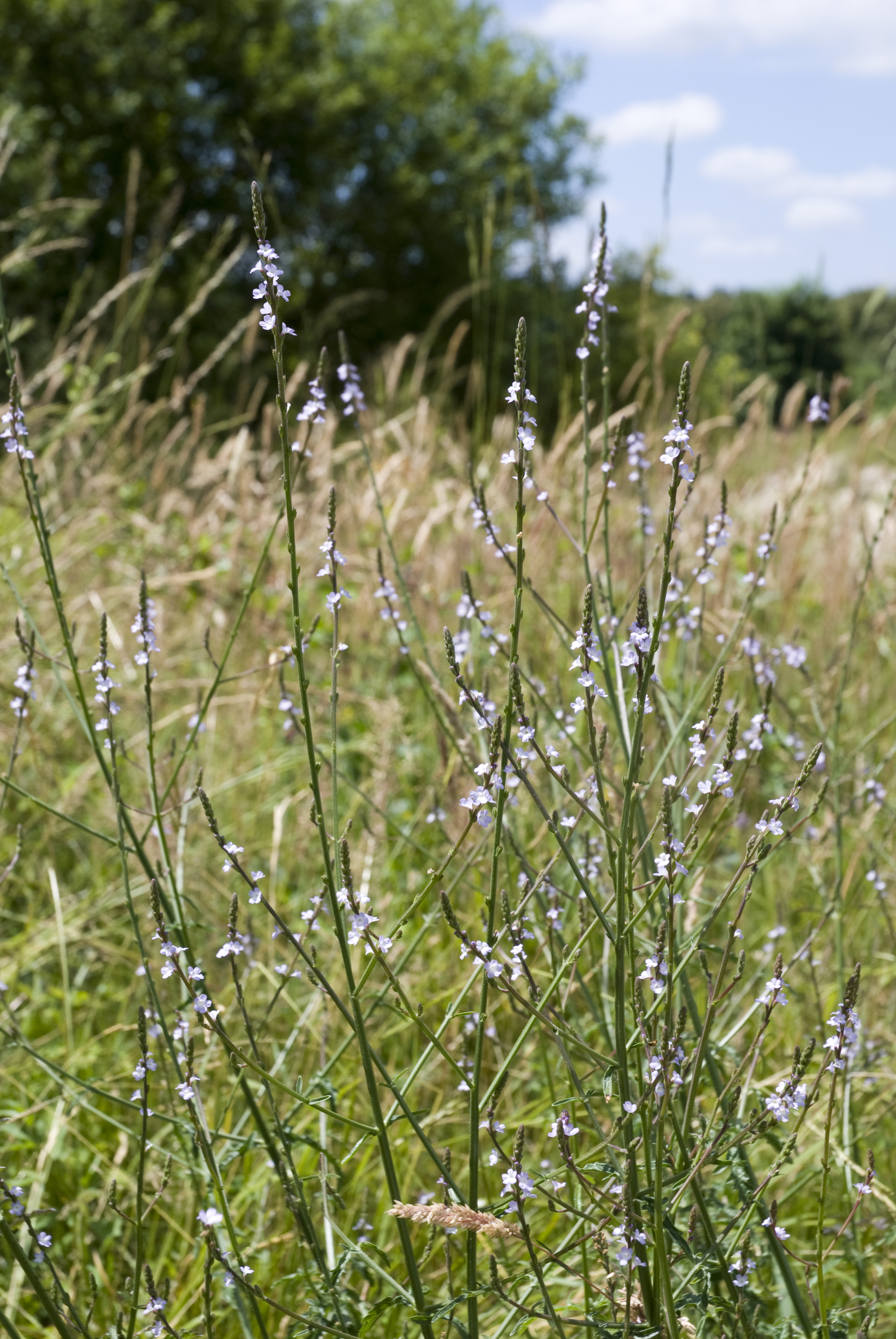
- Flowering

Scientific classification
- Kingdom: Plantae
- Clade: Tracheophytes
- Clade: Angiosperms
- Clade: Eudicots
- Clade: Asterids
- Order: Lamiales
- Family: Verbenaceae
- Genus: Verbena
- Species: V. officinalis

Binomial name
- Verbena officinalis L.

Synonyms
- Verbena domingensis Urb.; Verbena macrostachya F.Muell.

= Verbena officinalis =

Species of flowering plant

Verbena officinalis, the common vervain or common verbena, is a perennial herb native to Europe.

== Description ==
It grows up to 70 centimetres (28 in) high, with an upright habitus. The lobed leaves are toothed, and the delicate spikes hold clusters of two-lipped mauve flowers.

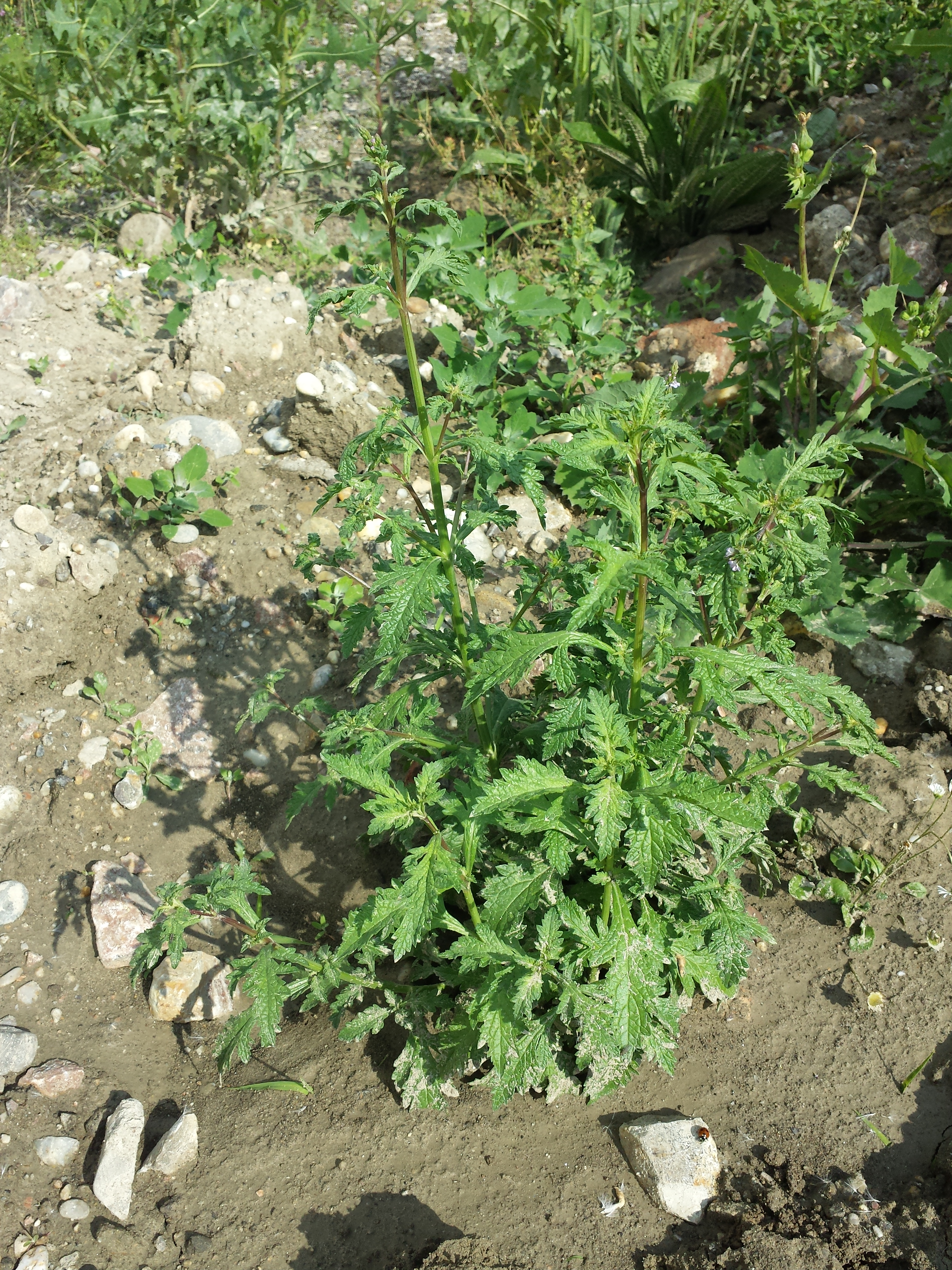
Foliage

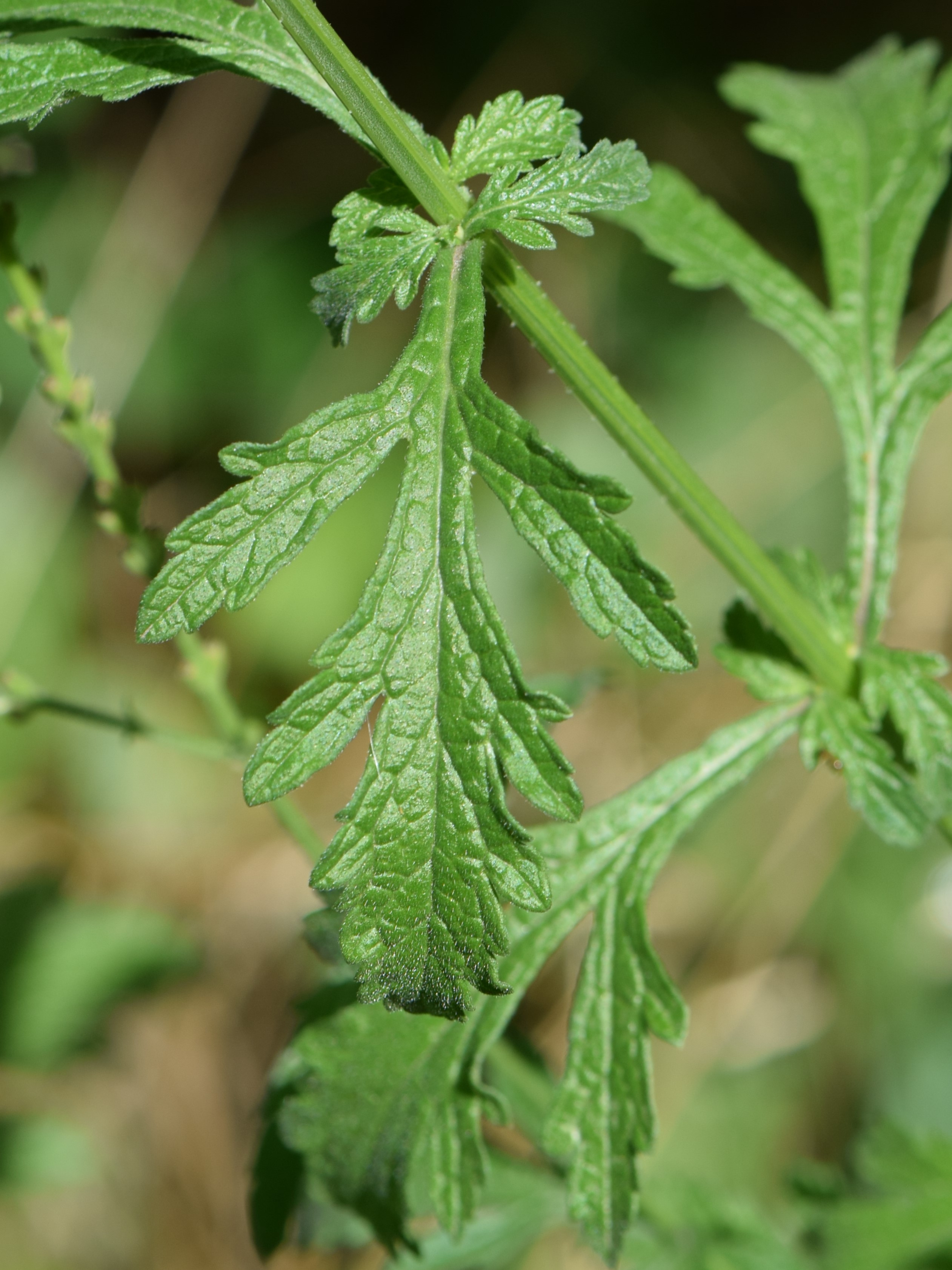
Leaves

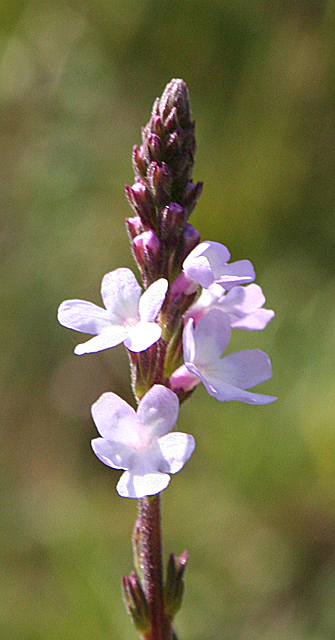
Flower spike

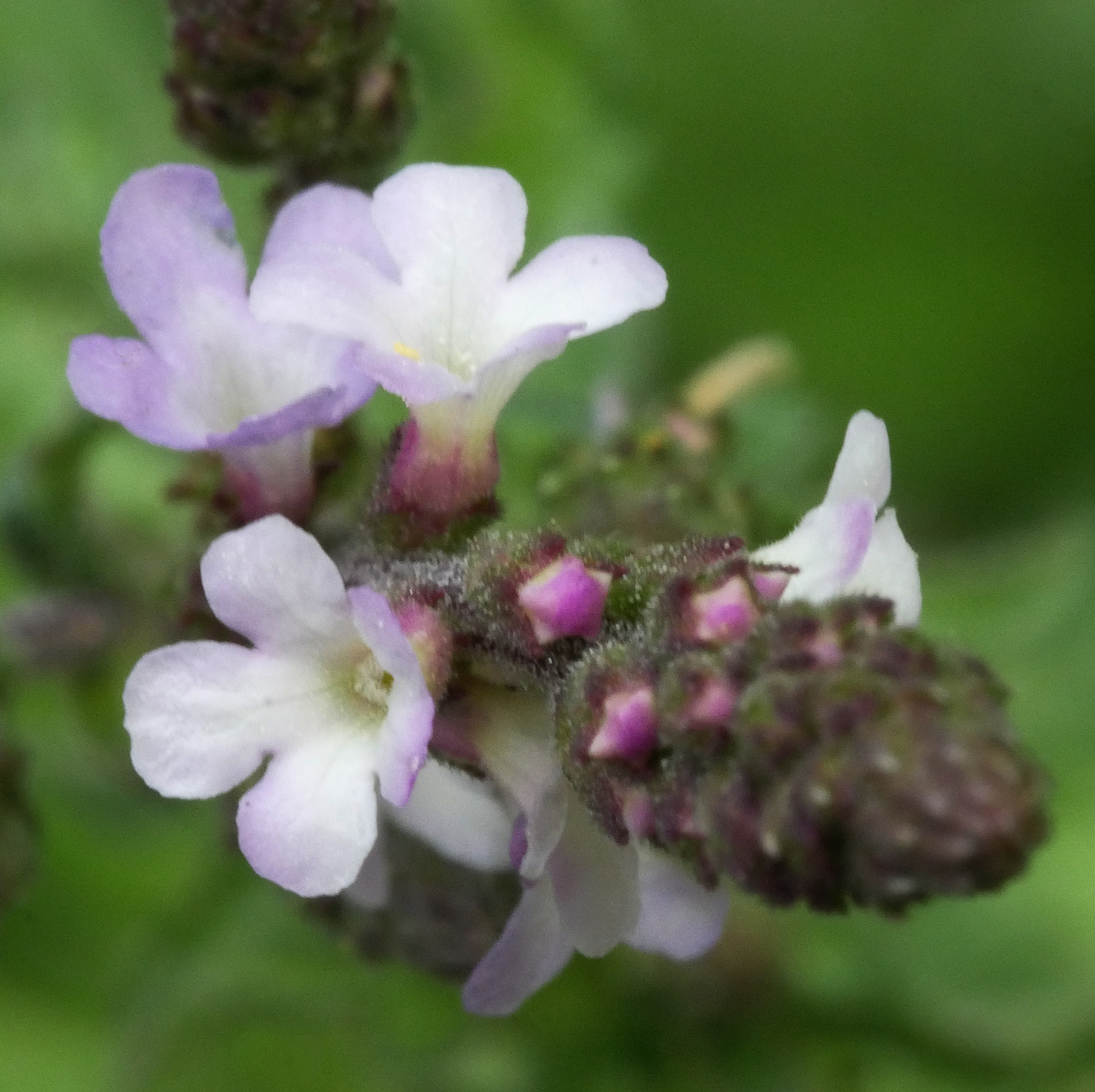
Inflorescence

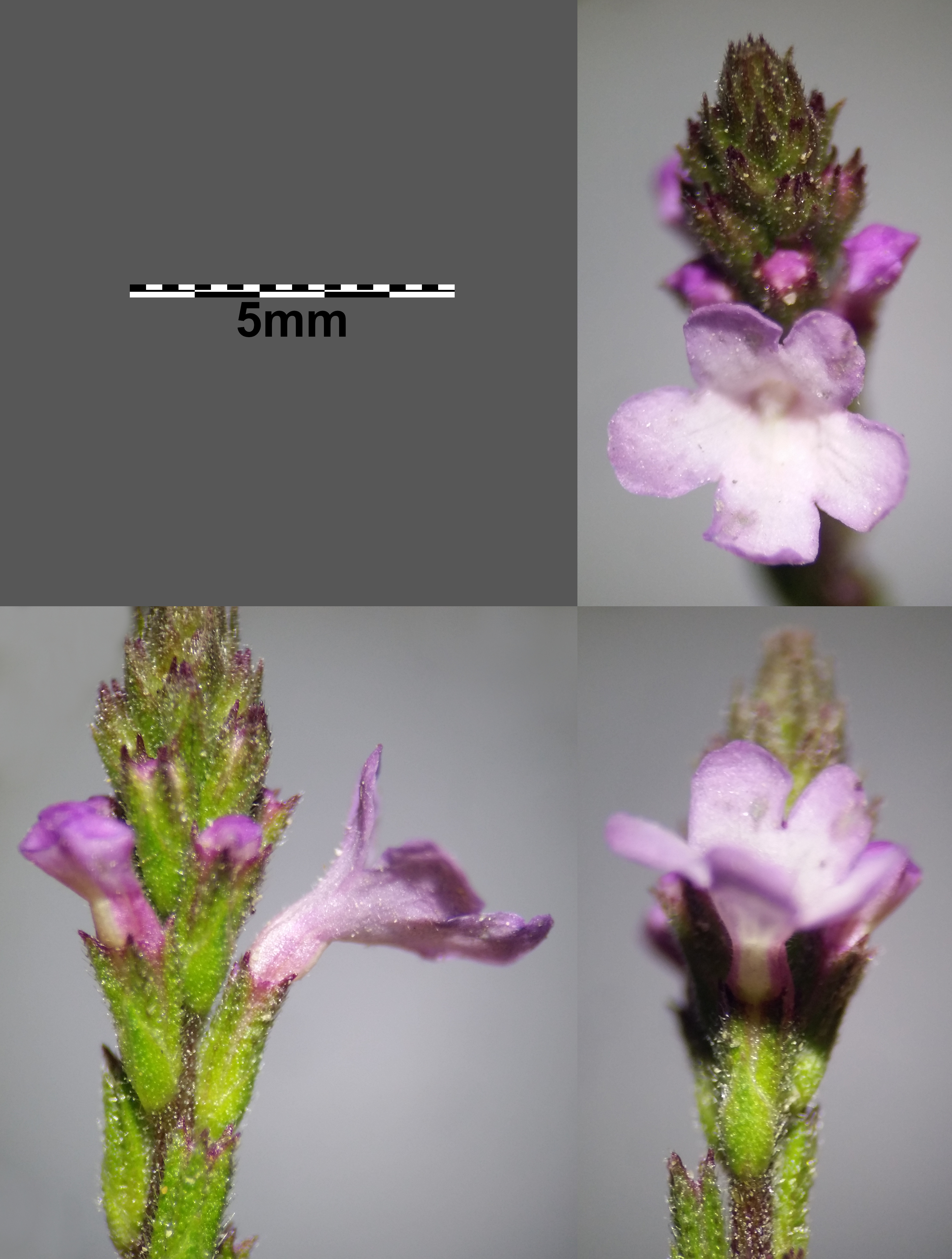
Flowers and pubescent calyces with 5-mm scale

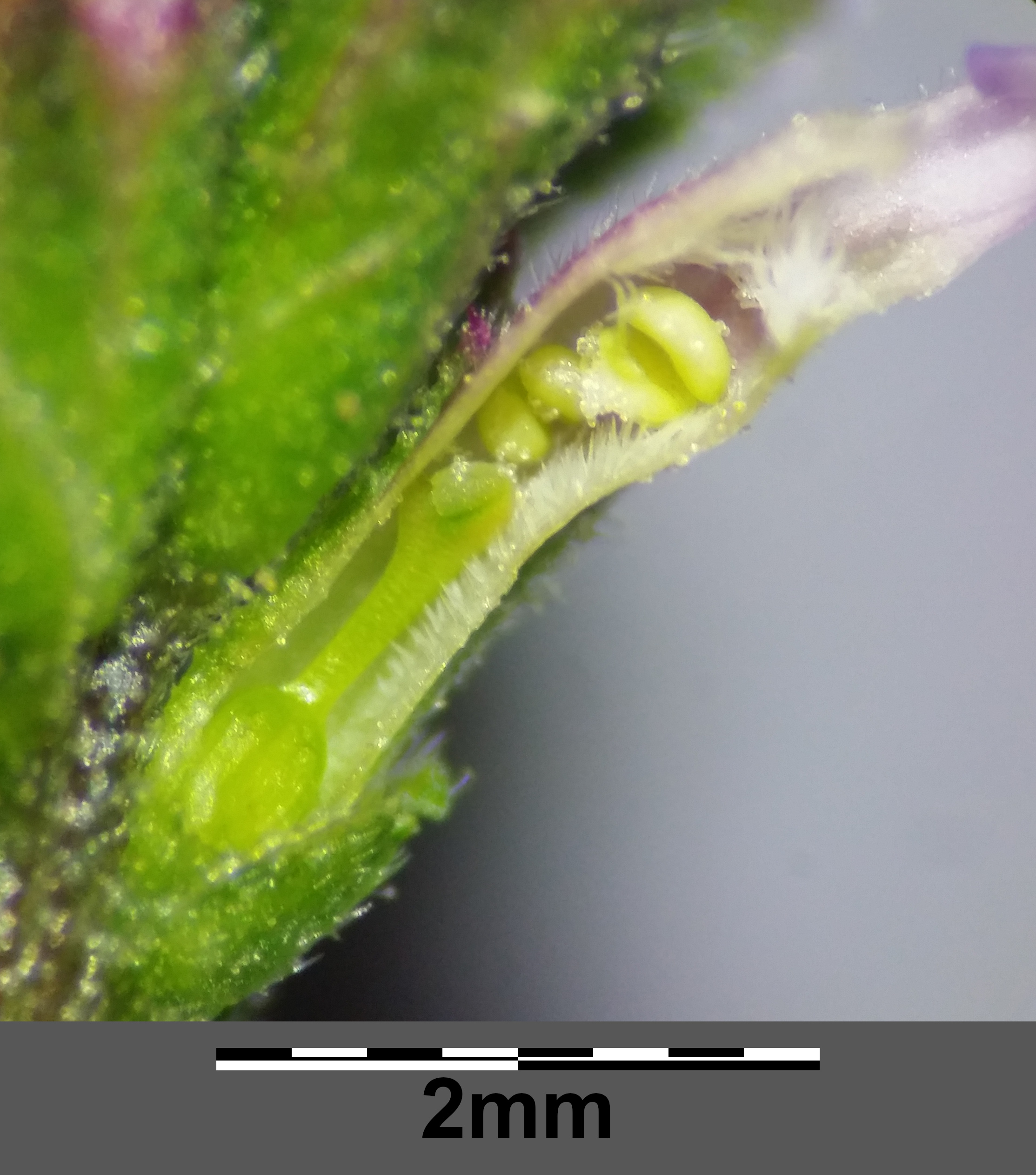
Internal flower anatomy

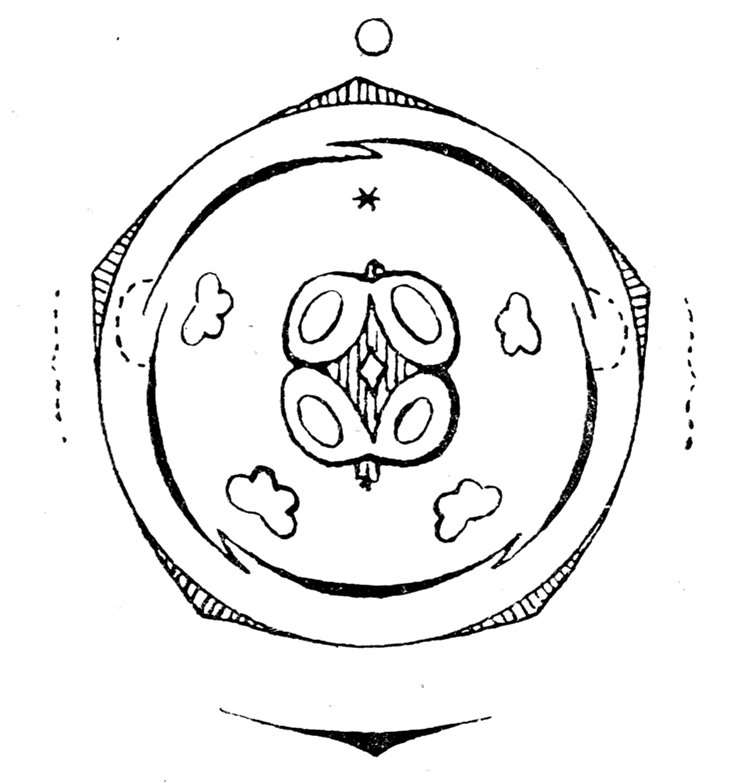
Floral diagram showing corolla aestivation

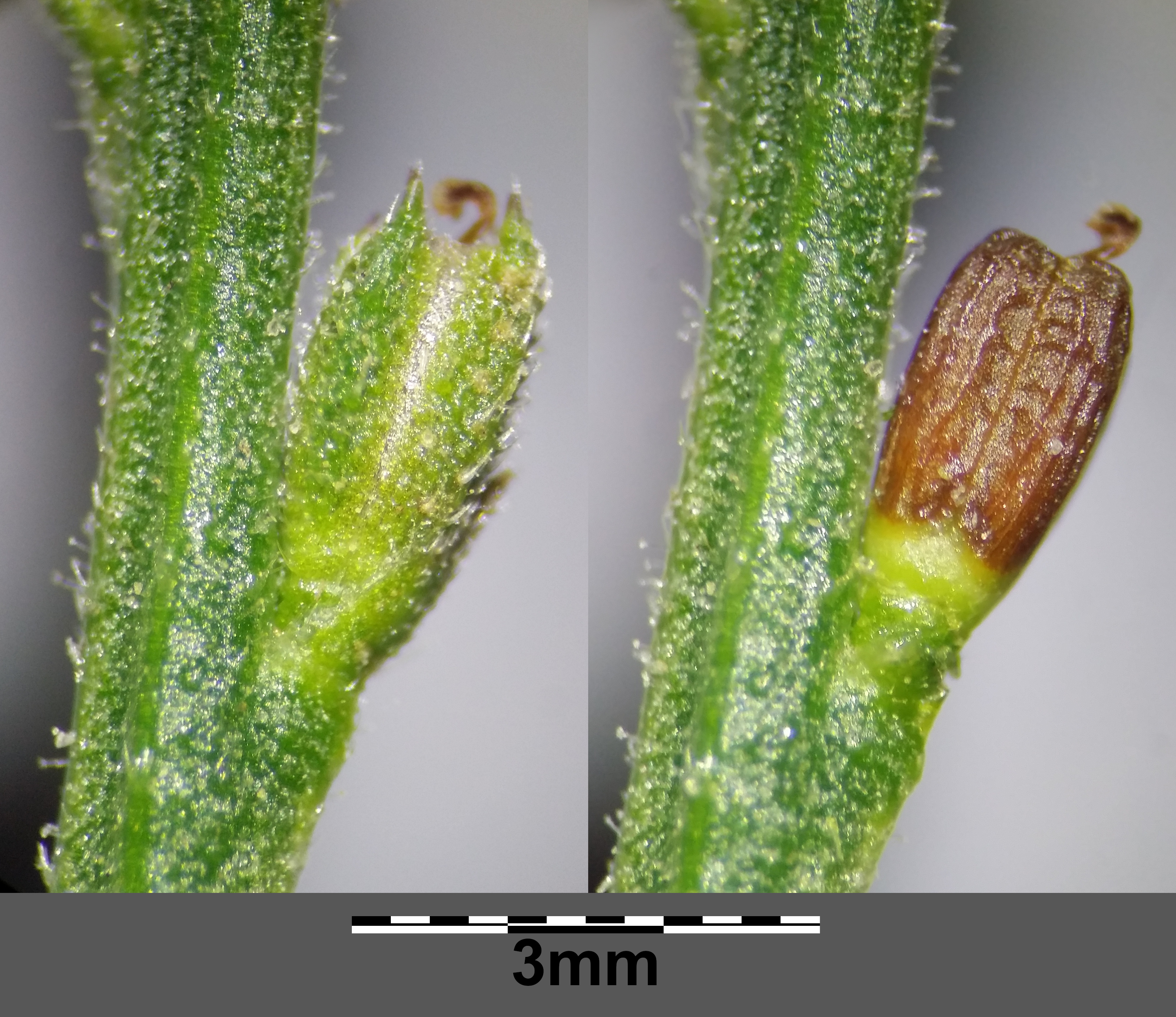
Fruits (still attached to plant), with calyx removed on right

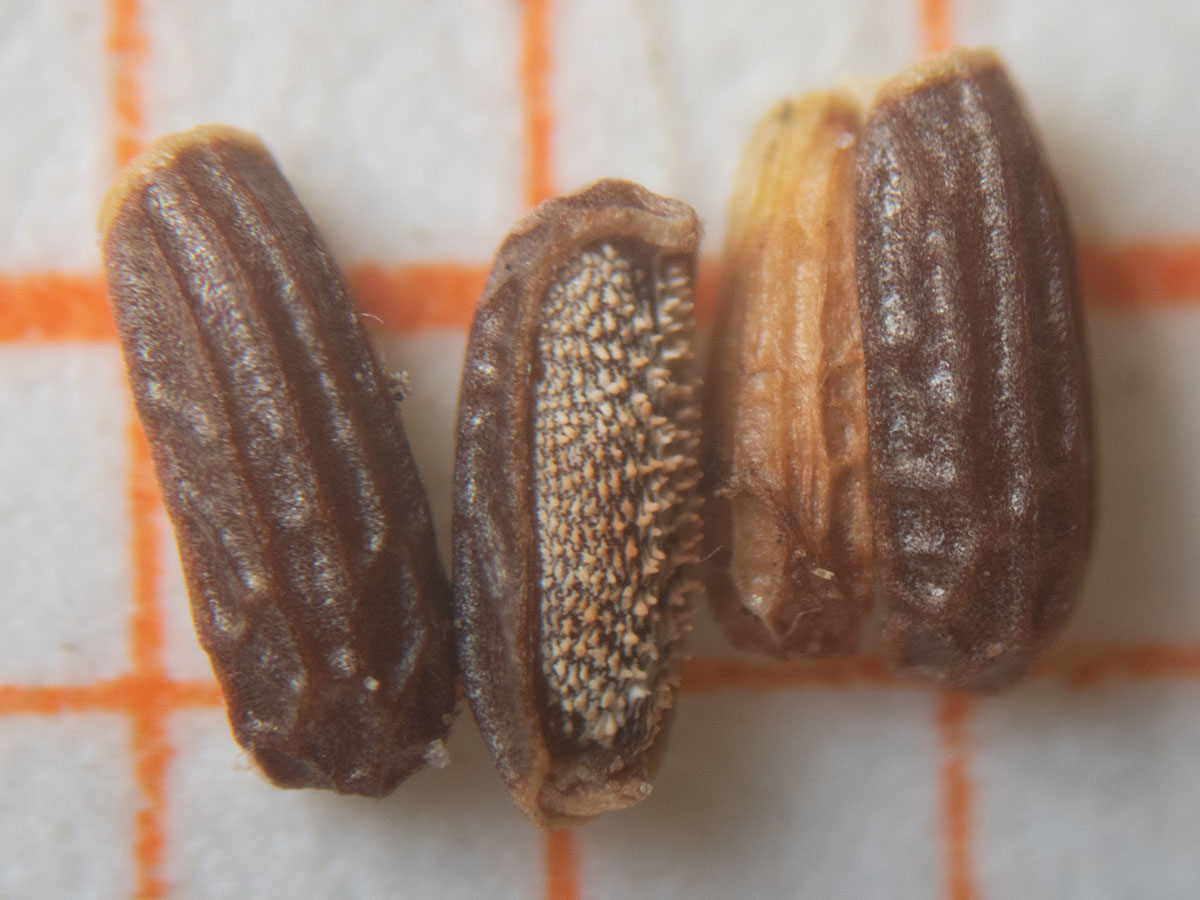
Fruits close-up

=== Chemistry ===
Chemical investigations of petroleum ether and chloroform extracts led to the isolation of β-sitosterol, ursolic acid, oleanolic acid, 3-epiursolic acid, 3-epioleanolic acid and minor triterpenoids of derivatives of ursolic acid and oleanolic acids. Chromatographic purification of the methanol extract yield two iridoid glucosides (verbenalin and hastatoside), a phenylpropanoid glycoside, verbascoside and β-sitosterol-D-glucoside. Hastatoside and verbenalin have sleep-promoting (soporific) properties. It also contains a monoterpene alcohol called verbenol. In another study, four compounds were isolated and identified as apigenin, 4'-hydroxywogonin, verbenalin, and hastatoside. Aucubin has also been found as one of the active constituents.

== Taxonomy ==
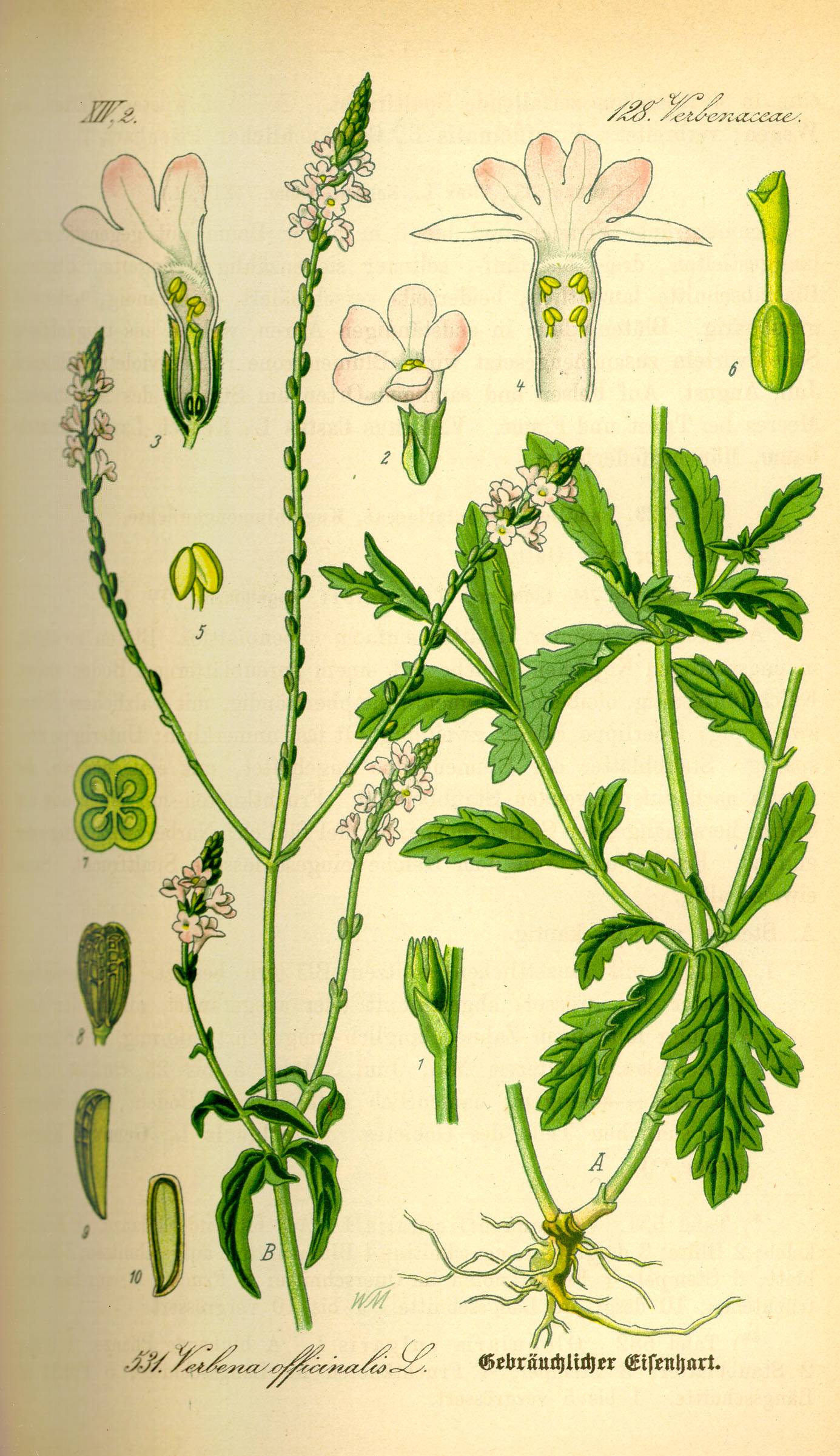
Coloured plate showing anatomical detail (Otto Wilhelm Thomé: Flora von Deutschland, Österreich und Schweiz)

Common vervain was scientifically described by Carl Linnaeus his 1753 Species Plantarum.

One of the few species of Verbena native to regions outside the Americas, it is derived from the lineage nowadays occurring widely across North America. It might be closest to a group including such species as the white vervain (V. urticifolia), V. lasiostachys or V. menthifolia, and perhaps the swamp verbena (V. hastata). As these, it is diploid with 14 chromosomes.

Numerous local varieties have been described, some of them as distinct species or subspecies. The following are often accepted today:

- Verbena officinalis var. africana (R. Fern. & Verdc.) Munir (=V. officinalis ssp. africana R.Fern. & Verdc.)
- Verbena officinalis var. eremicola Munir
- Verbena officinalis var. gaudichaudii Briq.
- Verbena officinalis var. macrostachya (F. Muell.) Benth. (=V. macrostachya)
- Verbena officinalis var. monticola Munir
- Verbena officinalis var. officinalis L. (=V. domingensis)

The Texas vervain (V. halei) is sometimes included in V. officinalis as a subspecies or variety. But despite the outward similarity, biogeography alone strongly suggests there is really no justification to include this North American native here, and DNA sequence data agrees. Instead, V. halei seems to be closely related to V. macdougalii, perhaps with some interbreeding with the V. menthifolia lineage, which might explain its similarities to common vervain.

=== Etymology ===
The scientific name of the genus references the Ancient Roman term verbena, used for any sacrificial herb considered very powerful (as described e.g. by Pliny the Elder). Officinalis, meanwhile, is Latin for "used in medicine or herbalism".

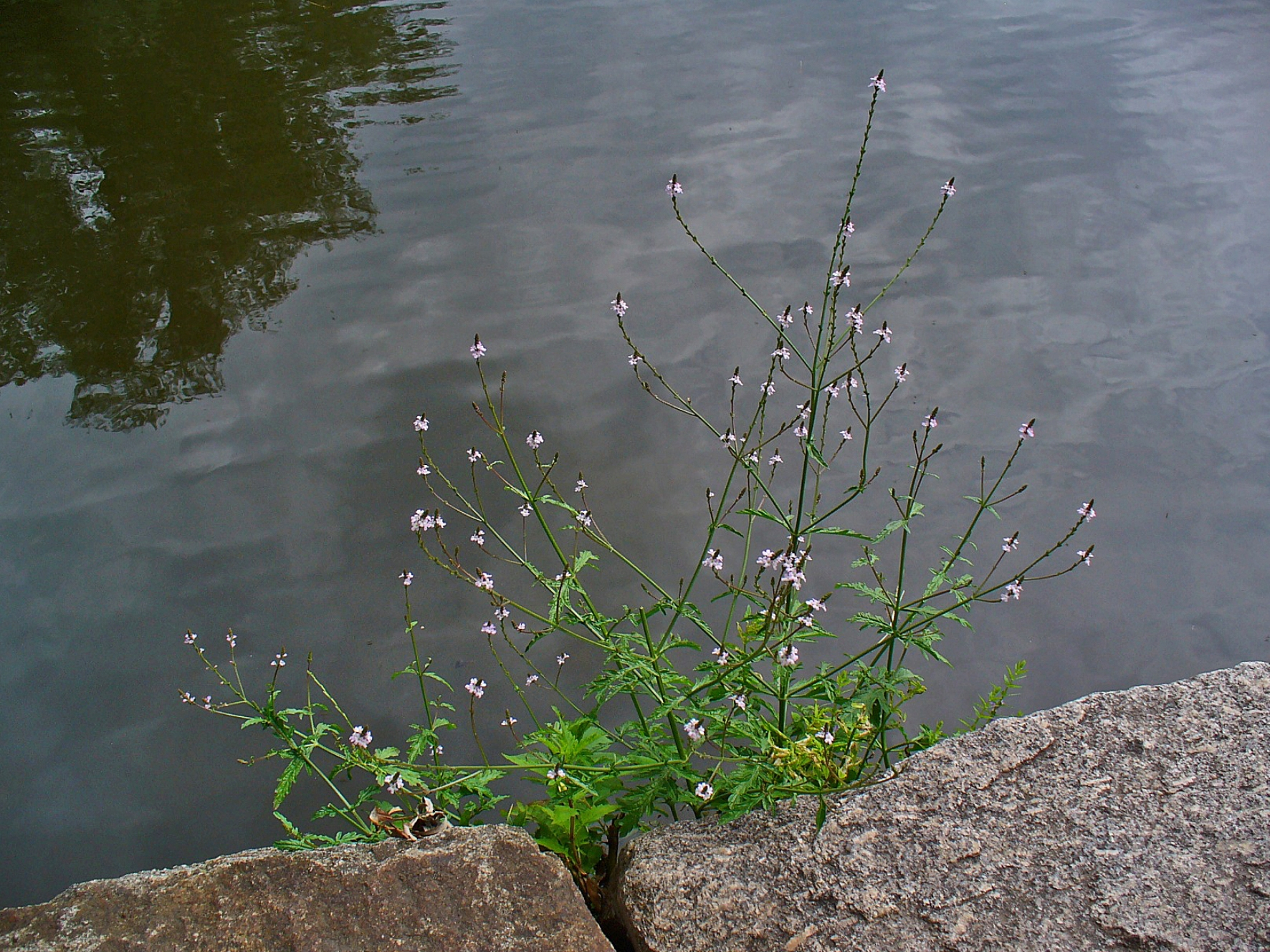
Plant growing chasmophytically out of waterside stone wall

== Distribution and habitat ==
The plant is native to Europe but is widely naturalised outside its native range, for example in North America. It prefers limey soils.

== Uses ==
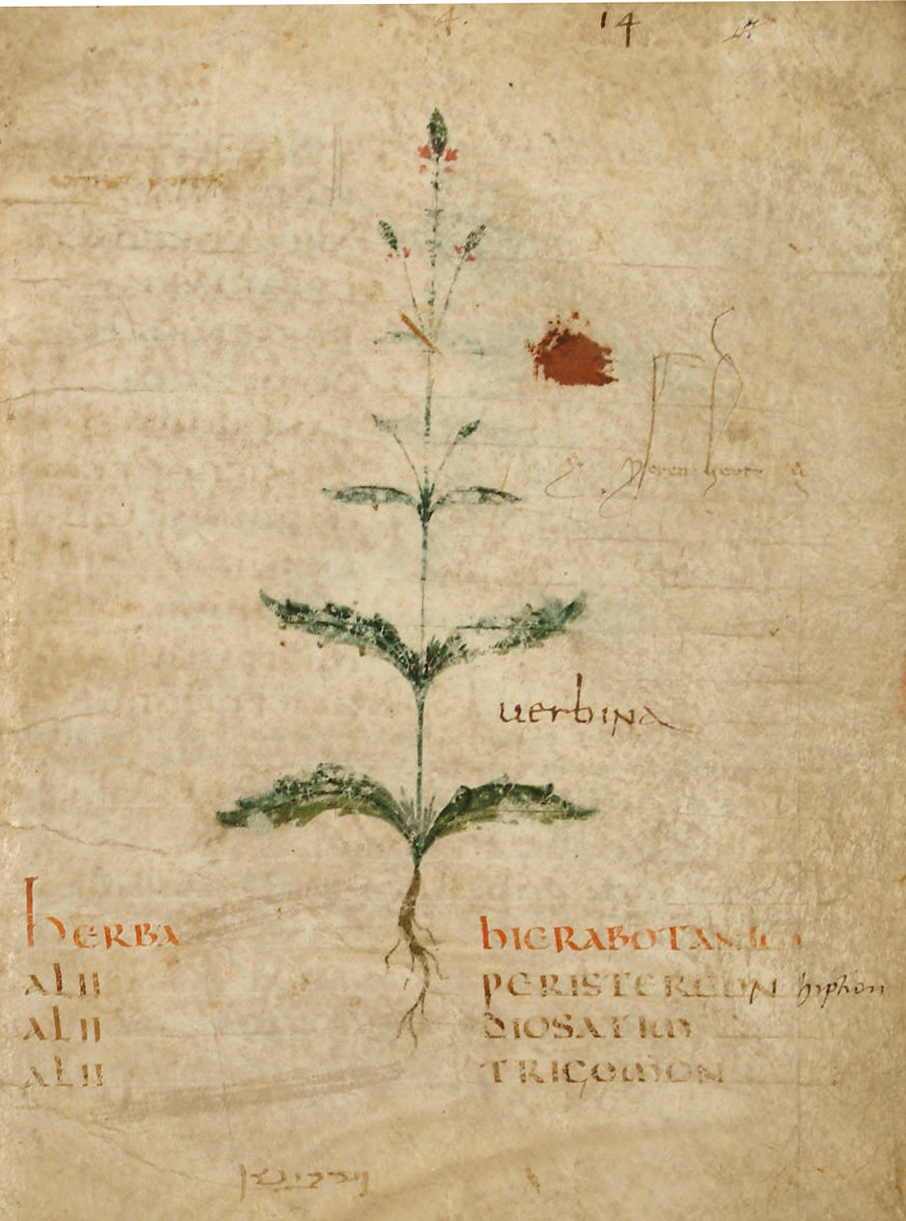
In a 4th-century herbal, Pseudo-Apuleius

Common vervain has been held in high esteem since classical antiquity; it has long been associated with divine and other supernatural forces, and it has an equally long-standing use as a medicinal plant. Herbal capsules are used as a soporific drug in much the same way as for the better known valerian.

Verbena officinalis herb has been used in the traditional Austrian medicine internally (as tea or liqueur) for treatment of infections and fever. Medical use of Common Vervain is usually as a herbal tea; Nicholas Culpeper's 1652 The English Physitian discusses folk uses. "Vervain", presumably this species, is one of the original 38 Bach flower remedies, prescribed against "over-enthusiasm". In the modern era, it is sometimes considered a powerful "ally" of poets and writers, as its relaxing effects can relieve writer's block. It cannot be considered safe to use during pregnancy as it might cause miscarriages.

While common vervain is not native to North America, it has been introduced there and the Pawnee have adopted it as an entheogen enhancer and in oneiromancy, and is often referred to as the North American version of Calea zacatechichi.

It is occasionally grown as an ornamental plant but perhaps more often for the powerful properties some herbalists ascribe to it. Propagation is by root cuttings or seed.

In western Eurasia, the term "verbena" or "vervain" usually refers to this, the most widespread and common member of the mostly American genus occurring there.

In early medieval Europe, some accounts stated that Common Vervain was used to staunch Jesus' wounds after his removal from the cross; hence names like "Holy Herb" or (e.g. in Wales) "Devil's bane". Because of the association with the Passion of Christ, it came to be used in ointments to drive out and repel "demonic" illnesses.

== In culture ==
It was called "tears of Isis" in Ancient Egypt, and later on "Juno's tears". In Ancient Greece, it was dedicated to Eos Erigineia.

Vervain flowers are engraved on cimaruta, Italian anti-stregheria charms. In the 1870 The History and Practice of Magic by "Paul Christian" (Jean-Baptiste Pitois) it is employed in the preparation of a mandragora charm.

A Royal Navy Arabis-class sloop of the World War I era was named HMS Verbena, and in World War II a Group 1 Flower-class corvette bore the same name; a Group 2 vessel of the latter class was called HMS Vervain. The only Verbena widely found in England in a wild state is common vervain, though it is just as possible that the names reference the popular ornamental verbenas, such as the garden vervain.

=== Regional common names ===
It is known also as simpler's joy or holy herb, or more ambiguously as mosquito plant or wild hyssop. The common name blue vervain is also sometimes used, but also refers to V. hastata. Being the only member of its genus in much of its range, it is also simply known as vervain locally.

The common names of V. officinalis in many Central and Eastern European languages often associate it with iron, for example:

- Echtes Eisenkraut (German: "true ironherb")
- IJzerhard (Dutch: "iron-hard")
- Læge-Jernurt (Danish: "medical ironherb")
- Železník lekársky (Slovak: "medical ironherb")
- Rohtorautayrtti (Finnish: "medical ironherb")
- Közönséges vasfű (Hungarian: "common irongrass")
