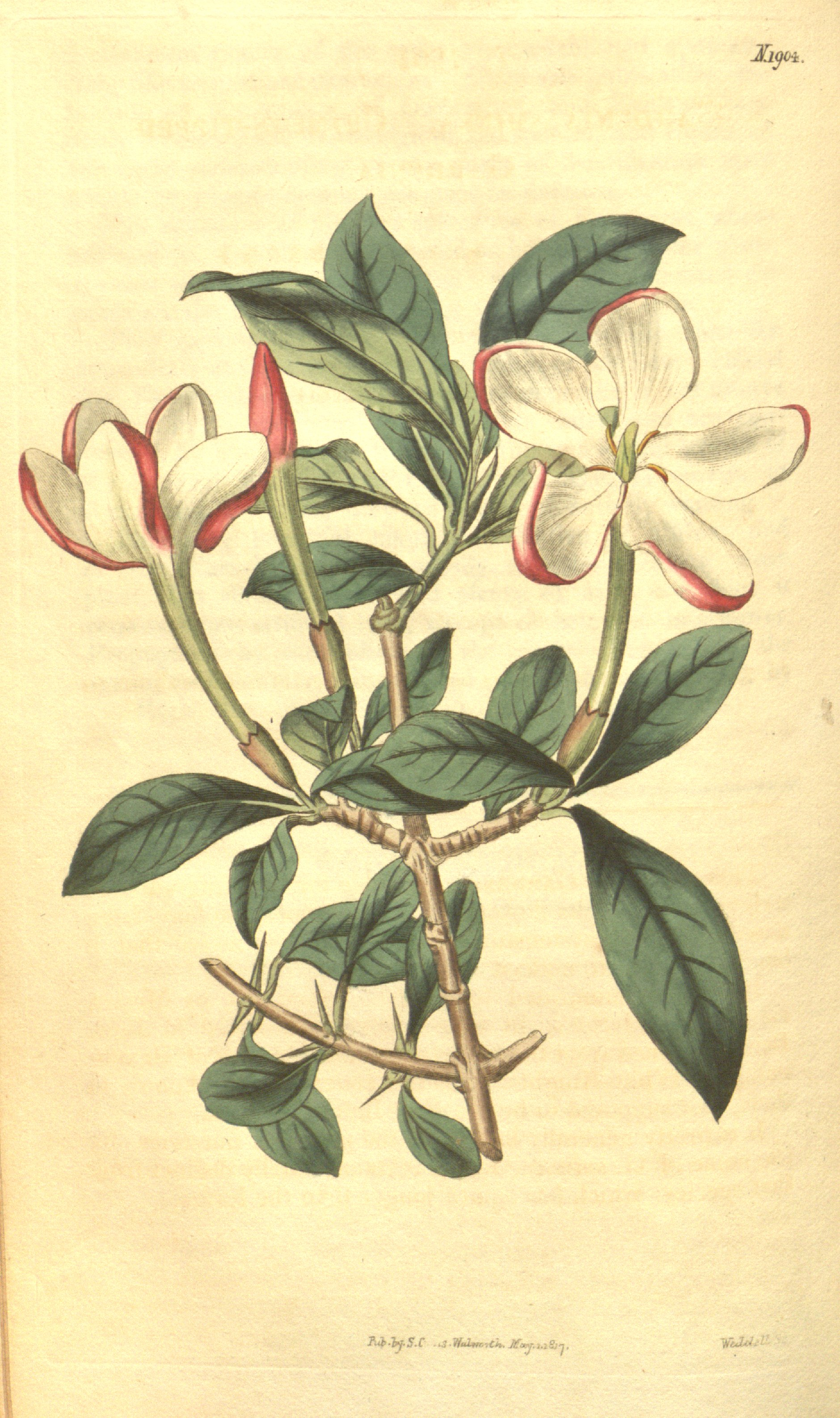
- Hyperacanthus amoenus

Scientific classification
- Kingdom: Plantae
- Clade: Tracheophytes
- Clade: Angiosperms
- Clade: Eudicots
- Clade: Asterids
- Order: Gentianales
- Family: Rubiaceae
- Subfamily: Ixoroideae
- Tribe: Gardenieae
- Genus: Hyperacanthus; E.Mey. ex Bridson

Species
- 11-15, see text

= Hyperacanthus (plant) =

Genus of plants

Hyperacanthus is a flowering plant genus in the family Rubiaceae, occurring on Madagascar and nearby southern Africa, approximately from Mozambique to the southernmost parts of the continent.

This genus used to contain only 5 species, but the number has tripled since a number of plants formerly believed to be genip-trees – the "Genipa sensu Drake" group – were recognized to be not as closely related to genips as was previously believed. Those species are now placed in Hyperacanthus, at least provisionally:

- Hyperacanthus ambovombensis Rakotonas. & A.P.Davis
- Hyperacanthus amoenus (Sims) Bridson
- Hyperacanthus exosolenius (formerly in Genipa, tentatively placed here)
- Hyperacanthus grevei Rakotonas. & A.P.Davis
- Hyperacanthus lantzianus (formerly in Genipa, tentatively placed here)
- Hyperacanthus lastellianus (formerly in Genipa, tentatively placed here)
- Hyperacanthus madagascariensis (Lam.) Rakotonas. & A.P.Davis (formerly in Genipa)
- Hyperacanthus mandenensis Rakotonas. & A.P.Davis
- Hyperacanthus microphyllus (K.Schum.) Bridson
- Hyperacanthus perrieri (Drake) Rakotonas. & A.P.Davis (formerly in Genipa)
- Hyperacanthus pervillei (Drake) Rakotonas. & A.P.Davis (formerly in Genipa)
- Hyperacanthus poivrei (Drake) Rakotonas. & A.P.Davis (formerly in Genipa)
- Hyperacanthus ravinensis (Baill. ex Drake) Rakotonas. & A.P.Davis (formerly in Genipa)
- Hyperacanthus talangninia (DC.) Rakotonas. & A.P.Davis (formerly in Genipa)
- Hyperacanthus tubulosus (formerly in Genipa, tentatively placed here)
