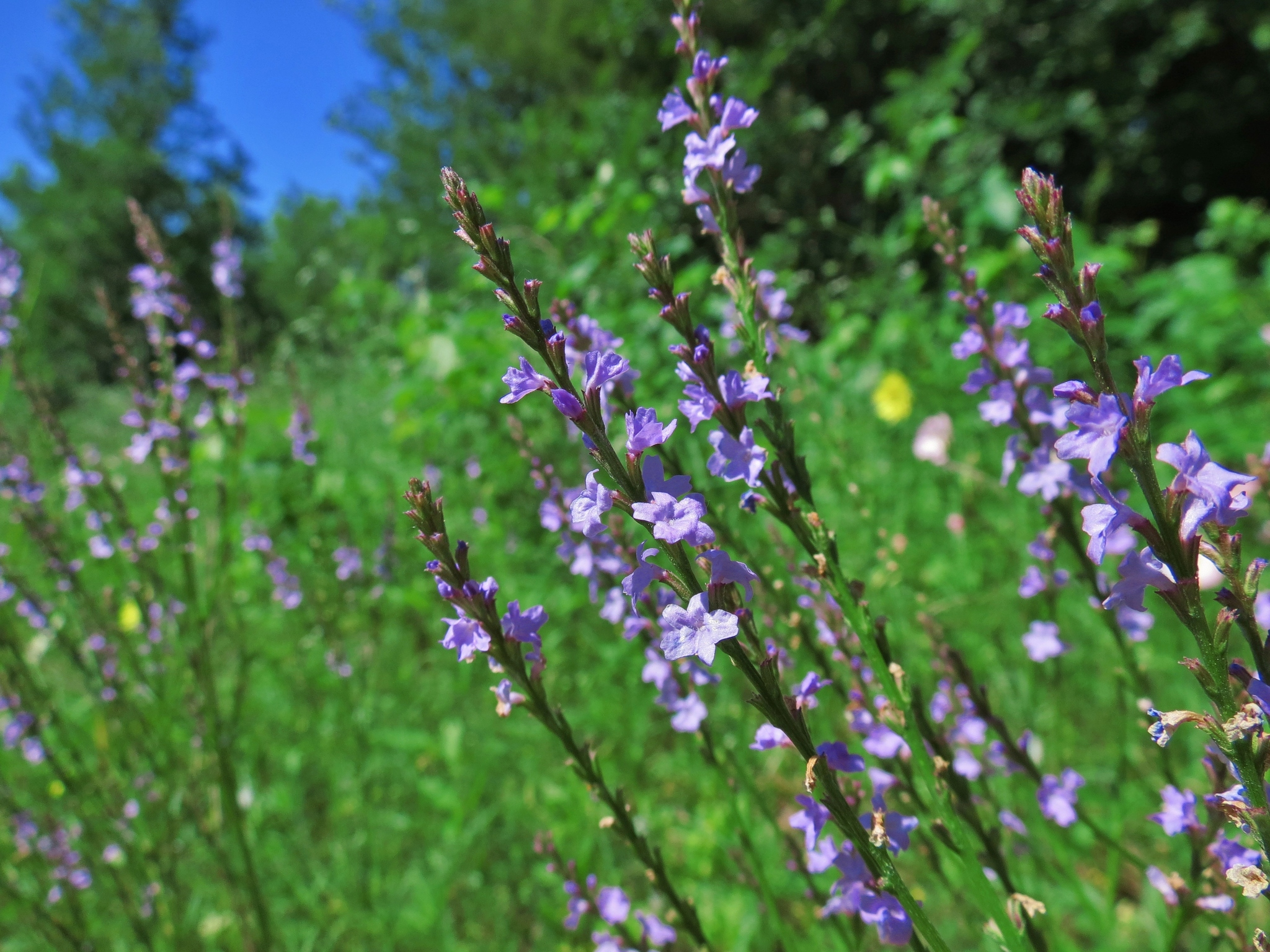

Scientific classification
- Kingdom: Plantae
- Clade: Tracheophytes
- Clade: Angiosperms
- Clade: Eudicots
- Clade: Asterids
- Order: Lamiales
- Family: Verbenaceae
- Genus: Verbena
- Species: V. halei

Binomial name
- Verbena halei Small

Synonyms
- Verbena gaudichaudii (Briq.) P.W.Michael; Verbena leucanthemifolia Greene; Verbena officinalis var. gaudichaudii Briq.; Verbena officinalis var. halei (Small) Munir; Verbena officinalis var. hirsuta Torr.; Verbena officinalis f. roseiflora Benkr

= Verbena halei =

Species of plant

Verbena halei, commonly known as Texas vervain, Texas verbena, or slender verbena, is a flowering plant in the vervain family, Verbenaceae. It is native to much of the southern United States and Mexico. Scattered populations have been found along the east coast (North Carolina), and its range stretches south to Florida, west to Arizona, and throughout most of Mexico. It is a perennial shrub and grows in thickets and woodland borders. Flowers bloom March to June. It has been introduced to Australia, in Queensland, New South Wales, Victoria, and South Australia.

The flowers of the Verbena halei are trumpet shaped and grow in loose clusters along the top of the branches in colors that range from blue to purple. Each branch holds a few flowers, with each flower having only five petals. It has a square stem and grows small, dry fruits called schizocarps.

It was first formally named by American botanist John Kunkel Small in 1898. It is sometimes considered a subspecies or variety of Verbena officinalis.

== Habitat ==
This species of Verbena grows in warm climates and in a variety of soils including sand, loam, and clay. The plant is drought tolerant.

== Ecosystem ==
Many animals use this plant as a food source. Birds such as the northern cardinal, junco, field sparrow, and song sparrow are known to eat the seeds of the Verbena halei. The cottontail rabbit is known to eat the whole plant.
