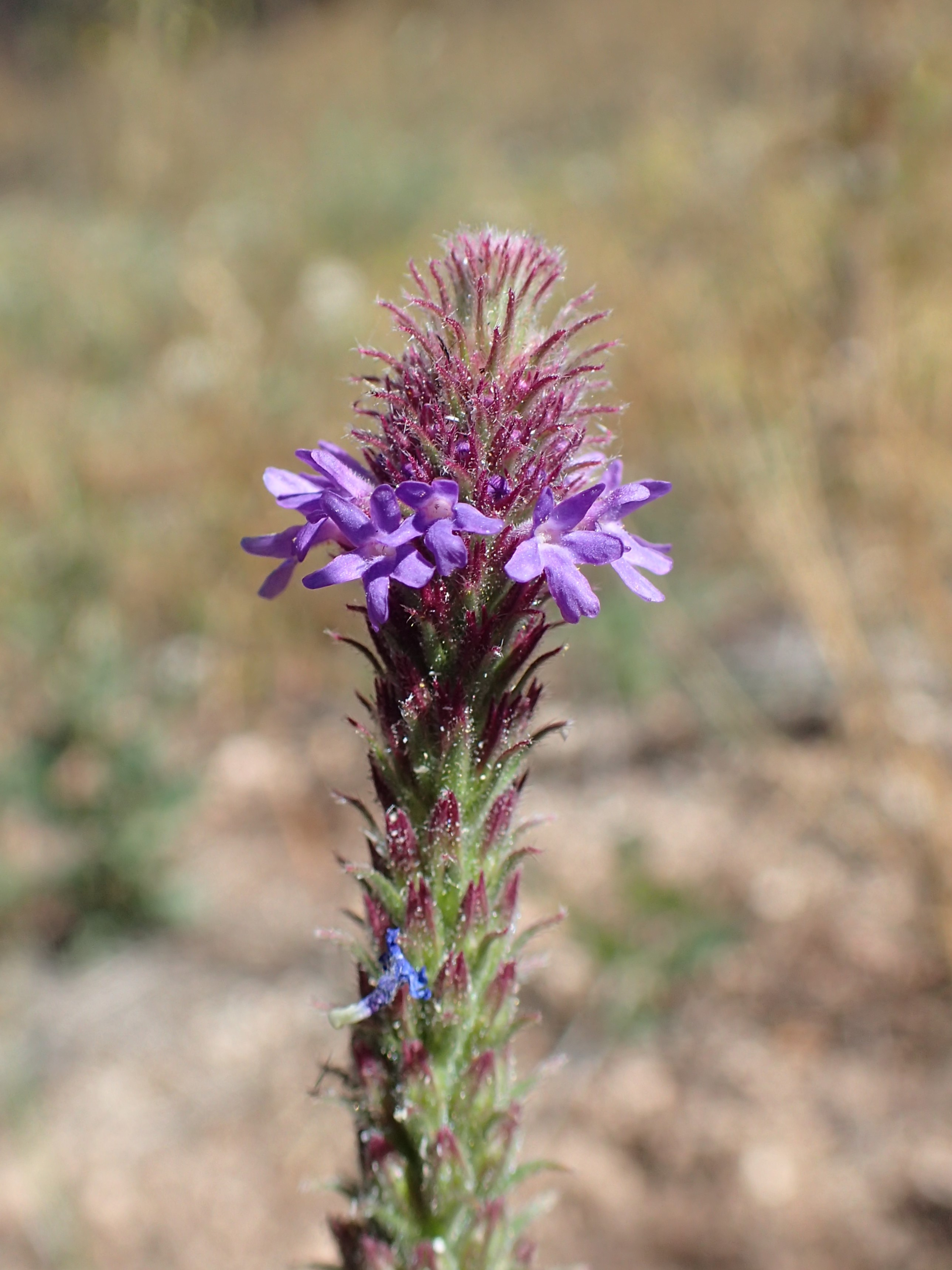

Scientific classification
- Kingdom: Plantae
- Clade: Tracheophytes
- Clade: Angiosperms
- Clade: Eudicots
- Clade: Asterids
- Order: Lamiales
- Family: Verbenaceae
- Genus: Verbena
- Species: V. macdougalii

Binomial name
- Verbena macdougalii A.Heller

= Verbena macdougalii =

Species of flowering plant

Verbena macdougalii is a species of verbena known by several common names, including MacDougal verbena, New Mexico vervain, hillside verbena, and spike verbena. It is a perennial herbaceous flowering plant in the verbena family (Verbenaceae). V. macdougalii is the most common tall verbena in New Mexico, where it can be found in mountainous regions across the state. It also occurs in Arizona, Utah, Colorado, and west Texas.

Verbena macdougalii grows at elevations of 5,900 to 9,000 feet in open flats, valleys, and in disturbed areas such as roadsides. It produces three or more tall, thick spikes, each with a ring of small, blue or purple flowers, and can reach about 3 feet in height. Its stems are four-sided and very hairy. It can be distinguished from the similar species Verbena hastata by the fact that V. macdougalii has thicker spikes and that the hair on its stems is spreading.
