= Genipin =

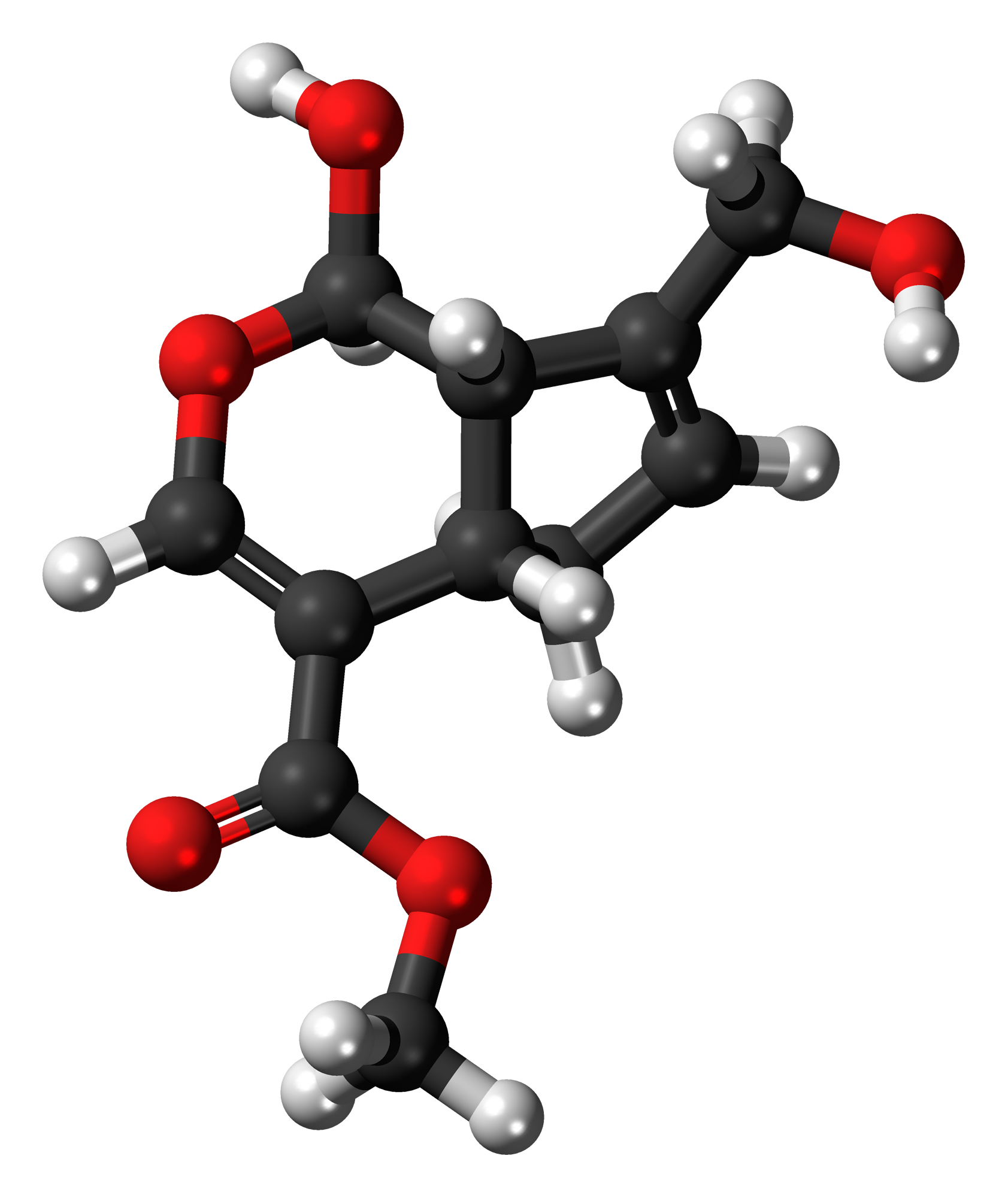

Names
- Preferred IUPAC name Methyl (1R,4aS,7aS)-1-hydroxy-7-(hydroxymethyl)-1,4a,5,7a-tetrahydrocyclopenta[c]pyran-4-carboxylate

Identifiers
CAS Number	6902-77-8
3D model (JSmol)	Interactive image
ChEMBL	ChEMBL459016
ChemSpider	390864
ECHA InfoCard	100.164.015
KEGG	C09780
PubChem CID	442424
UNII	A3V2NE52YG
CompTox Dashboard (EPA)	DTXSID30894999
- InChI: InChI=1S/C11H14O5/c1-15-10(13)8-5-16-11(14)9-6(4-12)2-3-7(8)9/h2,5,7,9,11-12,14H,3-4H2,1H3/t7-,9-,11-/m1/s1 Key: AZKVWQKMDGGDSV-BCMRRPTOSA-N; InChI=1/C11H14O5/c1-15-10(13)8-5-16-11(14)9-6(4-12)2-3-7(8)9/h2,5,7,9,11-12,14H,3-4H2,1H3/t7-,9-,11-/m1/s1 Key: AZKVWQKMDGGDSV-BCMRRPTOBC
- SMILES: O=C(OC)\C1=C\O[C@@H](O)[C@@H]2\C(=C/C[C@H]12)CO

Properties
Chemical formula	C_{11}H_{14}O_{5}
Molar mass	226.226 g/mol
- Except where otherwise noted, data are given for materials in their standard state (at 25 °C [77 °F], 100 kPa). verify (what is ?) Infobox references

Genipin is a chemical compound found in Genipa americana fruit extract. It is an aglycone derived from an iridoid glycoside called geniposide which is also present in fruit of Gardenia jasminoides.

Genipin is an excellent natural cross-linker for proteins, collagen, gelatin, and chitosan cross-linking. It has a low acute toxicity, with LD_{50} i.v. 382 mg/kg in mice, therefore, much less toxic than glutaraldehyde and many other commonly used synthetic cross-linking reagents. Furthermore, genipin can be used as a regulating agent for drug delivery, as the raw material for gardenia blue pigment preparation, and as the intermediate for alkaloid syntheses.

In vitro experiments have shown that genipin blocks the action of the transporter uncoupling protein 2.

== Gardenia blue ==
The pigment Gardenia blue (E165) is made by reacting genipin with soy protein hydrolysate.
