= Geniposide =

Chemical compound

- Skeletal formula of Geniposide

Names
- IUPAC name Methyl (1S,4aS,7aS)-1-(β-D-glucopyranosyloxy)-7-(hydroxymethyl)-1,4a,5,7a-tetrahydrocyclopenta[c]pyran-4-carboxylate
- Systematic IUPAC name Methyl (1S,4aS,7aS)-7-(hydroxymethyl)-1-{[(2S,3R,4S,5S,6R)-3,4,5-trihydroxy-6-(hydroxymethyl)oxan-2-yl]oxy}-1,4a,5,7a-tetrahydrocyclopenta[c]pyran-4-carboxylate
- Other names: Jasminoidin; Methyl 1-(hexopyranosyloxy)-7-(hydroxymethyl)-1,4a,5,7a-tetrahydrocyclopenta[c]pyran-4-carboxylate

Identifiers
CAS Number	24512-63-8
3D model (JSmol)	Interactive image
ChEBI	CHEBI:5299
ChEMBL	ChEMBL462894
ChemSpider	96987
ECHA InfoCard	100.208.687
EC Number	683-175-1
KEGG	C09781
MeSH	geniposide
PubChem CID	107848
UNII	145295QLXY
CompTox Dashboard (EPA)	DTXSID101318419
- InChI: InChI=1S/C17H24O10/c1-24-15(23)9-6-25-16(11-7(4-18)2-3-8(9)11)27-17-14(22)13(21)12(20)10(5-19)26-17/h2,6,8,10-14,16-22H,3-5H2,1H3/t8-,10-,11-,12-,13+,14-,16+,17+/m1/s1 Key: IBFYXTRXDNAPMM-BVTMAQQCSA-N
- SMILES: COC(=O)C1=COC(C2C1CC=C2CO)OC3C(C(C(C(O3)CO)O)O)O

Properties
Chemical formula	C_{17}H_{24}O_{10}
Molar mass	388.369 g·mol^{−1}
Melting point	245.23 °C (473.41 °F; 518.38 K)
Boiling point	641.4±55.0 °C at 760 mmHg
log P	−1.854
Acidity (pK_{a})	12.80±0.70

Hazards
- GHS labelling
Pictograms	(GHS06: Toxic)
Signal word	Danger
Hazard statements	H301
Precautionary statements	P264, P270, P301+P310, P321, P330, P405, P501
- Except where otherwise noted, data are given for materials in their standard state (at 25 °C [77 °F], 100 kPa). (what is ?) Infobox references

Geniposide, the glycoside form of genipin, is a bioactive iridoid glycoside that is found in a wide variety of medicinal herbs, such as Genipa americana y Gardenia jasminoides (fruits) . Geniposide shows several pharmacological effects (in vitro and in vivo) including neuroprotective, antidiabetic, hepatoprotective, anti-inflammatory, analgesic, antidepressant-like, cardioprotective, antioxidant, immune-regulatory, antithrombotic and antitumoral activity. These pharmacology benefits arise through the modulating action of geniposide on several proteins and genes that are associated with inflammatory and oxidative stress processes.

== Physiological activity ==
=== Neuroprotective ===
A growing body of evidence shows that the neuroprotective benefit of geniposide probably arises from its agonist action on the glucagon-like peptide-1(GLP-1R) receptor. When this receptor is activated neurotrophic effects were induced in cells, such as neurite outgrowth, reducing amyloid plaques, inhibiting τ phosphorylation, preventing memory impairment and loss of synapses, reducing oxidative stress and the chronic inflammatory response., These effects could be promising in the treatment of Alzheimer's and Parkinson's diseases.

=== Antidepressant-Like ===
Studies on depressive rats (induced by chronic unpredictable mild stress) have shown that the antidepressant effect of geniposide is similar to fluoxetine. This effect could be mediated by geniposide's effects on the hypothalamus–pituitary–adrenal (HPA) axis, whose dysfunction has been associated with the pathogenesis of depression. In a depressive state the serum levels of adrenocorticotropic hormone and cortisol are increased, as well as hypothalamic corticotropin-releasing hormone gene expression. The dysfunction of the HPA axis plays an important rule in the serotonergic system. When HPA axis shows high levels of activity, this leads to a hyper secretion of cortisol and corticotropin-releasing hormone, in the opposite case the serotonergic system suffers a downregulation and decreases its activity. Low serotonergic system activity results in hyporesponsivity of 5-hydroxytryptamine (5-HT) in the hippocampus. Geniposide was able to reverse the high levels of cortisol and hypothalamic corticotropin-releasing hormone gene expression, which lead to an increase of 5-HT in the hippocampus and 5-Hydroxyindoleacetic acid (5-HIAA) in striatum.

=== Antioxidant ===
Geniposide shows a reasonable capacity of induction of endogenous antioxidative proteins, which offer protection against cell injury by oxidative stress. A study with hippocampal neurons revealed that geniposide could enhance cytoprotection, though the activation of the enzyme Phosphoinositide 3-kinases (PI3K) and the induction of the nuclear translocation of nuclear factor erythroid 2-related factor 2 (NRF2). The PI3K/NRF2 pathway signaling triggers several responses, such as the expression of antioxidative enzymes heme oxygenase (HO-1), superoxide dismutase (SOD) and NAD(P)H dehydrogenase quinone 1 (NQO1), reducing accumulation of reactive oxygen species (ROS).

=== Anti-inflammatory ===
Several studies have shown geniposide's potential to treat inflammatory diseases, such as arthritis, due to its effect in the production on cytokine and pro-inflammatory mediators. In rats with arthritis, oral administration of geniposide (30, 60, and 120 mg/kg) shows a decrease in T helper 17 cell cytokines such as interleukin-2 (IL-2) and an increase in regulatory T-cell cytokines in mesenteric lymph node lymphocytes, like interleukin-4 (IL-4) and transforming growth factor beta 1 (TGF-β1). Another study revealed that geniposide's effect was probably enhanced by immunoregulation in immunologic tissues, such as gut-associated lymphoid tissue (GALT). When regulating, the mesenteric lymph node triggers the amelioration of the JNK-mitogen-activated protein kinases (MAPKs) and p38 mitogen-activated protein kinases (p38MAPKs) signaling cascades. The same pathway was observed in peripheral blood lymphocytes.

=== Antidiabetic activity ===
Geniposide has been reported as having a hypoglycemic effect, which could be mediated by hepatic glucose-metabolizing enzymes, such as hepatic glycogen phosphorylase (GP) and glucose-6-phosphatase (G6Pase). GP and G6Pase are induced by chronic hyperglycemia. High levels of blood sugar increased their expression and activity, which lead to an increase in hepatic glucose production and unbalance the glucose metabolism. A study with the high-fat diet (HFD) - streptozotocin (STZ) diabetic mouse model using geniposides doses of 200 and 400 mg/kg has shown a significant decrease in body weight, blood glucose, insulin and triglycerides (TG) levels. An increase in the activity of GP and G6Pas was also observed in this diabetic mouse model, but when the same geniposide doses were administered, activity decreased significantly.

== Pharmacokinetics ==
=== Absorption ===
Studies show that oral (50 mg/kg), intravenous (50 mg/kg) and intramuscular (8 mg/kg) administration of Geniposide follow a one-compartment model and nasal administration (8 mg/kg) a two-compartment model. The absolute bioavailability is higher in intramuscular administration (F = 73%) followed by nasal administration (F = 50%).

=== Distribution ===
In rats, after an oral administration of geniposide (200 mg/kg) the highest tissue concentration was observed in the kidney (1.12 ± 0.37 μg/ml) with a tmax of 2h. The tissue distribution, measured in terms of AUC0→4h values, follows kidney > spleen > liver > heart > lung > brain.

=== Metabolism ===
Using ultrahigh-performance liquid chromatography 17 metabolites were identified in plasma and 31 in urine. In vivo, geniposide can follow two distinct metabolic pathways. The main metabolic pathway involves the hydrolysis of the hydroxyl groups followed by a series of reactions, such as taurine, sulfate and glucuronide conjugation.

=== Excretion ===
In humans, the majority of excretion of geniposide is urinary.

== Toxicity ==
Hepatoxicity is a safety issue of geniposide. Several studies in rats have shown an increase in serum alanine aminotransferase and aspartate aminotransferase activities (oral administration of 320 mg/kg body weight). A 2012 study linked geniposide hepatoxicity with oxidative stress, due to a decrease of total superoxide dismutase activity and an increase of malondialdehyde concentration in rats' livers. These results were associated only with a high dose of geniposide (greater than 574 mg/kg). A repeated dosing study has shown that geniposide is safe at a dosage of 24.3 mg/kg or less.

Acute nephrotoxicity was observed after an oral administration of geniposide (dose of 1.2 g/kg) on jaundice rats. Increases in serum levels of blood urea nitrogen and creatinine were detected.

Long-term oral intake of Chinese herbal liquid containing geniposide may play a role in the pathogenesis of idiopathic mesenteric phlebosclerosis.
