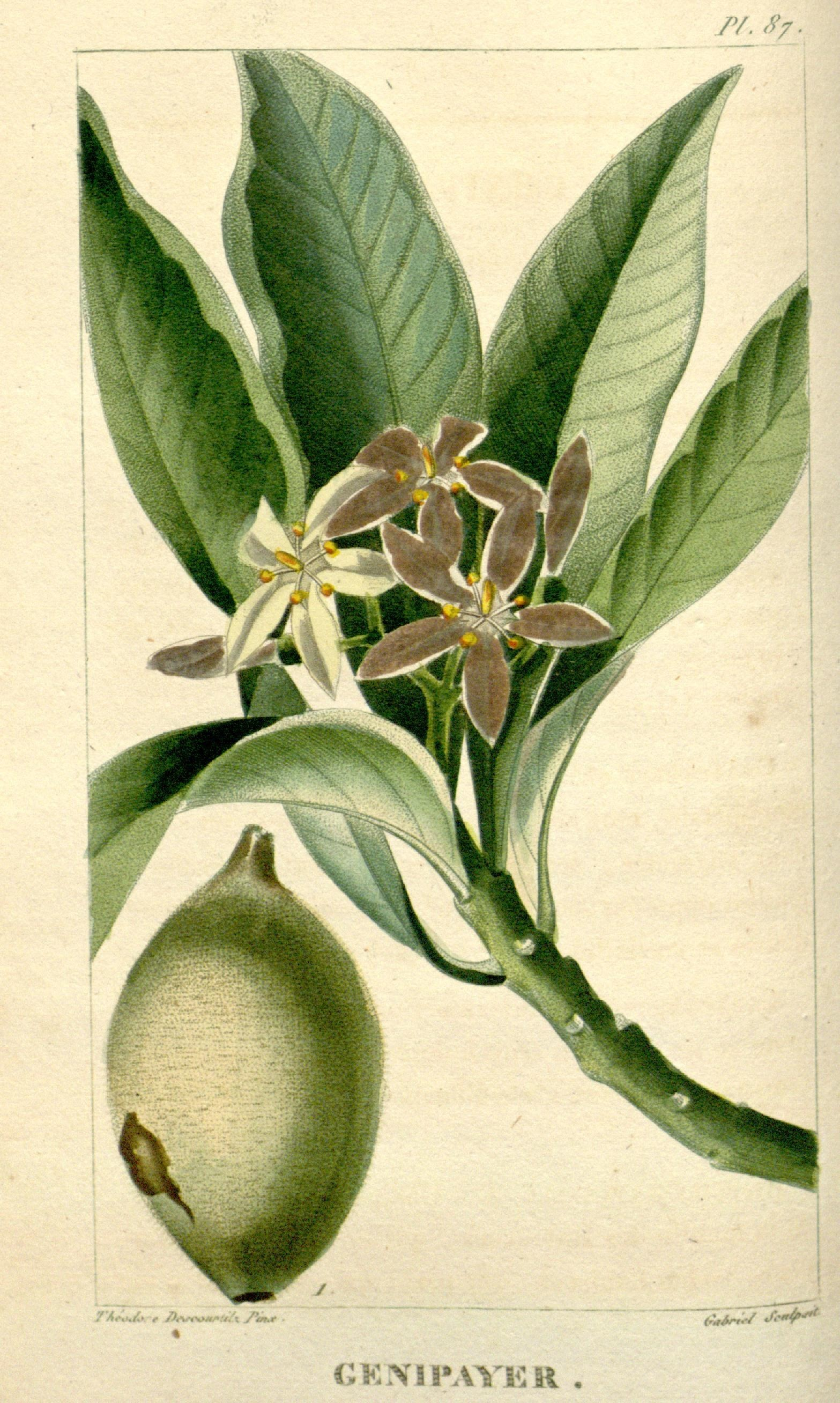
- Flower, fruit, and leaf of Genipa americana

Scientific classification
- Kingdom: Plantae
- Clade: Tracheophytes
- Clade: Angiosperms
- Clade: Eudicots
- Clade: Asterids
- Order: Gentianales
- Family: Rubiaceae
- Tribe: Gardenieae
- Genus: Genipa; L.

Species
- see text

= Genipa =

Genus of flowering plants

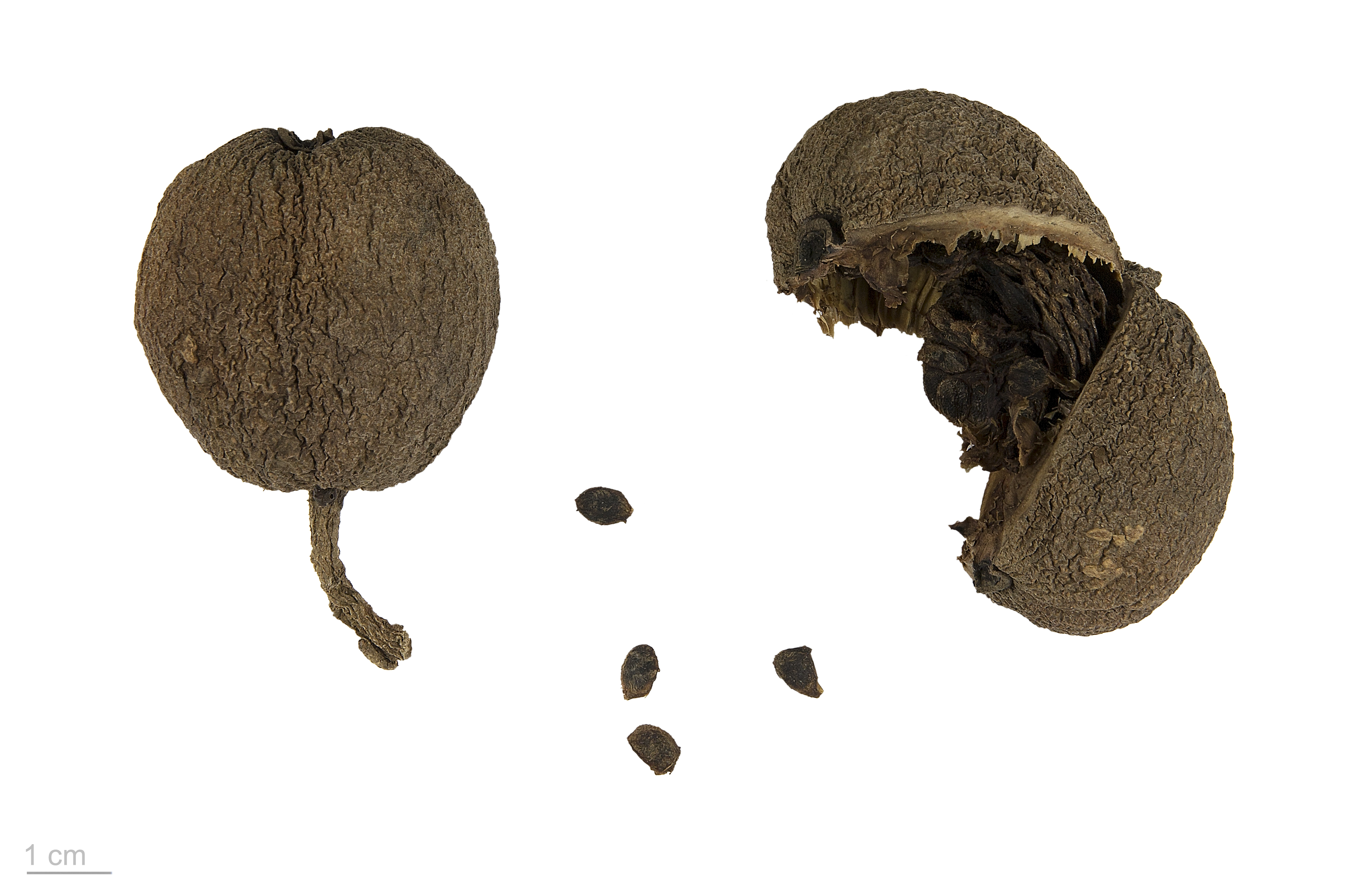
Genipa spruceana - MHNT

Genipa is a genus of trees in the family Rubiaceae. This genus is native to the American tropical forests.

== Description ==
Tall trees, without any spines, prickles or thorns; with large opposite leaves of almost leathery texture, smooth or hairy. Presence of interpetiolar stipules, triangle-shaped. The large flowers are arranged in terminal cymes; the calyx is tubular, while the corolla can be trumpet-shaped or short-cylindrical, with 5-6 lobes. The stamens are located at the top of the corolla. The fruit is an almost globose or ovoid berry, smooth, fleshy, with a thick rind. The seeds are large and flat.

== Taxonomy ==
The species from Madagascar, originally described by Drake, do not belong to the Rubiaceae tribe Gardenieae like the New World Genipa species, but in the tribe Octotropideae. Those species were transferred to the genus Hyperacanthus.

Genipa spruceana is considered doubtfully distinct from Genipa americana.

Species currently recognized in Genipa are:

- Genipa americana L.
- Genipa infundibuliformis Zappi & J.Semir
- Genipa spruceana Steyerm.

== Distribution and habitat ==
The genus is native to the tropical forests of America, including Florida.
