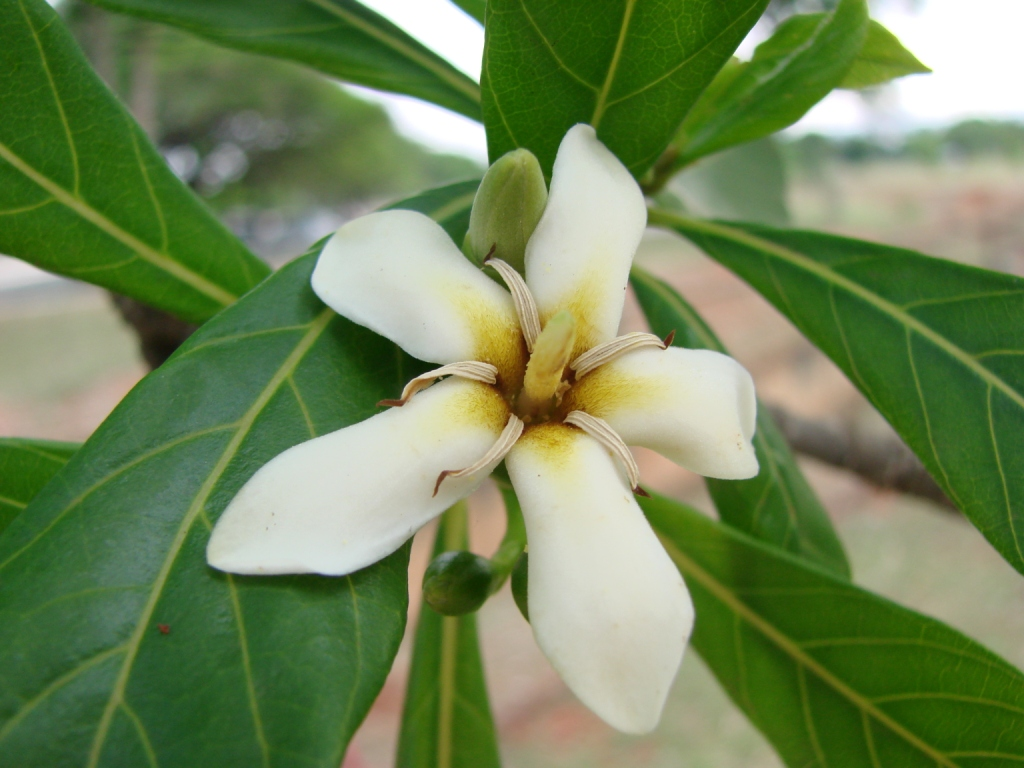
- Flower

Conservation status
- Least Concern (IUCN 3.1)

Scientific classification
- Kingdom: Plantae
- Clade: Embryophytes
- Clade: Tracheophytes
- Clade: Spermatophytes
- Clade: Angiosperms
- Clade: Eudicots
- Clade: Asterids
- Order: Gentianales
- Family: Rubiaceae
- Genus: Genipa
- Species: G. americana

Binomial name
- Genipa americana L.

Synonyms
- List: Genipa americana var. caruto K.Schum.; Genipa americana var. riobranquensis Kuhlm.; Genipa americana f. grandifolia Chodat & Hassl.; Genipa americana f. jorgensenii Steyerm.; Genipa americana f. parvifolia Chodat & Hassl.; Genipa barbata Presl; Genipa brasiliana A.Rich.; Genipa brasiliensis (Spreng.) Baill.; Genipa caruto Kunth; Genipa codonocalyx Standl.; Genipa excelsa K.Krause; Genipa grandifolia Pers.; Genipa humilis Vell.; Genipa oblongifolia Ruiz & Pav.; Genipa oleosa Rojas; Genipa pubescens DC.; Genipa venosa Standl.

= Genipa americana =

Species of plant

Genipa americana (/ˈdʒɛnɪpə/) is a species of trees in the family Rubiaceae. It is native to the tropical forests of North and South America, as well as the Caribbean.

== Description ==
Genipa americana trees are up to 30 m tall and up to 60 cm dbh. Their bark is smooth with little fissures. The leaves are opposite, obovate, or obovate oblong, 10–35 cm long, 6–13 cm wide, and glossy dark green, with entire margin, acute or acuminate apex, and attenuated base. The inflorescences are cymes up to 10 cm long. The flowers are white to yellowish, slightly fragrant, calyx bell-shaped, corolla at 2–4.5 cm long, trumpet-shaped, and five- or six-lobed. The five short stamens are inserted on top of the corolla tube. The fruit is a thick-skinned edible greyish berry 10–12 cm long, 5–9 cm in diameter.

== Distribution and habitat ==
Genipa americana is native to the tropical forests of the Americas, from the Caribbean south to Argentina. It is present from sea level up to 1200 m of elevation, although some argue the original native range as being northern South America.

== Vernacular names ==
In English, the tree is known as the genip tree /ˈdʒɛnɪp/ and the fruit as genipap /ˈdʒɛnɪpæp/.

Colombia: jagua, caruto, huito; Brazil: jenipapo, formerly genipapo; Costa Rica: guaitil, tapaculo; Nicaragua: tapaculo, yigualtí; Mexico: shagua, xagua, maluco; Perú: huito, vito, jagua; Argentina: ñandipá; Puerto Rico: jagua; Bolivia: bí

Its name has been reconstructed as we'e (*weʔe) in Proto-Tucanoan.

== Chemical compounds ==
The following compounds have been isolated from G. americana: genipic acid, genipinic acid, genipin (all three from the fruit) and geniposidic acid (leaves).

== Uses ==
The unripe fruit of G. americana yields a liquid used as a deep purple dye for tattoos, skin painting, insect repellent and food.

This species is also cultivated for its edible fruits, which are eaten in preserves or made into drinks, jelly, or ice cream.

The wood is resistant, strong, and easily worked; it is used in the making of utensils and in construction and carpentry.

== Gallery ==
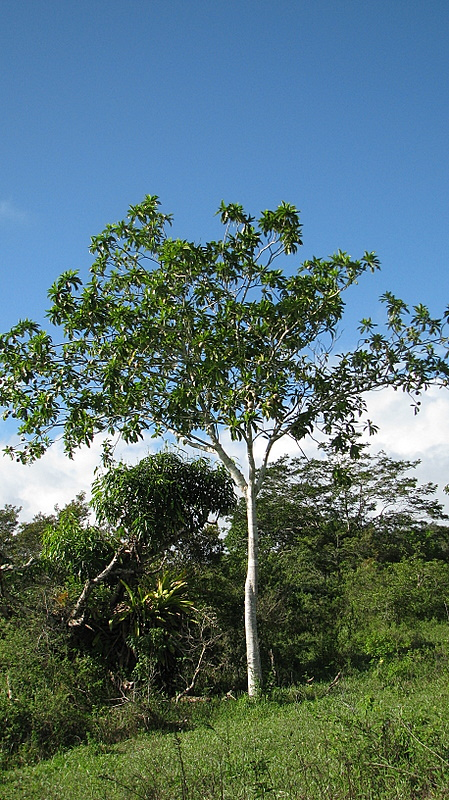
Tree

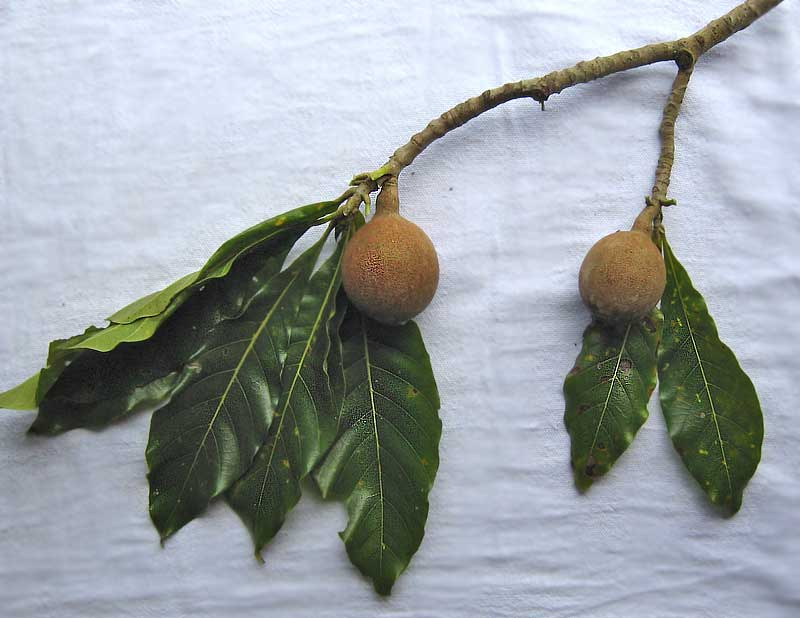
Leaves and fruits

== See also ==
- Jagua tattoo
