= Verbenalin =

Names
- IUPAC name Methyl (1S,4aS,7S,7aR)-1-(β-D-glucopyranosyloxy)-7-methyl-5-oxo-1,4a,5,6,7,7a-hexahydrocyclopenta[c]pyran-4-carboxylate
- Systematic IUPAC name Methyl (1S,4aS,7S,7aR)-7-methyl-5-oxo-1-{[(2S,3R,4S,5S,6R)-3,4,5-trihydroxy-6-(hydroxymethyl)oxan-2-yl]oxy}-1,4a,5,6,7,7a-hexahydrocyclopenta[c]pyran-4-carboxylate
- Other names Verbenalol β-D-glucopyranoside; Verbenalol glucoside; Cornin

Identifiers
| CAS Number | 548-37-8 |
| 3D model (JSmol) | Interactive image |
| ChemSpider | 66163 |
| PubChem CID | 73467 |
| UNII | 71B68181Z6 |
| CompTox Dashboard (EPA) | DTXSID50970143 |
- InChI: InChI=1S/C17H24O10/c1-6-3-8(19)11-7(15(23)24-2)5-25-16(10(6)11)27-17-14(22)13(21)12(20)9(4-18)26-17/h5-6,9-14,16-18,20-22H,3-4H2,1-2H3/t6-,9+,10+,11-,12+,13-,14+,16-,17-/m0/s1 Key: HLXRWTJXGMHOFN-XJSNKYLASA-N; InChI=1S/C17H24O10/c1-6-3-8(19)11-7(15(23)24-2)5-25-16(10(6)11)27-17-14(22)13(21)12(20)9(4-18)26-17/h5-6,9-14,16-18,20-22H,3-4H2,1-2H3/t6-,9+,10+,11-,12+,13-,14+,16-,17-/m0/s1 Key: HLXRWTJXGMHOFN-XJSNKYLASA-N
- SMILES: C[C@H]1CC(=O)[C@H]2[C@@H]1[C@@H](OC=C2C(=O)OC)O[C@H]3[C@@H]([C@H]([C@@H]([C@H](O3)CO)O)O)O

Properties
| Chemical formula | C_{17}H_{24}O_{10} |
| Molar mass | 388.369 g·mol^{−1} |
- Except where otherwise noted, data are given for materials in their standard state (at 25 °C [77 °F], 100 kPa). Infobox references

Verbenalin is a chemical compound, classified as an iridoid glucoside, that is found in Verbena officinalis. It is one of the sleep-promoting (soporific) components in Verbena officinalis.
