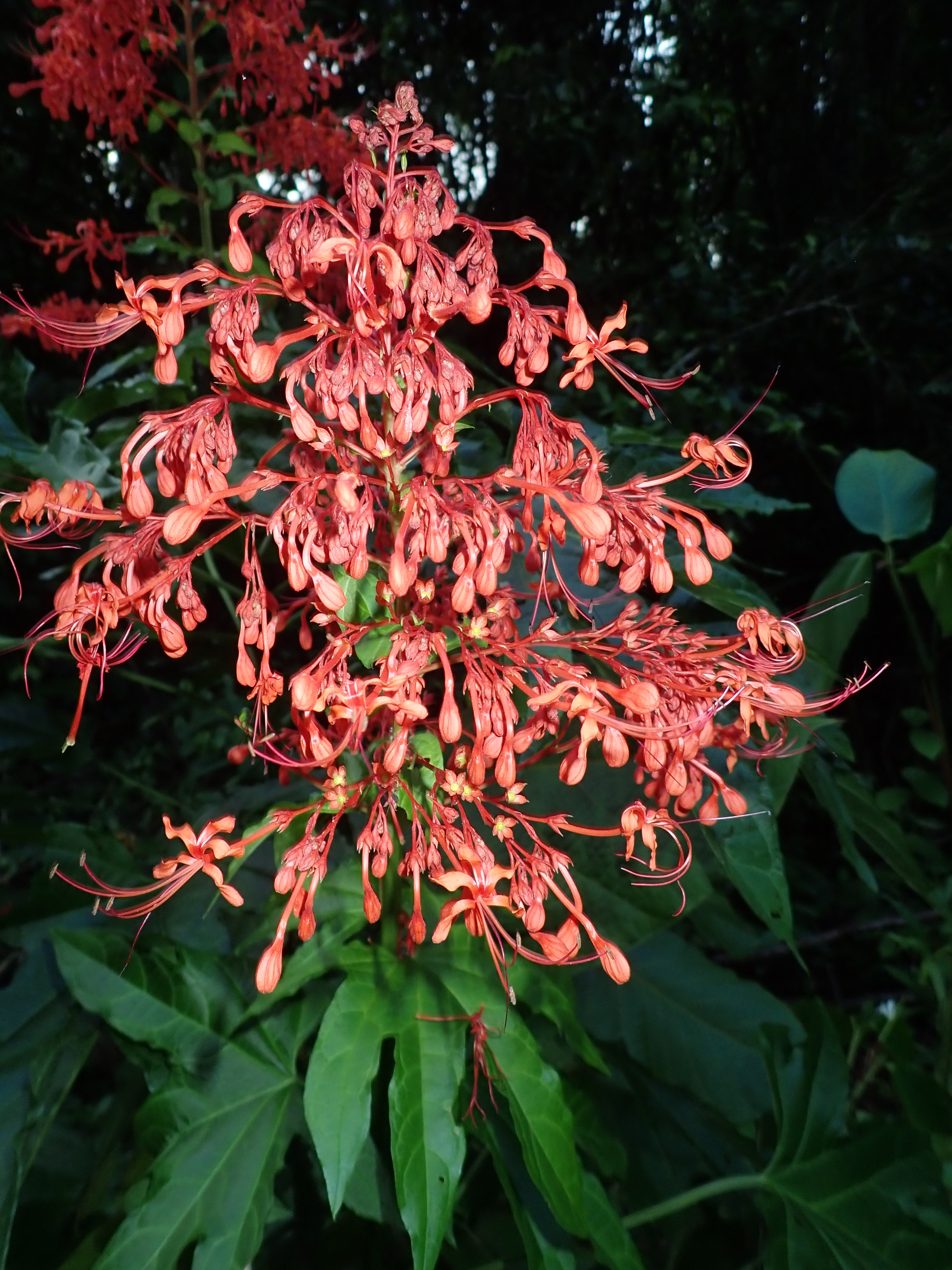
- Flower-head in Cát Tiên National Park

Scientific classification
- Kingdom: Plantae
- Clade: Tracheophytes
- Clade: Angiosperms
- Clade: Eudicots
- Clade: Asterids
- Order: Lamiales
- Family: Lamiaceae
- Subfamily: Ajugoideae
- Genus: Clerodendrum
- Species: C. palmatolobatum

Binomial name
- Clerodendrum palmatolobatum Dop, 1935

Synonyms
- Clerodendrum palmatilobatum P Dop.

= Clerodendrum palmatolobatum =

Species of flowering plant

Clerodendrum palmatolobatum is an Asian species of flowering plant in the family Lamiaceae. C. palmatolobatum is found in Cambodia and Vietnam, where it may be called ngọc nữ lá chân vịt: meaning [ngọc nữ = Clerodendrum] with leaves like duck's feet.

== Description ==
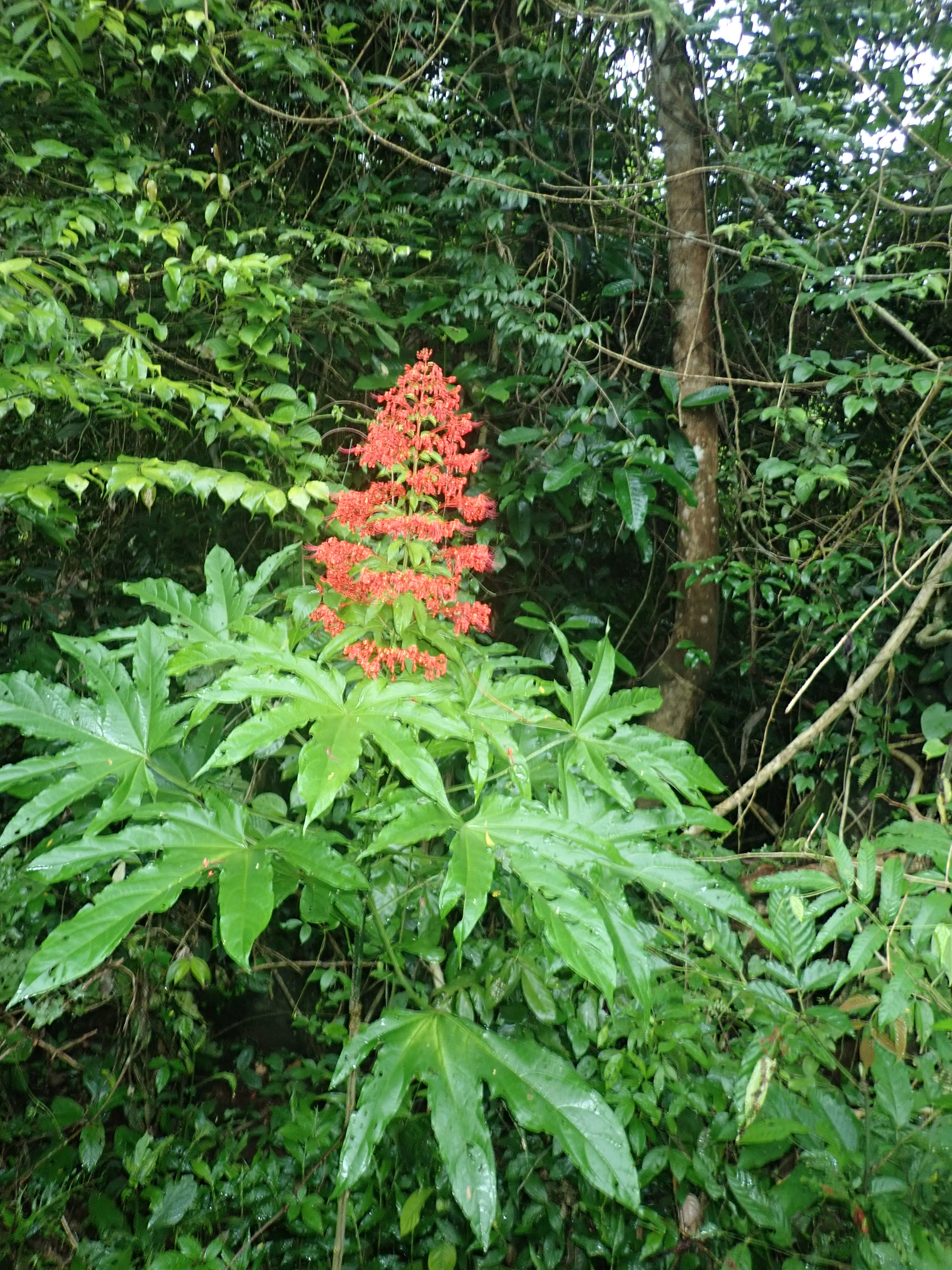
Whole plant: C. palmatolobatum

C. palmatolobatum is a shrub, growing up to 3 m tall, with bright red flowers. The overall appearance is similar to other "pagoda flowers" such as C. paniculatum, only with distinctive lobed, variable leaves that are approximately 130 x 100 mm with 5-7 lobes.
