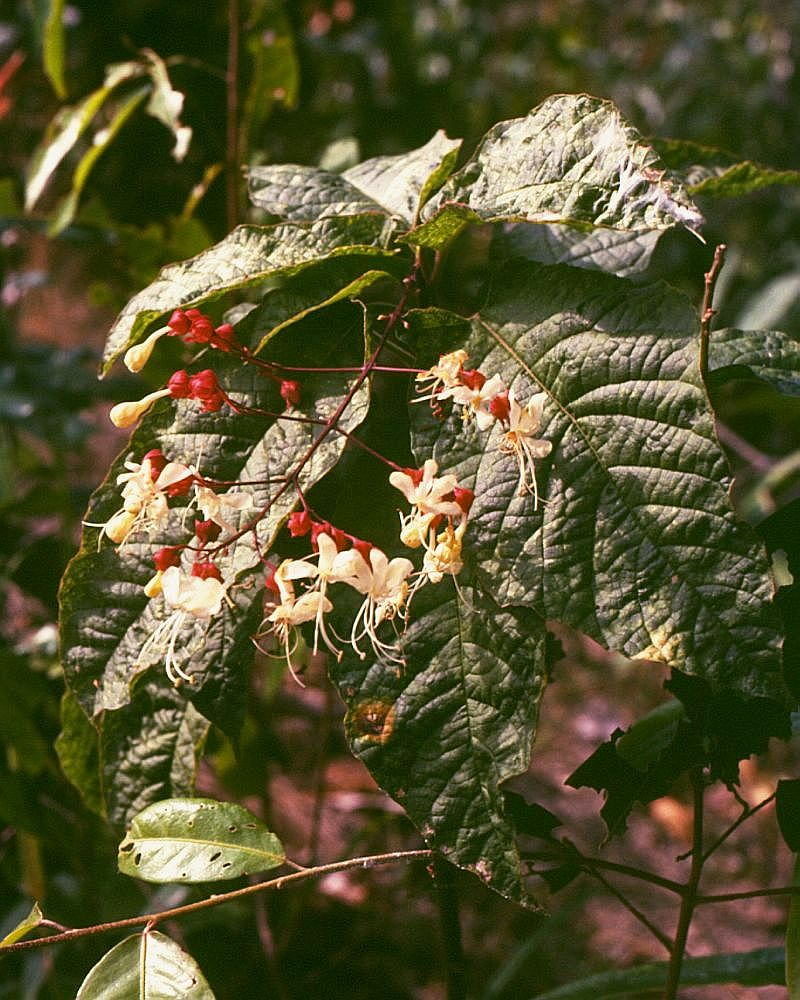

Scientific classification
- Kingdom: Plantae
- Clade: Tracheophytes
- Clade: Angiosperms
- Clade: Eudicots
- Clade: Asterids
- Order: Lamiales
- Family: Lamiaceae
- Genus: Clerodendrum
- Species: C. schmidtii

Binomial name
- Clerodendrum schmidtii C.B.Clarke, 1905

Synonyms
- Clerodendrum hastato-oblongum C.B.Clarke; Clerodendrum schmidtii var. glanduliferum Moldenke; Clerodendrum schmidtii var. macrophyllum Moldenke

= Clerodendrum schmidtii =

Species of flowering plant

Clerodendrum schmidtii, also called Chains-of-glory, is an Asian species of flowering plant in the family Lamiaceae. C. schmidtii is found throughout Indo-China; in Vietnam it may be called ngọc nữ Schmidt.
