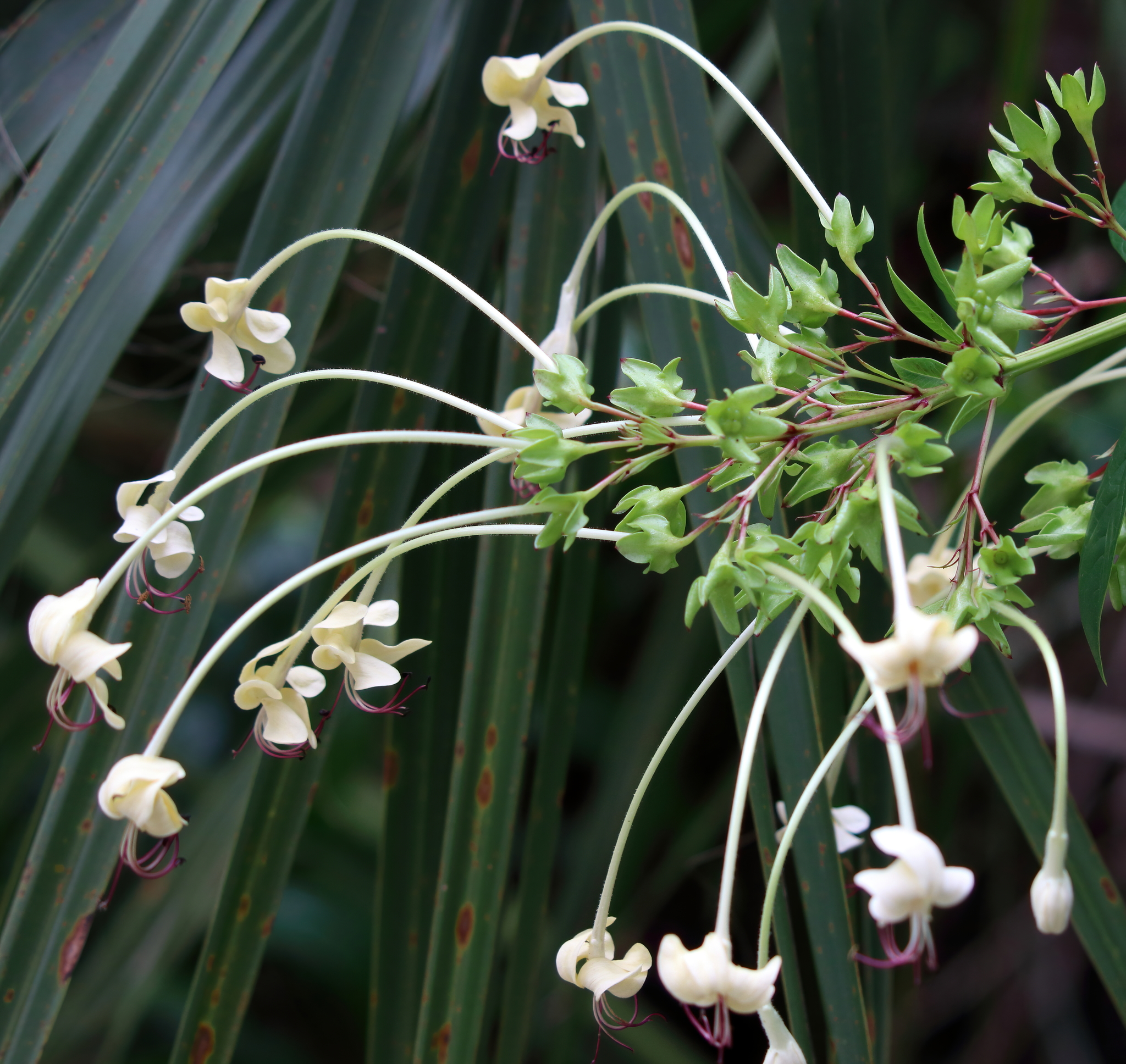
- Flowers
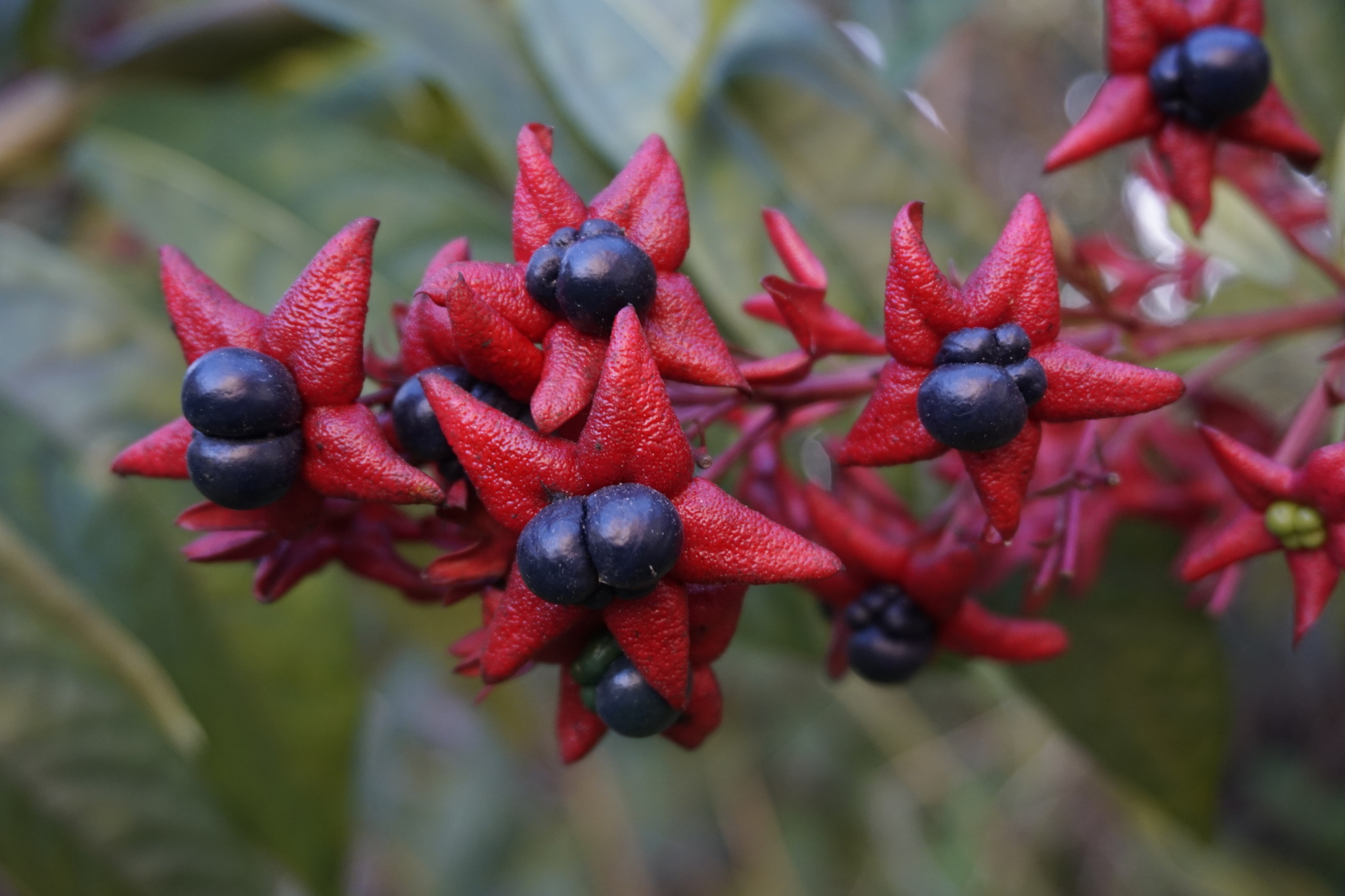
- Fruit

Scientific classification
- Kingdom: Plantae
- Clade: Tracheophytes
- Clade: Angiosperms
- Clade: Eudicots
- Clade: Asterids
- Order: Lamiales
- Family: Lamiaceae
- Genus: Clerodendrum
- Species: C. indicum

Binomial name
- Clerodendrum indicum (L.) Kuntze

= Clerodendrum indicum =

Species of flowering plant

Clerodendrum indicum, commonly known as Turk's turban, is a species of flowering plant in the mint family (Lamiaceae). It is a perennial shrub or subshrub native to tropical and subtropical parts of Asia.

== Taxonomy ==
Clerodendrum indicum was originally described under the basionym Siphonanthus indicus by Carl Linnaeus. The current combination was published by Otto Kuntze.

== Description ==
Clerodendrum indicum is a perennial plant that may grow as a shrub or subshrub. In cultivation and naturalized settings it can reach several metres in height. The species typically has whorled leaves and terminal inflorescences with long, tubular flowers; mature plants may produce drupaceous fruits.

== Ecology ==
Nectaries over the calyx secrete a thick, white, slimy substance which pools in the calyx-cup at the base of the corolla-tube. This may function as an ant barrier.

=== Pollination ===
The species has a unique pollination system. The flowers are open for 4 days. A little pollen is presented by the anthers on the first day, but most of the pollen is presented on the second day. On the third day, the stigma becomes receptive to pollen. Unusually, when the stigma becomes receptive to pollen, it mimics the appearance of an anther presenting its pollen to fool its pollinator into visiting it. While many insect species may visit the flower to feed on pollen and nectar, most only visit on the second day of a flower opening. Only a species of stingless bee is known to also visit the flower on its third day of opening, thereby delivering pollen to the stigma and pollinating the flower; this species of bee is thus this plant's only known pollinator. The study that determined this identified the bee as a species of Trigona, however, the study took part in India, and Trigona only occurs in the Neotropics.

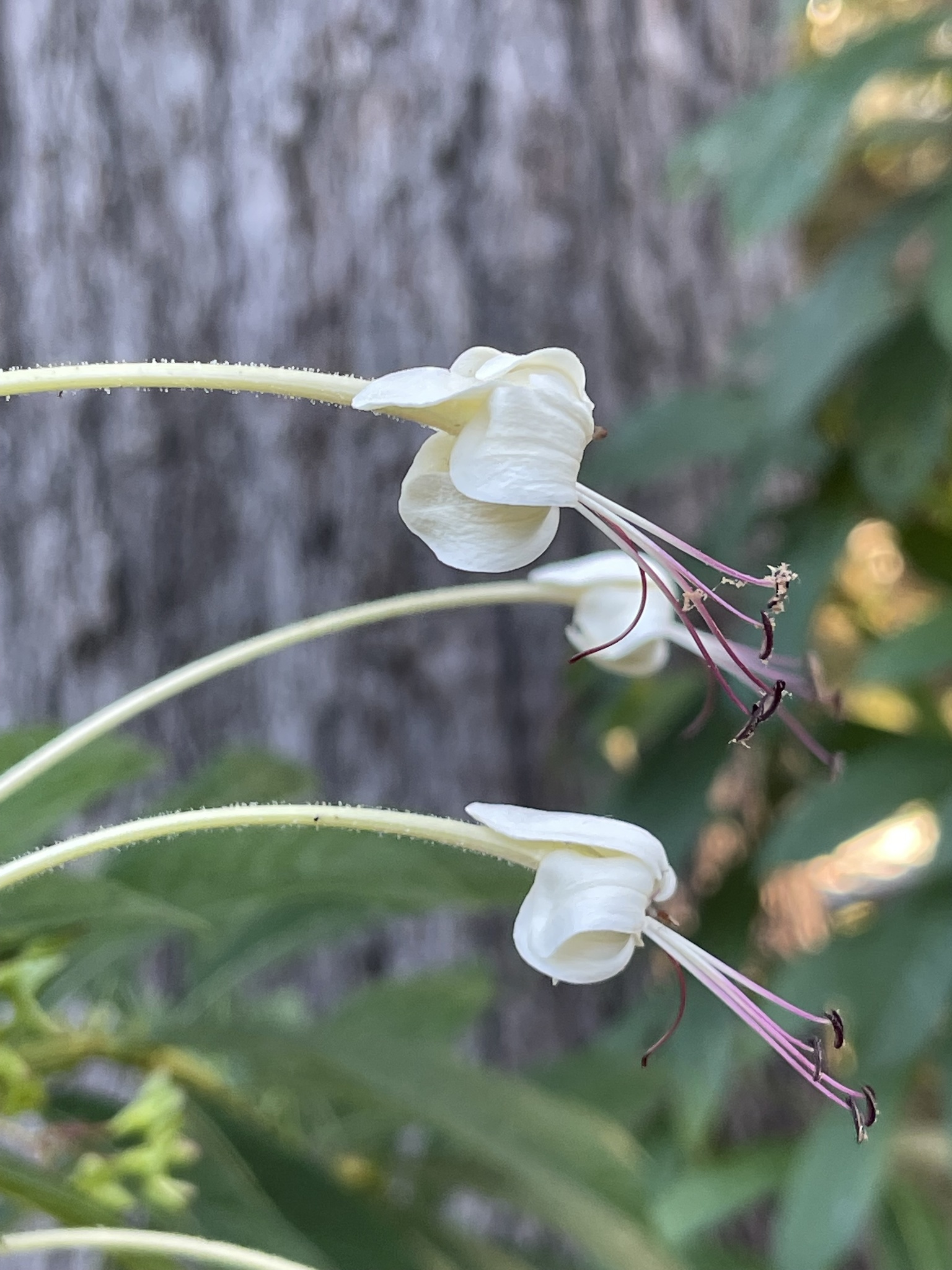
Day 2 flowers: anthers present pollen, while the non-receptive stigma curls downwards

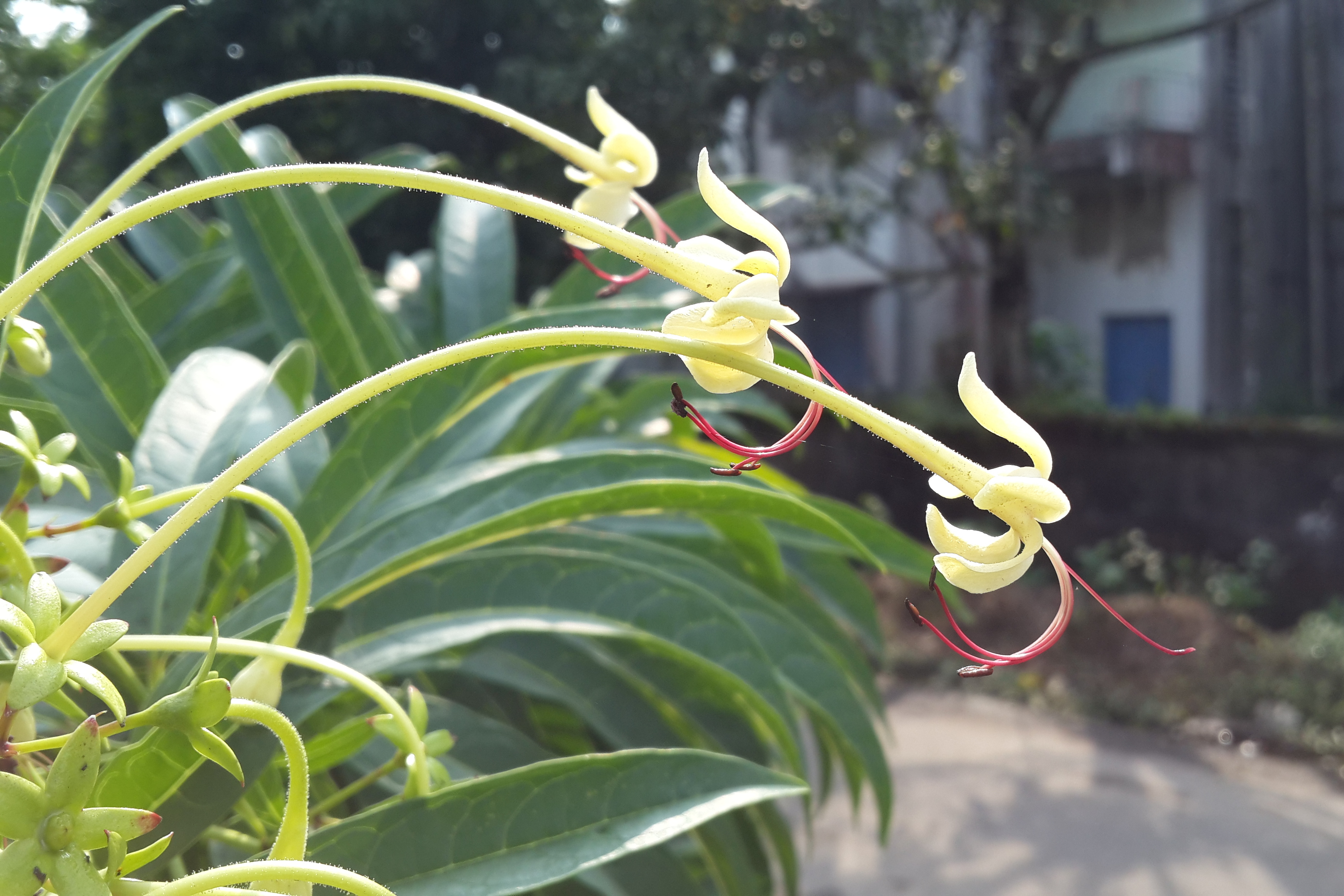
Day 3 flowers: the anthers are empty of pollen and curl downwards, while the stigma is straightened out and receptive to pollen

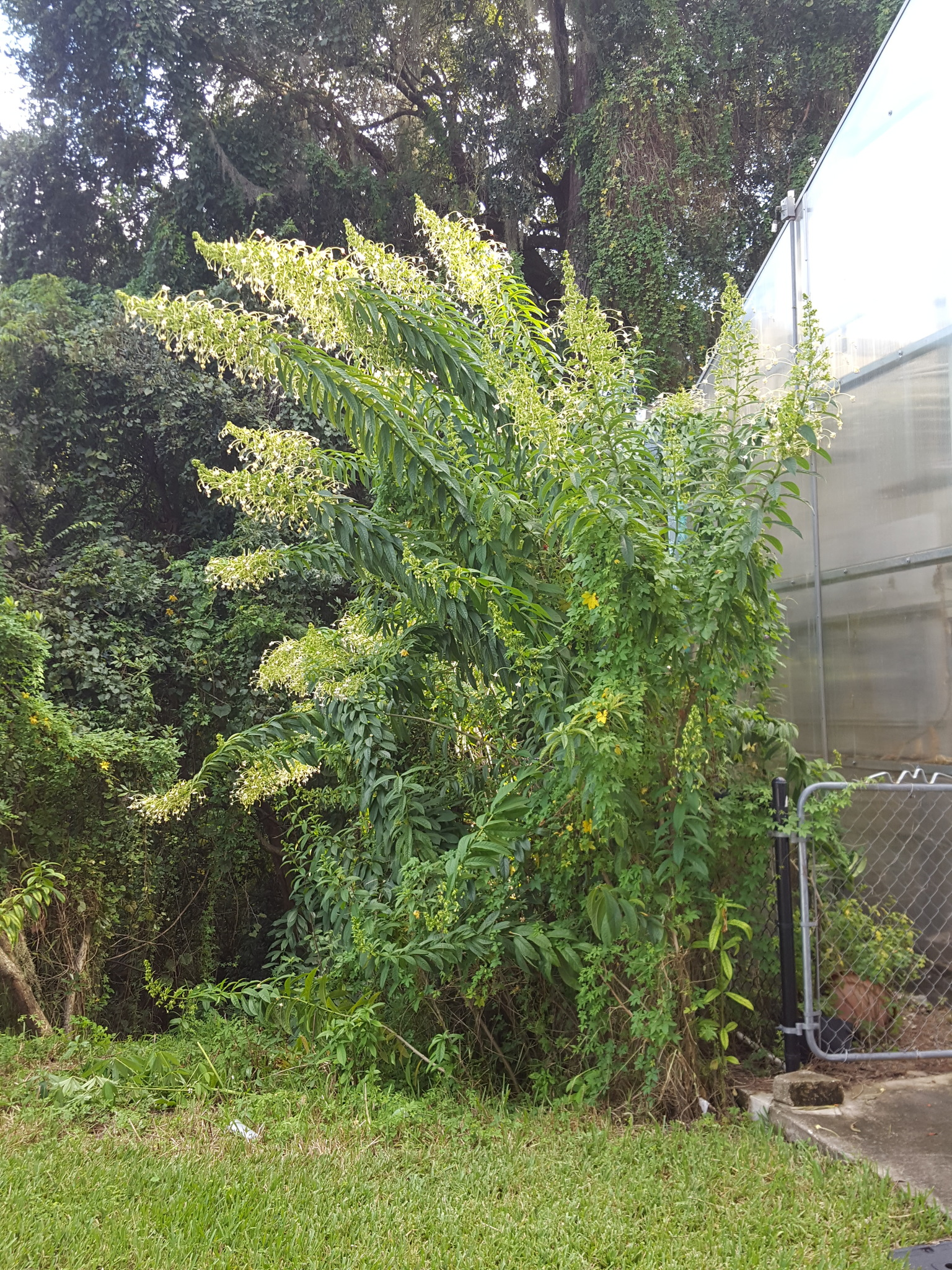
Showing size of the plant

The flower has nectar secreting nectaries, but its stingless bee pollinator does not feed from these. Rather, it appears that the nectar serves to lure non-pollinating insects away from the pollen-containing anthers.

This is the only known species of plant with bisexual flowers where the stigma mimics the anthers. Other plant species known to have anther-mimicking stigmas all have unisexual flowers.

== Uses ==
Clerodendrum indicum is sometimes cultivated as an ornamental plant in tropical and subtropical regions. In some areas where it has been introduced, it grows in disturbed or open habitats.

== Chemistry ==
Cleroindicin A is present in Clerodendrum indicum. It is the oxaspirane of rengyol.
