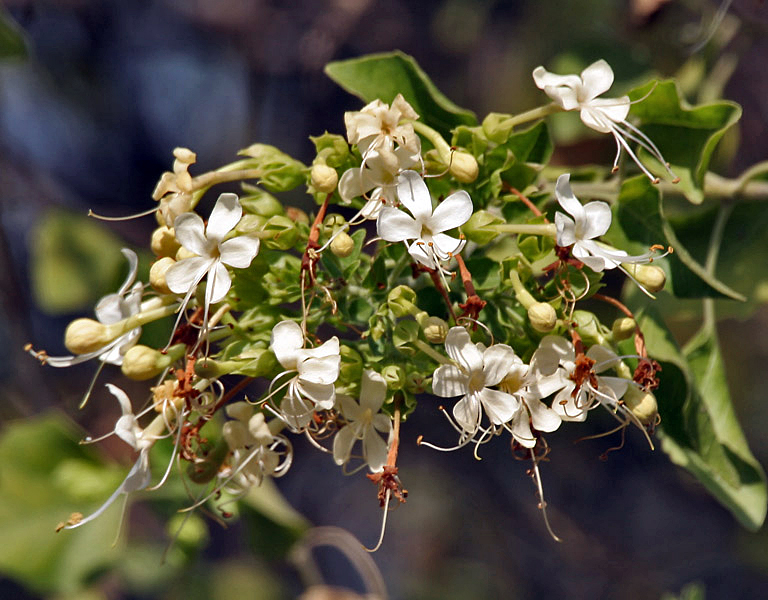

Conservation status
- Least Concern (IUCN 3.1)

Scientific classification
- Kingdom: Plantae
- Clade: Tracheophytes
- Clade: Angiosperms
- Clade: Eudicots
- Clade: Asterids
- Order: Lamiales
- Family: Lamiaceae
- Genus: Clerodendrum
- Species: C. phlomidis

Binomial name
- Clerodendrum phlomidis L.f.

Synonyms
- Volkameria multiflora Burm.f.

= Clerodendrum phlomidis =

Species of flowering plant

Clerodendrum phlomidis is a species of flowering plant in the family Lamiaceae. The plant has been used in Ayurvedic medicine, and some Ayurvedic sources refer to it by the synonym Clerodendrum multiflorum.

Clerodendrum phlomidis is a large shrub native to the Indian subcontinent and Myanmar. Clerodendrum myricoides from the same family is found in Africa and India.

== Description ==
Clerodendrum phlomidis has leaves which are ovate, opposite, deltoid, hairy from below and wavy. The flowers are in small rounded terminal panicle and bloom from August to February. The flowers are white or pinkish and are very fragrant.

== Usage ==
According to Indian ancient system of medicine Ayurveda, Dash Mool a very powerful combination of ten different roots to improve body vigor and maintain good health contains Clerodendrum phlomidis (Arni) Root. The pulp obtained from the crushing of the leaves is applied externally on swelling.
