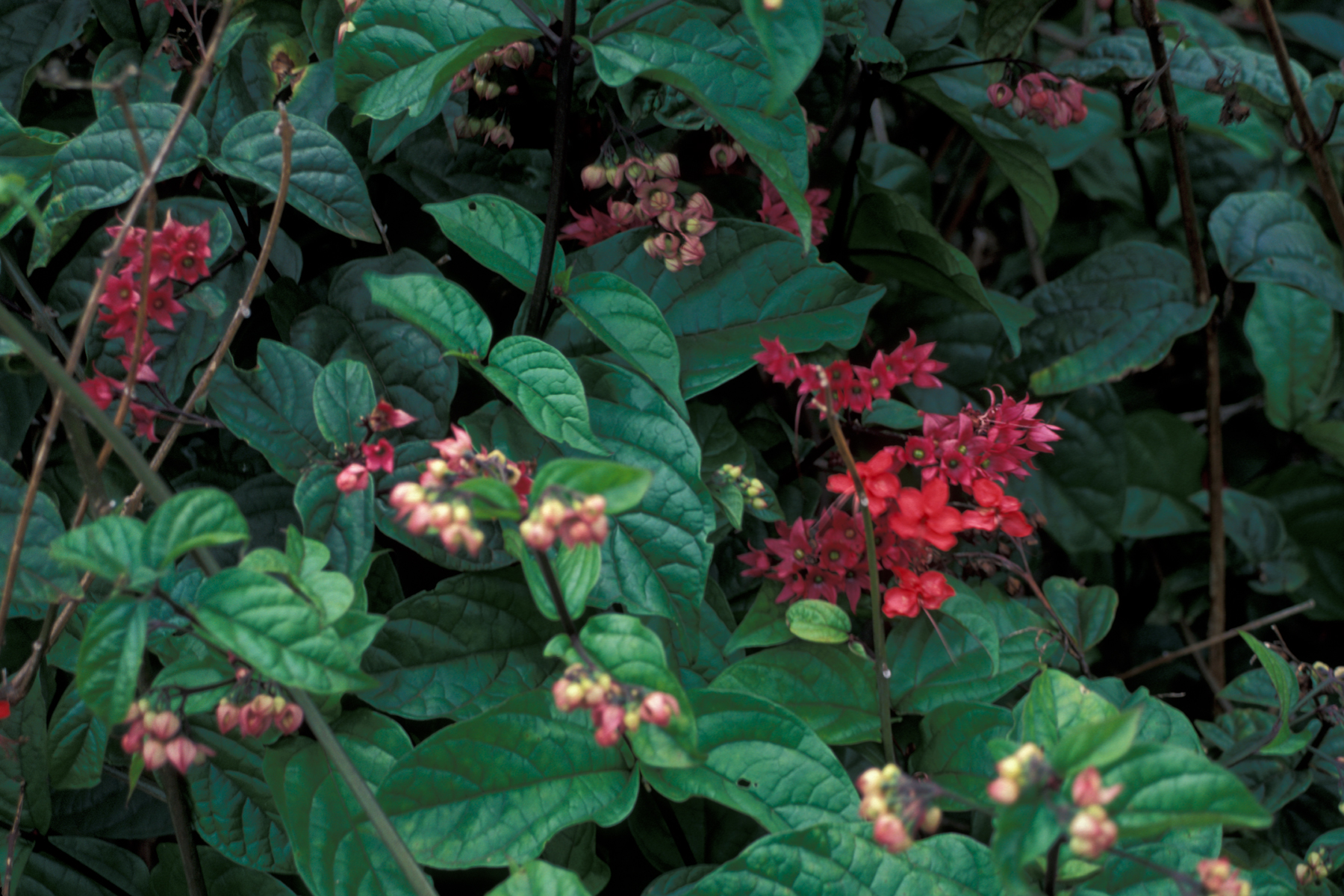

Scientific classification
- Kingdom: Plantae
- Clade: Tracheophytes
- Clade: Angiosperms
- Clade: Eudicots
- Clade: Asterids
- Order: Lamiales
- Family: Lamiaceae
- Genus: Clerodendrum
- Species: C. splendens

Binomial name
- Clerodendrum splendens G.Don

= Clerodendrum splendens =

Species of flowering plant

Clerodendrum splendens, the glory tree or flaming glorybower, is a species of flowering plant in the genus Clerodendrum of the family Lamiaceae, native to tropical Western Africa.

== Description ==
It is a twining evergreen climber, growing to 3 metres (9.8 ft) or more, with panicles of brilliant scarlet flowers in summer.

== Cultivation ==
With a minimum temperature of 10 °C (50 °F), it requires the protection of glass during the winter months in most temperate regions.

In cultivation this plant has gained the Royal Horticultural Society's Award of Garden Merit (confirmed 2017).
