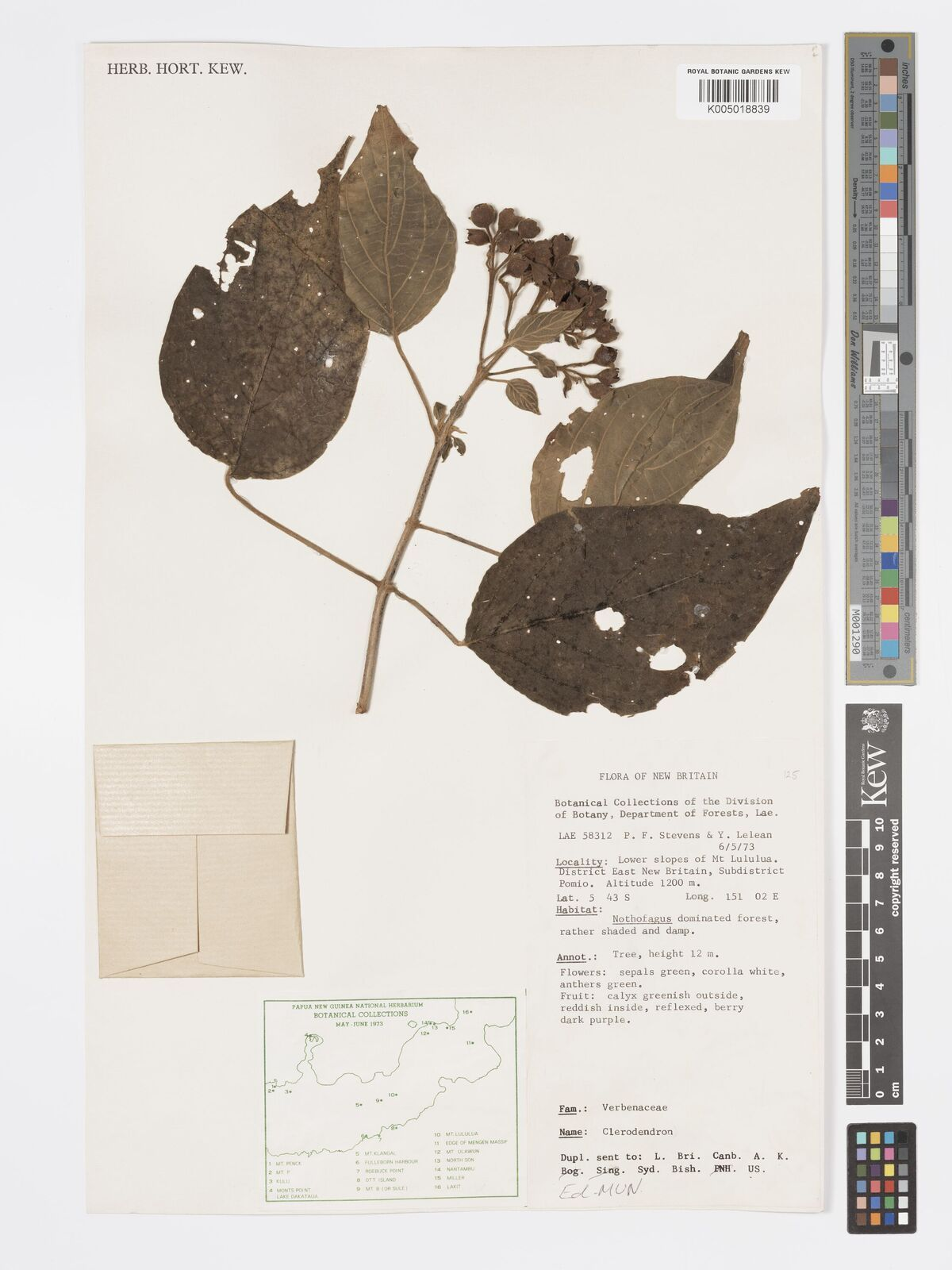

Scientific classification
- Kingdom: Plantae
- Clade: Tracheophytes
- Clade: Angiosperms
- Clade: Eudicots
- Clade: Asterids
- Order: Lamiales
- Family: Lamiaceae
- Genus: Clerodendrum
- Species: C. albiflos

Binomial name
- Clerodendrum albiflos H.J.Lam

Synonyms
- Clerodendrum albiflos var. glabrior H.J.Lam

= Clerodendrum albiflos =

Species of flowering plant

Clerodendrum albiflos is a species of flowering plant in the family Lamiaceae, native to Western New Guinea. It was first described in 1919 by the Dutch botanist Herman Johannes Lam in his monograph "Verbenaceae of the Malay Archipelago". The species is native to Western New Guinea, where it found in humid, lowland rainforests.

== Description ==
It is a small tree that grows up to 12 metres in height. The flowers possess green sepals and a white corolla, with green anthers. The fruit is a dark purple berry, enclosed in a calyx that is greenish on the outside and reddish on the inside.

== Varieties ==
Two taxa under Clerodendrum albiflos have been recorded from West Irian (Western New Guinea).

1. Clerodendrum albiflos H.J.Lam : The main species, native to Western New Guinea.
2. Clerodendrum albiflos var. glabrior (Gibbs) H.J.Lam : A recognized variety, also recorded from Western New Guinea.
