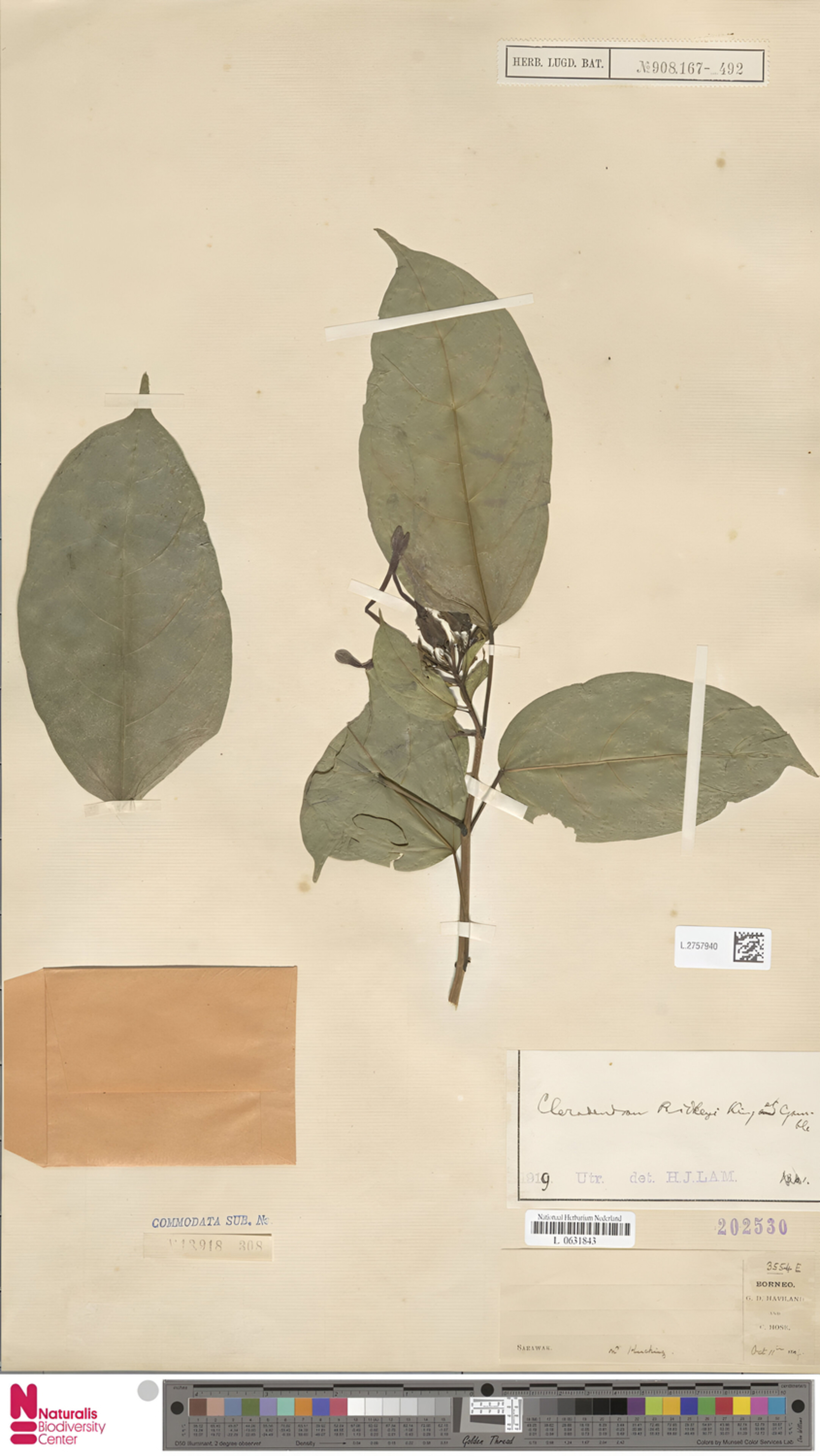
- Specimen of Clerodendrum ridleyi

Scientific classification
- Kingdom: Plantae
- Clade: Embryophytes
- Clade: Tracheophytes
- Clade: Spermatophytes
- Clade: Angiosperms
- Clade: Eudicots
- Clade: Asterids
- Order: Lamiales
- Family: Lamiaceae
- Genus: Clerodendrum
- Species: C. ridleyi

Binomial name
- Clerodendrum ridleyi King & Gamble

= Clerodendrum ridleyi =

Species of flowering plant

Clerodendrum ridleyi is a species of flowering plant in the family Lamiaceae. It was first described by King and Gamble in 1908. The species is native to western Malesia and occurs in wet tropical regions, where it grows as a shrub or small tree.

== Description ==
Clerodendrum ridleyi is a shrub or small tree that can grow up to 15 ft (4.6 m) tall, with smooth, pale-brown branches. Young branches are four-angled and glossy. Leaves are opposite, thin and soft, elliptic to ovate in shape, with a long-pointed apex and a rounded or wedge-shaped base; the margins are entire. The leaves measure 3–7 in (76–178 mm) long and 1–3 in (25–76 mm) in wide, are glabrous on both surfaces, and are paler on the lower surface. Petioles are 0.75–2 in (19–51 mm) long.

The flowers are borne in small terminal clusters up to 6 in (150 mm) long. They are white or pale yellow, with elongated buds. The calyx is deeply divided, with narrow and pointed lobes, and becomes enlarged and deep red in fruit. The corolla has a long, slender tube with short, rounded lobes. The stamens are long and project beyond the corolla. The ovary is smooth, and the style is very long.

The fruit is a deep red, round, fleshy drupe, about 0.5 in (13 mm) across, with 1 to 4 hard seeds. Seeds are thick and fleshy.
