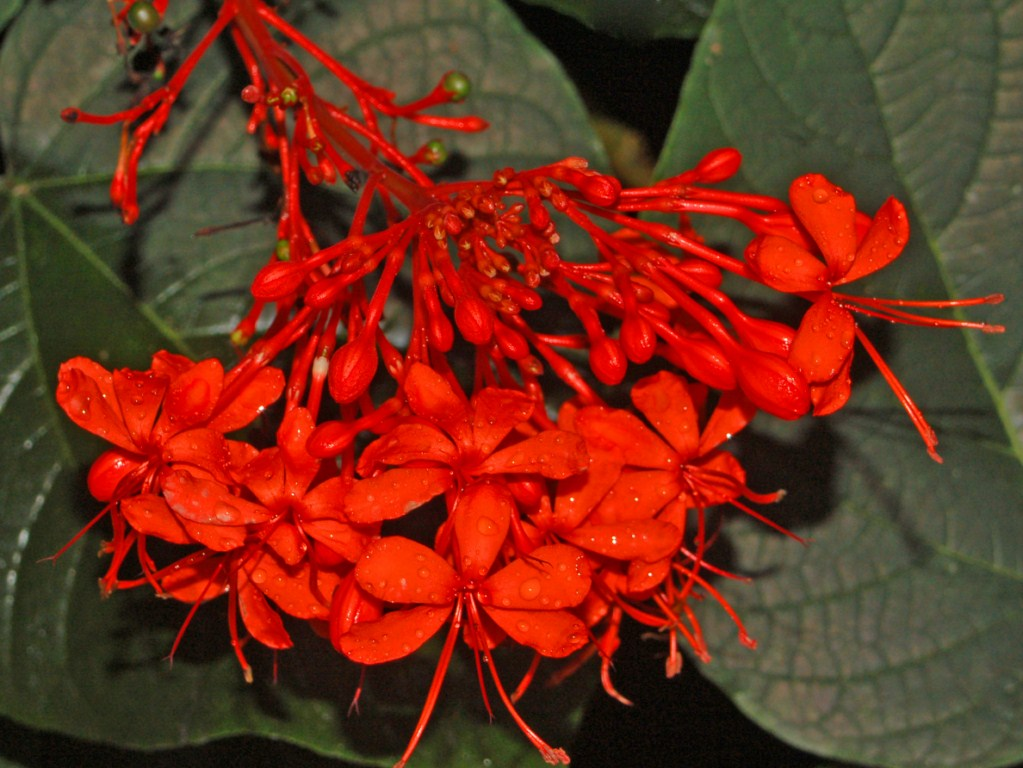
- Clerodendrum speciosissimum at Botanicka Zahrada Praha

Scientific classification
- Kingdom: Plantae
- Clade: Tracheophytes
- Clade: Angiosperms
- Clade: Eudicots
- Clade: Asterids
- Order: Lamiales
- Family: Lamiaceae
- Genus: Clerodendrum
- Species: C. speciosissimum

Binomial name
- Clerodendrum speciosissimum Drapiez

= Clerodendrum speciosissimum =

Species of flowering plant

Clerodendrum speciosissimum is a tropical shrub of the family Lamiaceae, native to Indonesia and Papuasia, but now naturalized in parts of Latin America, Africa, the Caribbean, Seychelles, and Florida.

== Description ==
The shrub can grow up to 4 m tall. The leaves are square-shaped, and the large heart-shaped flowers can reach up to 30 cm. It is cultivated as an ornamental plant, in particular for its bright red flowers.

== Gallery ==
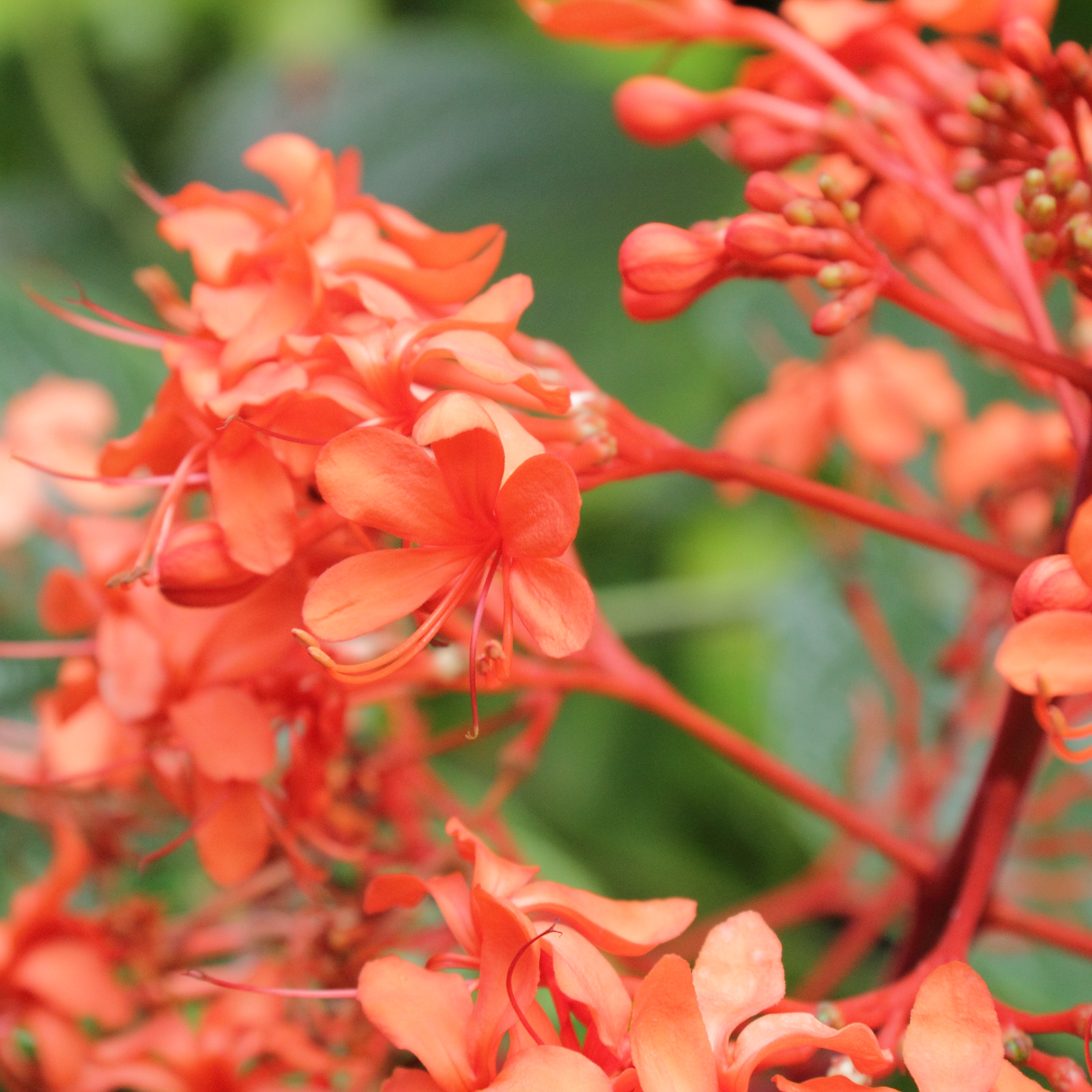
Close-up on flowers

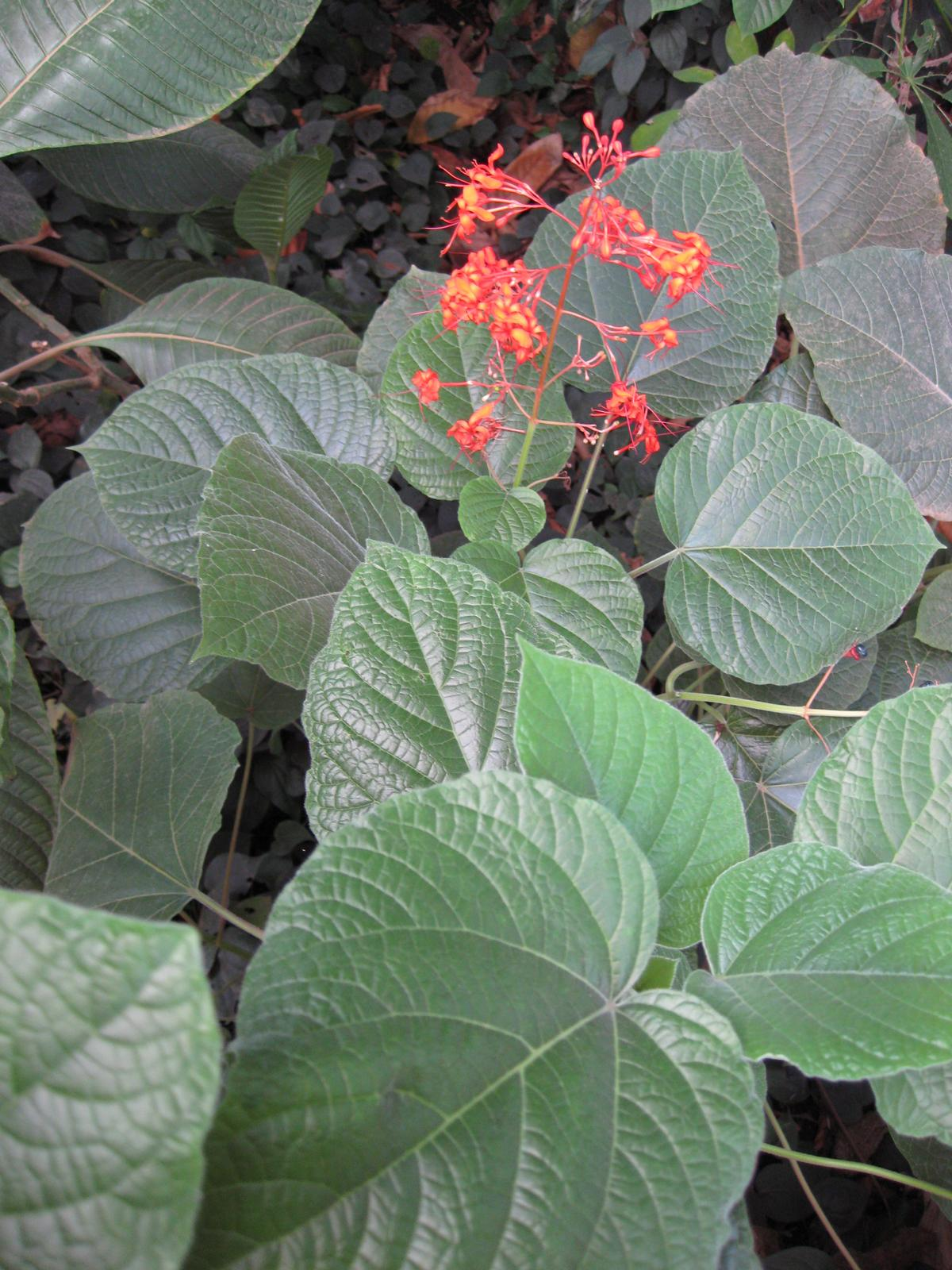
Leaves

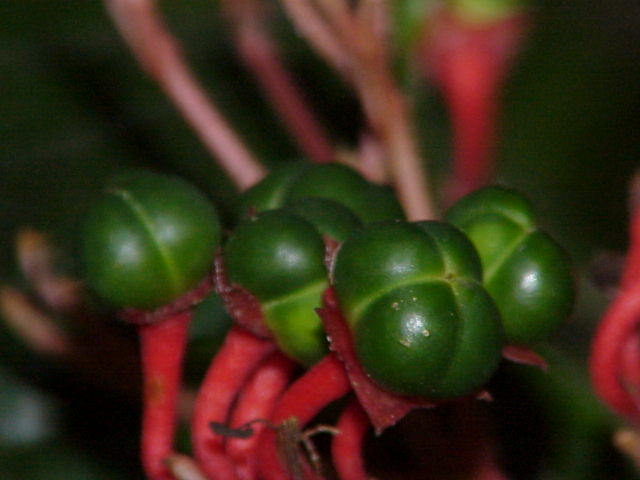
Fruits
