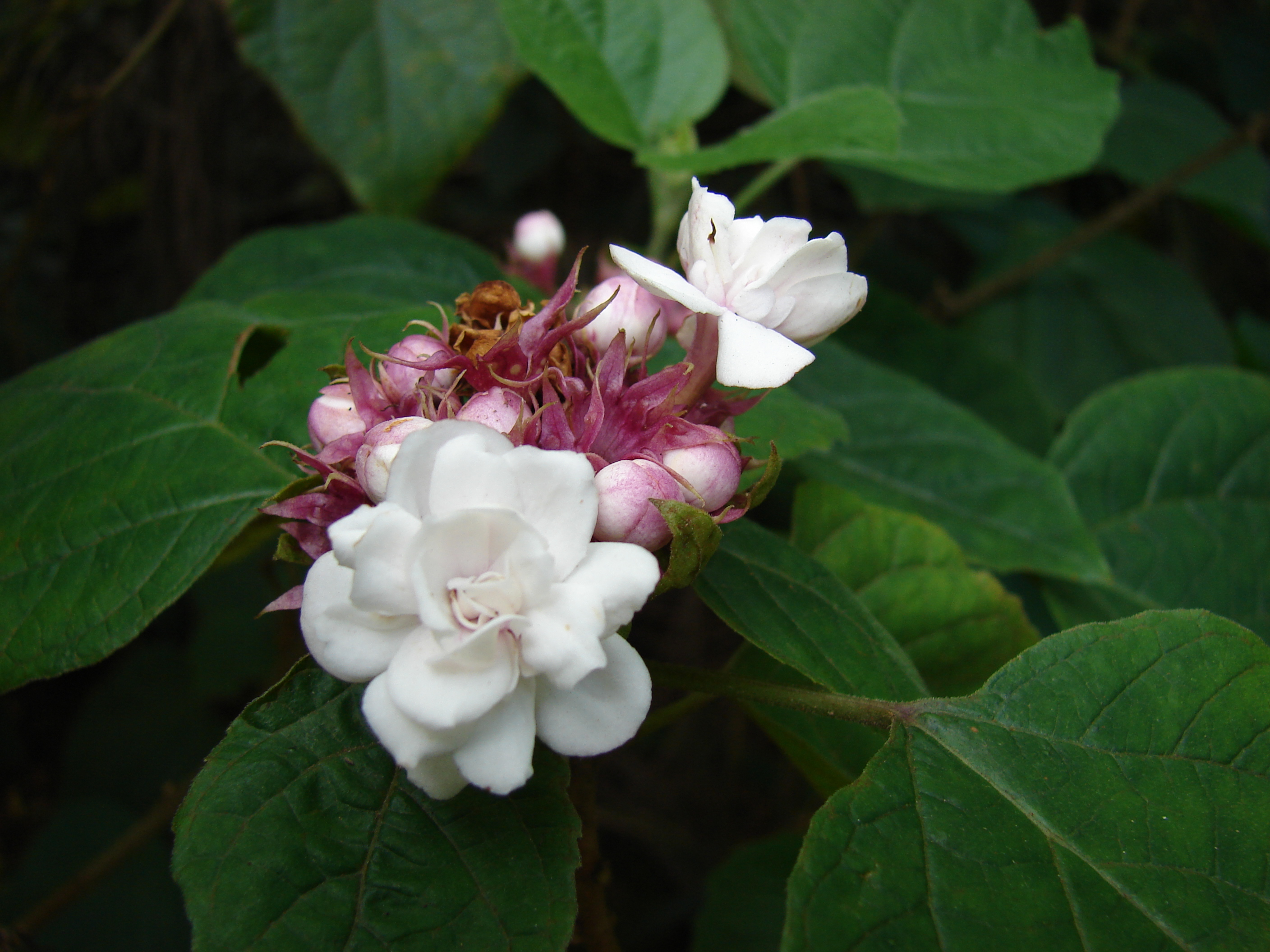
- Mature flowers and flower buds
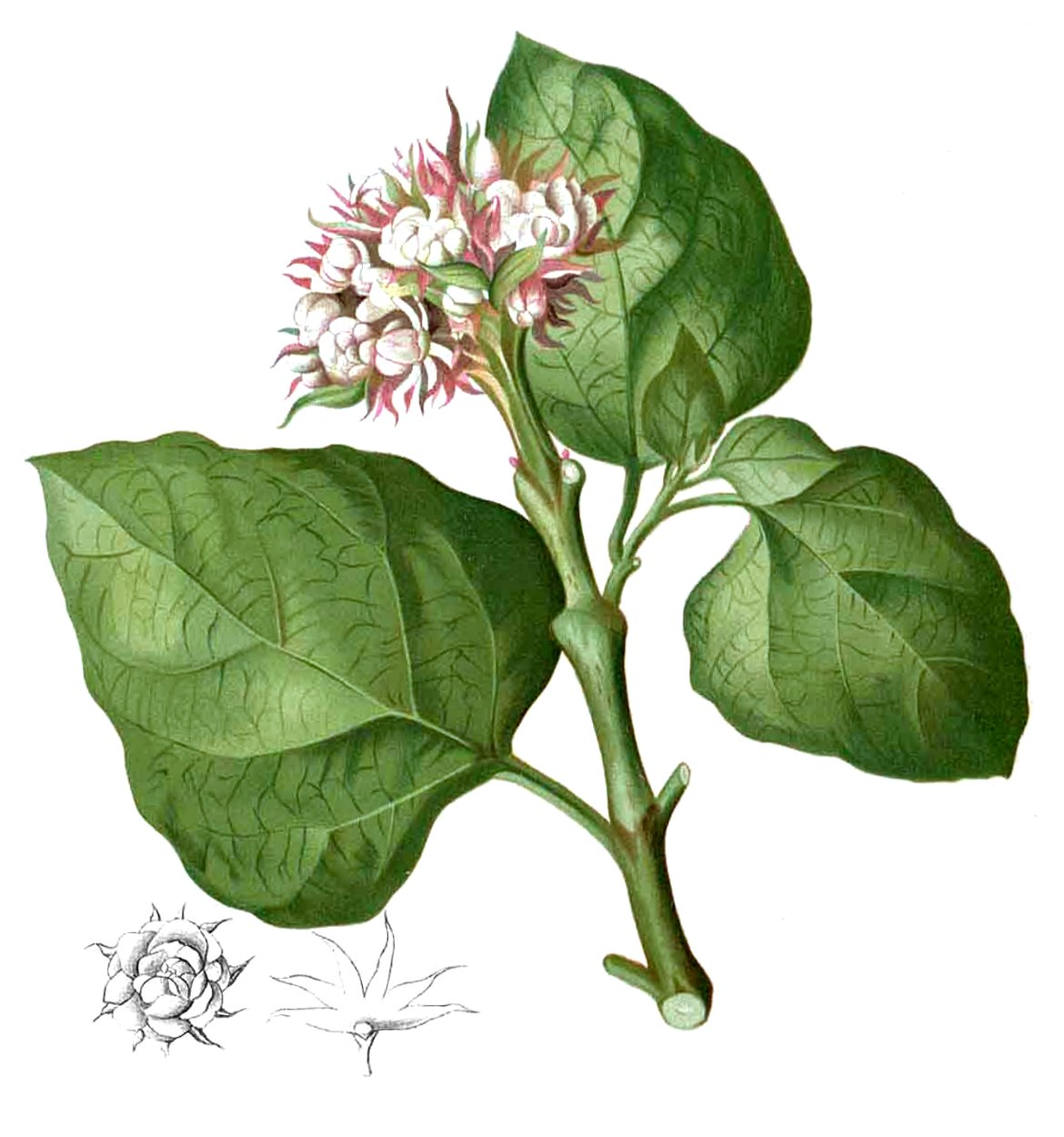
- Botanical illustration

Scientific classification
- Kingdom: Plantae
- Clade: Tracheophytes
- Clade: Angiosperms
- Clade: Eudicots
- Clade: Asterids
- Order: Lamiales
- Family: Lamiaceae
- Genus: Clerodendrum
- Species: C. chinense

Binomial name
- Clerodendrum chinense (Osbeck) Mabb.

Synonyms
- List: Agricolaea fragrans (Vent.) Schrank; Clerodendrum chinense var. hamrense Das, Sarma & Borthakur; Clerodendrum chinense var. parviflorum M.R.Almeida; Clerodendrum chinense var. plenum M.R.Almeida; Clerodendrum chinense var. simplex (Moldenke) S.L.Chen; Clerodendrum fragrans Willd.; Clerodendrum fragrans f. pleniflorum (Schauer) Standl. & Steyerm.; Clerodendrum fragrans var. pleniflorum Schauer; Clerodendrum japonicum (Jacq.) Gandhi; Clerodendrum lasiocephalum C.B.Clarke; Clerodendrum macradenium Miq.; Clerodendrum philippinum Schauer; Clerodendrum philippinum f. multiplex (Sweet) Moldenke; Clerodendrum philippinum f. pleniflorum (Schauer) Moldenke; Clerodendrum philippinum var. simplex C.Y.Wu & R.C.Fang; Clerodendrum philippinum f. subfertile Moldenke; Clerodendrum riedelii Oliv.; Clerodendrum roseum Poit.; Cryptanthus chinensis Osbeck; Ovieda fragrans (Vent.) Hitchc.; Volkameria fragrans Vent.; Volkmannia japonica Jacq.

= Clerodendrum chinense =

Species of flowering plant

Clerodendrum chinense, called the glory bower, is a species of flowering plant in the genus Clerodendrum. It is native to Nepal, the eastern Himalayas, Assam, the Andaman and Nicobar Islands, south-central and southeast China, Southeast Asia, and Malesia. It is a perennial shrub that grows up to 3 m (10 ft) tall.

A popular garden plant, it has been widely introduced to the rest of the world, including Florida, the Caribbean, Bermuda, Central America, the Galápagos, South America, Ascension Island, the Gulf of Guinea islands, East Africa, the Seychelles, Pakistan, India, the Lesser Sunda Islands, Taiwan, the Cook Islands, Fiji, Niue, and the Society Islands. It has gained the Royal Horticultural Society's Award of Garden Merit.
