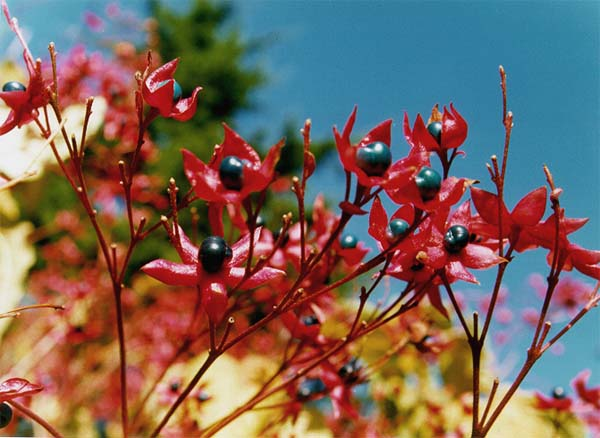
- Clerodendrum trichotomum fruit

Scientific classification
- Kingdom: Plantae
- Clade: Tracheophytes
- Clade: Angiosperms
- Clade: Eudicots
- Clade: Asterids
- Order: Lamiales
- Family: Lamiaceae
- Subfamily: Ajugoideae
- Genus: Clerodendrum; L.

Type species
- Clerodendrum infortunatum L.

Species
- See text

Synonyms
- Adelosa Blume; Archboldia E.Beer & H.J.Lam; Siphoboea Baill. Siphonanthus L. Spironema Hochst.

= Clerodendrum =

Genus of flowering plants

Clerodendrum is a genus of flowering plants formerly placed in the family Verbenaceae, but now considered to belong to the Lamiaceae (mint) family. Its common names include glorybower, bagflower, pagoda flower and bleeding-heart. It is currently classified in the subfamily Ajugoideae, being one of several genera transferred from Verbenaceae to Lamiaceae in the 1990s, based on phylogenetic analysis of morphological and molecular data.

Estimates of the number of species in Clerodendrum vary widely, from about 150 to about 450. This is partly because about 30 species have been transferred to Rotheca, about 30 more to Volkameria, and 1 to Ovieda. The type species for the genus is Clerodendrum infortunatum. It is native to Sri Lanka and the Andaman Islands.

The genus is native to tropical and warm temperate regions of the world, with most of the species occurring in tropical Africa and southern Asia, but with a few in the tropical Americas and northern Australasia, and a few extending north into the temperate zone in eastern Asia.

They are shrubs, lianas, and small trees, usually growing to 1–12 m (3 ft 3 in – 39 ft 4 in) tall, with opposite or whorled leaves. C. floribundum can grow to 30 m (98 ft) tall. Clerodendrum fistulosum and Clerodendrum myrmecophila have hollow stems that are inhabited by ants. Clerodendrum trichotomum is a common ornamental in warmer parts of the world. Eight other species are also grown in the tropics for their abundant and attractive flowers. One of these, Clerodendrum macrostegium, suckers abundantly from the roots, often producing a thicket within a few years.

The following species are cultivated in the UK:

- C. chinense
- C. splendens
- C. thomsoniae
- C. trichotomum

Clerodendrum species are used as food plants by the larvae of some Lepidoptera species including Endoclita malabaricus and Endoclita sericeus. Both butterflies and hummingbirds are often attracted to blooming clerodendrum.

== Description ==
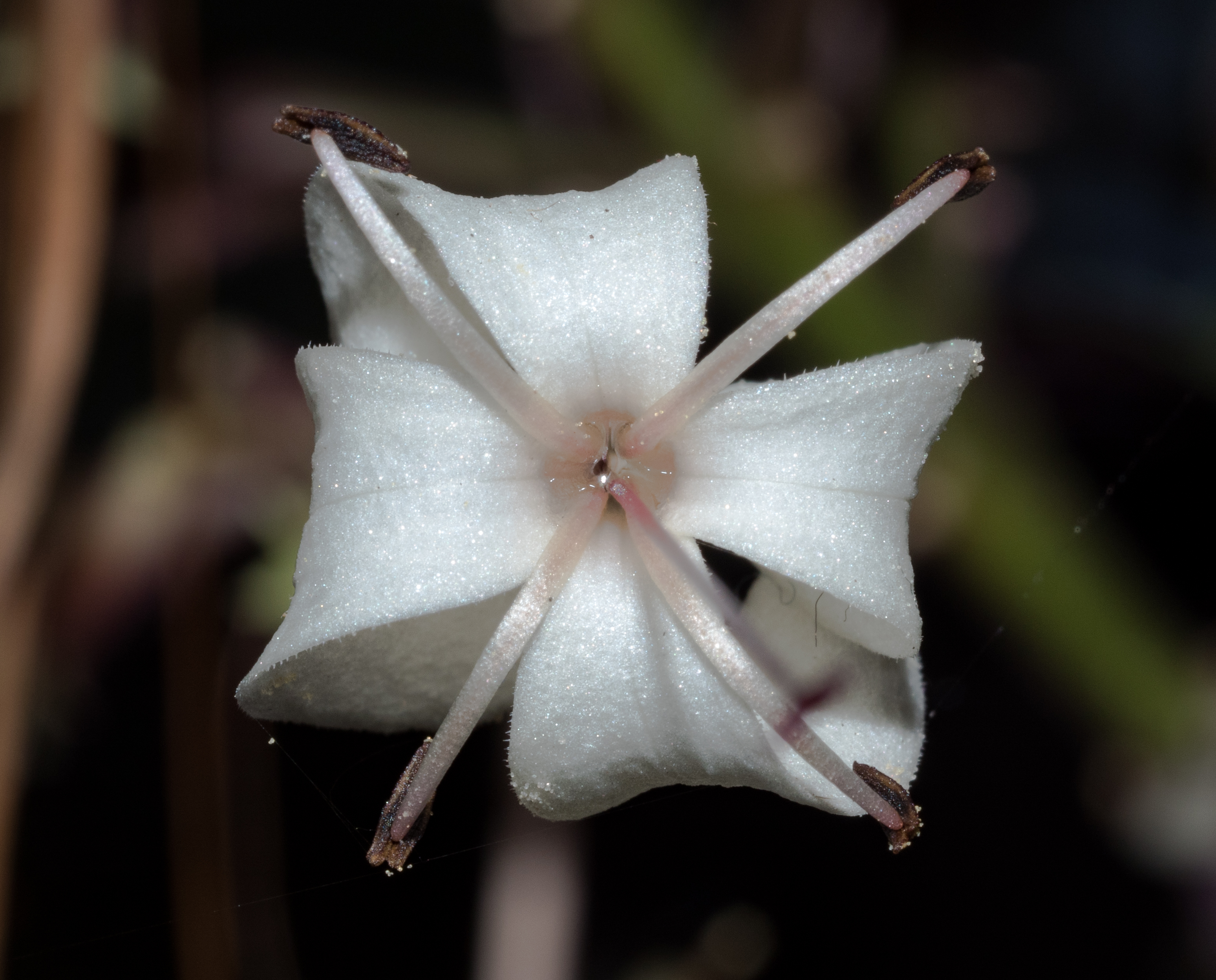
Close-up of a C. quadriloculare flower

The following description is based on the one by Yuan et alii (2010) and applies to only the monophyletic circumscription of Clerodendrum.

Clerodendrum is a genus of small trees, shrubs, lianas, and subherbaceous perennials. Leaves decussate or whorled, never spiny as in some close relatives.

Inflorescence usually terminal. Sepals usually connate, often colored, usually accrescent. Corolla red to yellow, pink, or white. Corolla tube 5-lobed, the lobes usually unequal.

Stamens 4 (rarely 5), usually in 2 pairs of unequal length and projecting well beyond the mouth of the corolla.

Ovary incompletely 4-locular. Ovules 4. Style terminal on the ovary, bifid.

Fruit a drupe, usually with 4 grooves or lobes, 4-seeded (rarely 2-seeded by abortion).

== Pollination ==
Clerodendrum and its relatives have an unusual pollination syndrome which avoids self-pollination. This mating system combines dichogamy and herkogamy.

The flowers are protandrous. When the flower opens, the stamens stand erect, parallel to the central axis of the flower, while the style bends over, holding the stigma beyond the rim of the corolla. After the pollen is shed, the stamens curl up or bend over, and the style straightens out, bringing the stigma to the center of the flower. Except for Aegiphila, which is heterostylous, this breeding strategy is shared by all members of the clade consisting of Kalaharia, Clerodendrum, Volkameria, Aegiphila, Ovieda, Tetraclea, and Amasonia.

== History ==
Clerodendrum was named by Linnaeus in Species Plantarum in 1753. The name is derived from two Greek words, kleros, meaning "chance or fate" or "clergy", and dendron, "a tree". It refers to the considerable variation in reports of the usefulness of Clerodendrum in medicine, and also to the fact the trees were used for religious purposes in Asia.

Regional revisions of Clerodendrum have been done for local floras, but the last monograph of the entire genus was by John Isaac Briquet in 1895. He recognized about 90 species, defining the genus broadly to include species that others had placed in Rotheca, Volkameria, and Ovieda. His circumscription was followed by most authors for the next 100 years, even though it was widely believed to be problematic.

In 1997, phylogenetic analysis of DNA data showed that Clerodendrum, as then understood, was polyphyletic. This situation was remedied in 1998 with the revival of Rotheca. This taxonomic change was based on previous work and on a molecular phylogenetic study that was not published until the following year.

In 2004, a study of DNA sequences showed that the monospecific Australian genus Huxleya was embedded in a clade of Clerodendrum species that had formerly been placed in Volkameria. Huxleya was then sunk into synonymy with Clerodendrum. The 2004 study sampled Aegiphila, Tetraclea, and Amasonia, three New World genera of Ajugoideae that had not previously been sampled for DNA. The results of this study cast doubt, once again, upon the monophyly of Clerodendrum.

In 2010, a study of four chloroplast DNA intergenic spacers showed that part of Clerodendrum was closer to the New world genera than to other Clerodendrum, and that one species of Clerodendrum was nested within the clade of New World genera. The authors of this study resurrected the genus Volkameria and assigned to it about 30 species that had been in Clerodendrum. They also resurrected Ovieda as a monotypic genus consisting of Ovieda spinosa. Volkameria and Ovieda had been erected by Linnaeus in 1753. Modern cladistic analysis has largely vindicated his concepts of Clerodendrum and its relatives.

== Traditional medicinal use ==
Clerodendrum glandulosum. Coleb leaf aqueous extract is traditionally used by people of North-East India to alleviate symptoms of diabetes, obesity and hypertension.

Among the Hmar and Zomi tribes in the North East India Anphui(Clerodendrum) is also being used as a dish/curry.

== Systematics ==
Clerodendrum is strongly supported as monophyletic in molecular phylogenetic analyses. It consists of two clades, each of which receives strong bootstrap support. One clade contains mostly African species. The other is mostly Asian. The African and Asian groups can not confidently be divided into sections without more extensive sampling of taxa in phylogenetic studies. The Madagascan species, in particular, are poorly studied.

It appears that the long, narrow corolla tube evolved only once in Clerodendrum, and appeared again, among its relatives, in Ovieda.

=== Species ===
As of May 2025 Plants of the World Online recognises 240 species within this genus, as follows:

- Clerodendrum abilioi R.Fern.
- Clerodendrum adenocalyx Dop ex Satthaphorn
- Clerodendrum adenophysum Hallier f.
- Clerodendrum africanum Moldenke
- Clerodendrum albiflos H.J.Lam
- Clerodendrum alboviolaceum Moldenke
- Clerodendrum andamanense (Moldenke) A.Rajendran & P.Daniel
- Clerodendrum angustipetalum Satthaphorn, A.J.Paton & Leerat.
- Clerodendrum anomalum Letouzey
- Clerodendrum apayaoense Quisumb.
- Clerodendrum arenarium Baker
- Clerodendrum atlanticum Jongkind
- Clerodendrum aucubifolium Hemsl.
- Clerodendrum barba-felis Hallier f.
- Clerodendrum baronianum Oliv.
- Clerodendrum baumii Gürke
- Clerodendrum bellum Moldenke
- Clerodendrum bipindense Gürke
- Clerodendrum boivinii Moldenke
- Clerodendrum bosseri Capuron
- Clerodendrum brachyanthum Schauer
- Clerodendrum brachystemon C.Y.Wu & R.C.Fang
- Clerodendrum bracteatum Wall. ex Walp.
- Clerodendrum brassii Beer & H.J.Lam
- Clerodendrum brunfelsiiflorum Hallier f.
- Clerodendrum brunnescens Moldenke
- Clerodendrum brunsvigioides Baker
- Clerodendrum buchananii (Roxb.) Walp.
- Clerodendrum buchneri Gürke
- Clerodendrum buettneri Gürke
- Clerodendrum bungei Steud.
- Clerodendrum calamitosum L.
- Clerodendrum canescens Wall. ex Walp.
- Clerodendrum capitatum (Willd.) Schumach.
- Clerodendrum caryopteroides Moldenke
- Clerodendrum cauliflorum Vatke
- Clerodendrum cecil-fischeri A.Rajendran & P.Daniel
- Clerodendrum cephalanthum Oliv.
- Clerodendrum chamaeriphes Wernham
- Clerodendrum chartaceum Moldenke
- Clerodendrum chinense (Osbeck) Mabb.
- Clerodendrum chlorisepalum Merr. ex Moldenke
- Clerodendrum cochinchinense Dop
- Clerodendrum colebrookeanum Walp.
- Clerodendrum comans Moldenke
- Clerodendrum confine S.L.Chen & T.D.Zhuang
- Clerodendrum costatum R.Br.
- Clerodendrum cyrtophyllum Turcz.
- Clerodendrum dauphinense Moldenke
- Clerodendrum decaryi Moldenke
- Clerodendrum deflexum Wall.
- Clerodendrum dembianense Chiov.
- Clerodendrum densiflorum Griff.
- Clerodendrum dependens Aug.DC.
- Clerodendrum dewittei Moldenke
- Clerodendrum dinklagei Gürke
- Clerodendrum disparifolium Blume
- Clerodendrum dusenii Gürke
- Clerodendrum ekmanii Moldenke
- Clerodendrum elbertii Hallier f.
- Clerodendrum elliotii Moldenke
- Clerodendrum emirnense Bojer ex Hook.
- Clerodendrum ervatamioides C.Y.Wu
- Clerodendrum eucalycinum Oliv.
- Clerodendrum eupatorioides Baker
- Clerodendrum excavatum De Wild.
- Clerodendrum farafanganense Moldenke
- Clerodendrum fasciculatum B.Thomas
- Clerodendrum filipes Moldenke
- Clerodendrum finetii Dop
- Clerodendrum fistulosum Becc.
- Clerodendrum floribundum R.Br.
- Clerodendrum formicarum Gürke
- Clerodendrum fortunatum L.
- Clerodendrum frutectorum S.Moore
- Clerodendrum fugitans Wernham
- Clerodendrum fuscum Gürke
- Clerodendrum galeatum Balf.f.
- Clerodendrum garrettianum Craib
- Clerodendrum gaudichaudii Dop
- Clerodendrum geoffrayi Dop
- Clerodendrum gibbosum Moldenke
- Clerodendrum giganteum (Moldenke) Phillipson & Callm.
- Clerodendrum globosum Moldenke
- Clerodendrum godefroyi Kuntze
- Clerodendrum grayi Munir
- Clerodendrum grevei Moldenke
- Clerodendrum griffithianum C.B.Clarke
- Clerodendrum haematolasium Hallier f.
- Clerodendrum hahnianum Dop
- Clerodendrum hainanense Hand.-Mazz.
- Clerodendrum harmandianum Dop
- Clerodendrum hastatum Lindl.
- Clerodendrum hendersonii Moldenke
- Clerodendrum hettae Hallier f.
- Clerodendrum hexangulatum B.Thomas
- Clerodendrum hildebrandtii Vatke
- Clerodendrum hircinum Schauer
- Clerodendrum hiulcum Moldenke
- Clerodendrum humbertii Moldenke
- Clerodendrum inaequipetiolatum R.D.Good
- Clerodendrum indicum (L.) Kuntze
- Clerodendrum infortunatum L.
- Clerodendrum insolitum Moldenke
- Clerodendrum intermedium Cham.
- Clerodendrum involucratum Vatke
- Clerodendrum izuinsulare K.Inoue & M.Haseg. & Shiro Kobay.
- Clerodendrum japonicum (Thunb.) Sweet
- Clerodendrum johnstonii Oliv.
- Clerodendrum johorense Moldenke
- Clerodendrum kaichianum P.S.Hsu
- Clerodendrum kamhyoae Phillipson & L.Allorge
- Clerodendrum kampotense Dop
- Clerodendrum kauderni Moldenke
- Clerodendrum kiangsiense Merr. ex H.L.Li
- Clerodendrum kinabaluense Stapf
- Clerodendrum klemmei Elmer
- Clerodendrum kwangtungense Hand.-Mazz.
- Clerodendrum laciniatum Balf.f.
- Clerodendrum laevifolium Blume
- Clerodendrum lanceoliferum S.Moore
- Clerodendrum lanessanii Dop
- Clerodendrum lankawiense King & Gamble
- Clerodendrum lanuginosum Blume
- Clerodendrum lastellei Moldenke
- Clerodendrum laxiflorum Baker
- Clerodendrum lecomtei Dop
- Clerodendrum leucobotrys Breteler
- Clerodendrum leucophloeum Balf.f.
- Clerodendrum lindleyi Decne. ex Planch.
- Clerodendrum lloydianum Craib
- Clerodendrum longiflorum Decne.
- Clerodendrum longisepalum Dop
- Clerodendrum lutambense Verdc.
- Clerodendrum luteopunctatum C.Pei & S.L.Chen
- Clerodendrum macrocalycinum Baker
- Clerodendrum macrostegium Schauer
- Clerodendrum madagascariense Moldenke
- Clerodendrum magnificum Warb.
- Clerodendrum magnoliifolium Baker
- Clerodendrum mananjariense Moldenke
- Clerodendrum mandarinorum Diels
- Clerodendrum mandrarense Moldenke
- Clerodendrum manombense Moldenke
- Clerodendrum melanocrater Gürke
- Clerodendrum micans Gürke
- Clerodendrum mildbraedii B.Thomas
- Clerodendrum minahassae Teijsm. & Binn.
- Clerodendrum mindorense Merr.
- Clerodendrum moramangense Moldenke
- Clerodendrum morigono Chiov.
- Clerodendrum multibracteatum Merr.
- Clerodendrum myrianthum Mildbr.
- Clerodendrum myrmecophilum Ridl.
- Clerodendrum myrtifolium Moldenke
- Clerodendrum nhatrangense Dop ex Satthaphorn
- Clerodendrum nicolsonii A.Rajendran & P.Daniel
- Clerodendrum nutans Wall. ex Jack
- Clerodendrum ohwii Kaneh. & Hatus.
- Clerodendrum palmatolobatum Dop ex Satthaphorn, A.J.Paton & Leerat.
- Clerodendrum paniculatum L.
- Clerodendrum parvitubulatum B.Thomas
- Clerodendrum parvulum L.S.Sm.
- Clerodendrum paucidentatum Moldenke
- Clerodendrum pauciflorum Moldenke
- Clerodendrum peii Moldenke
- Clerodendrum peregrinum Moldenke
- Clerodendrum perrieri Moldenke
- Clerodendrum petasites (Lour.) S.Moore
- Clerodendrum petunioides Baker
- Clerodendrum phlomidis L.f.
- Clerodendrum phyllomega Steud.
- Clerodendrum pierreanum Dop
- Clerodendrum pleiosciadium Gürke
- Clerodendrum poggei Gürke
- Clerodendrum polyanthum Gürke
- Clerodendrum polycephalum Baker
- Clerodendrum porphyrocalyx Lauterb. & K.Schum.
- Clerodendrum praetervisa Guinea
- Clerodendrum premnoides Moldenke
- Clerodendrum preslii Elmer
- Clerodendrum pubiflorum (Bakh. ex Moldenke) Wearn
- Clerodendrum putre Schauer
- Clerodendrum pygmaeum Merr.
- Clerodendrum pynaertii De Wild.
- Clerodendrum pyrifolium Baker
- Clerodendrum quadriloculare (Blanco) Merr.
- Clerodendrum ramosissimum Baker
- Clerodendrum revolutum Bosser
- Clerodendrum ridleyi King & Gamble
- Clerodendrum robecchii Chiov.
- Clerodendrum robustum Klotzsch
- Clerodendrum roseiflorum Moldenke
- Clerodendrum rotundifolium Oliv.
- Clerodendrum rubellum Baker
- Clerodendrum rumphianum de Vriese
- Clerodendrum sakaleonense Moldenke
- Clerodendrum sarawakanum H.J.Lam
- Clerodendrum sassandrense Jongkind
- Clerodendrum sayapense Wearn
- Clerodendrum schmidtii C.B.Clarke
- Clerodendrum schweinfurthii Gürke
- Clerodendrum silvanum Henriq.
- Clerodendrum singwanum B.Thomas
- Clerodendrum sinuatum Hook.
- Clerodendrum smitinandii Moldenke
- Clerodendrum speciosissimum Jacob-Makoy
- Clerodendrum splendens G.Don
- Clerodendrum subpeltatum Wernham
- Clerodendrum subtruncatum Moldenke
- Clerodendrum sylvae J.-G.Adam
- Clerodendrum sylvestre Moldenke
- Clerodendrum tanganyikense Baker
- Clerodendrum tatei (F.Muell.) Munir
- Clerodendrum ternatum Schinz
- Clerodendrum thomsoniae Balf.f.
- Clerodendrum thouarsii Phillipson & Callm.
- Clerodendrum thyrsoideum Gürke
- Clerodendrum tibetanum C.Y.Wu & S.K.Wu
- Clerodendrum tomentellum Hutch. & Dalziel
- Clerodendrum tomentosum (Vent.) R.Br.
- Clerodendrum tonkinense Dop
- Clerodendrum toxicarium Baker
- Clerodendrum tracyanum (F.Muell.) Benth.
- Clerodendrum trichanthum Bosser
- Clerodendrum tricholobum Gürke
- Clerodendrum trichotomum Thunb.
- Clerodendrum triflorum Vis.
- Clerodendrum tubulosum Moldenke
- Clerodendrum umbellatum Poir.
- Clerodendrum umbratile King & Gamble
- Clerodendrum urticifolium (Roxb.) Wall. ex Voigt
- Clerodendrum villosicalyx Moldenke
- Clerodendrum villosum Blume
- Clerodendrum vinosum Moldenke
- Clerodendrum volubile P.Beauv.
- Clerodendrum wallii Moldenke
- Clerodendrum welwitschii Gürke
- Clerodendrum williamsii Elmer
- Clerodendrum yunnanense Hu

=== Formerly placed here ===
- Pseudocaryopteris foetida (D.Don) P.D.Cantino (as C. foetidum D.Don)
- Rotheca incisa (Klotzsch) Steane & Mabb. (as C. incisum Klotzsch or C. macrosiphon Hook.f.)
- Rotheca myricoides (Hochst.) Steane & Mabb. (as C. myricoides (Hochst.) Vatke or C. ugandense Prain)
- Rotheca serrata (L.) Steane & Mabb. (as C. serratum (L.) Moon)
- Volkameria aculeata L. (as C. aculeatum (L.) Schltdl.)
- Volkameria glabra (E.Mey.) Mabb. & Y.W.Yuan (as C. glabrum E.Mey.)
- Volkameria inermis L. (as C. inerme (L.) Gaertn.)
- Volkameria ligustrina Jacq. (as C. ligustrinum (Jacq.) R.Br.)

== Gallery ==
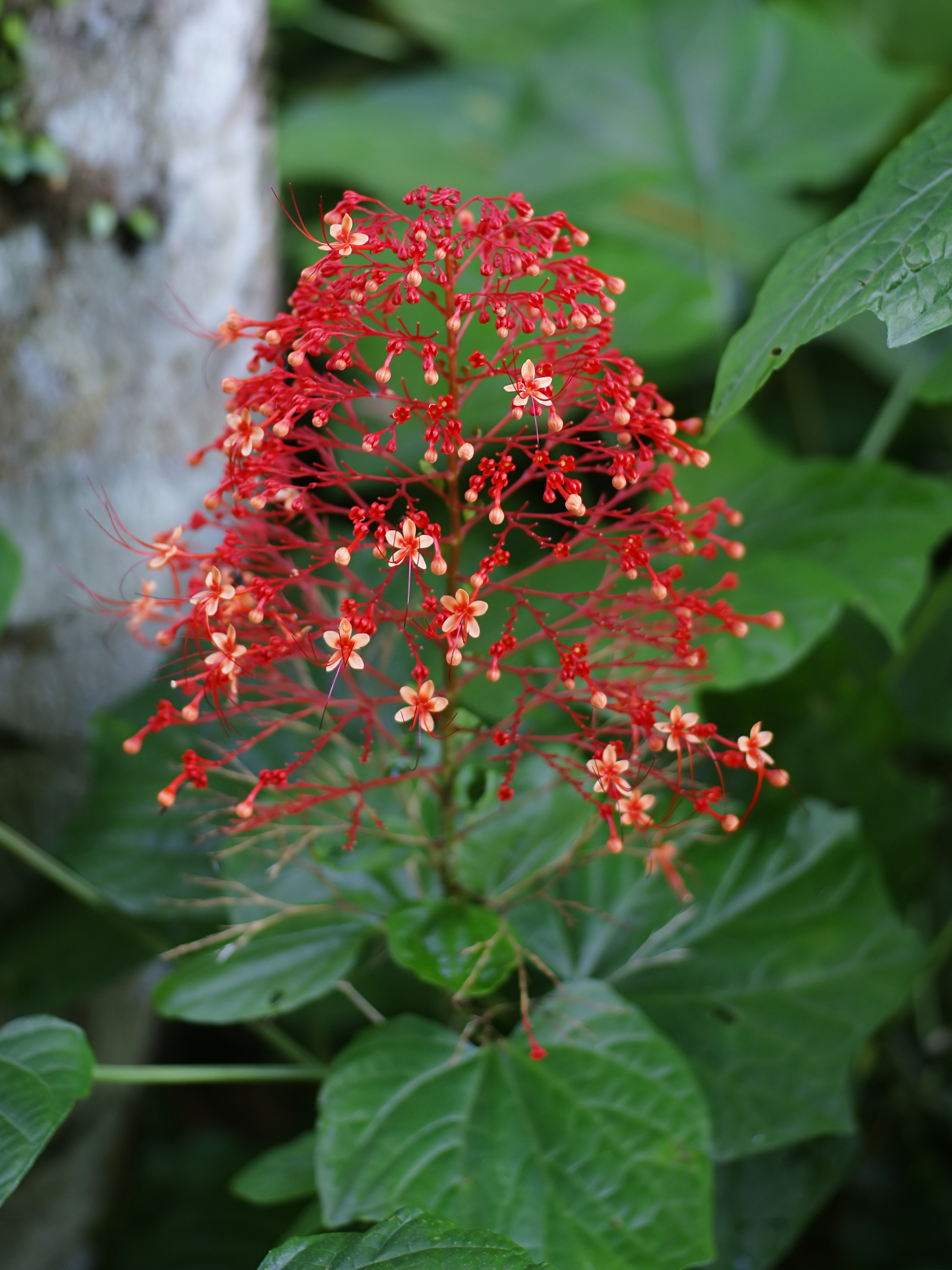
Clerodendrum paniculatum

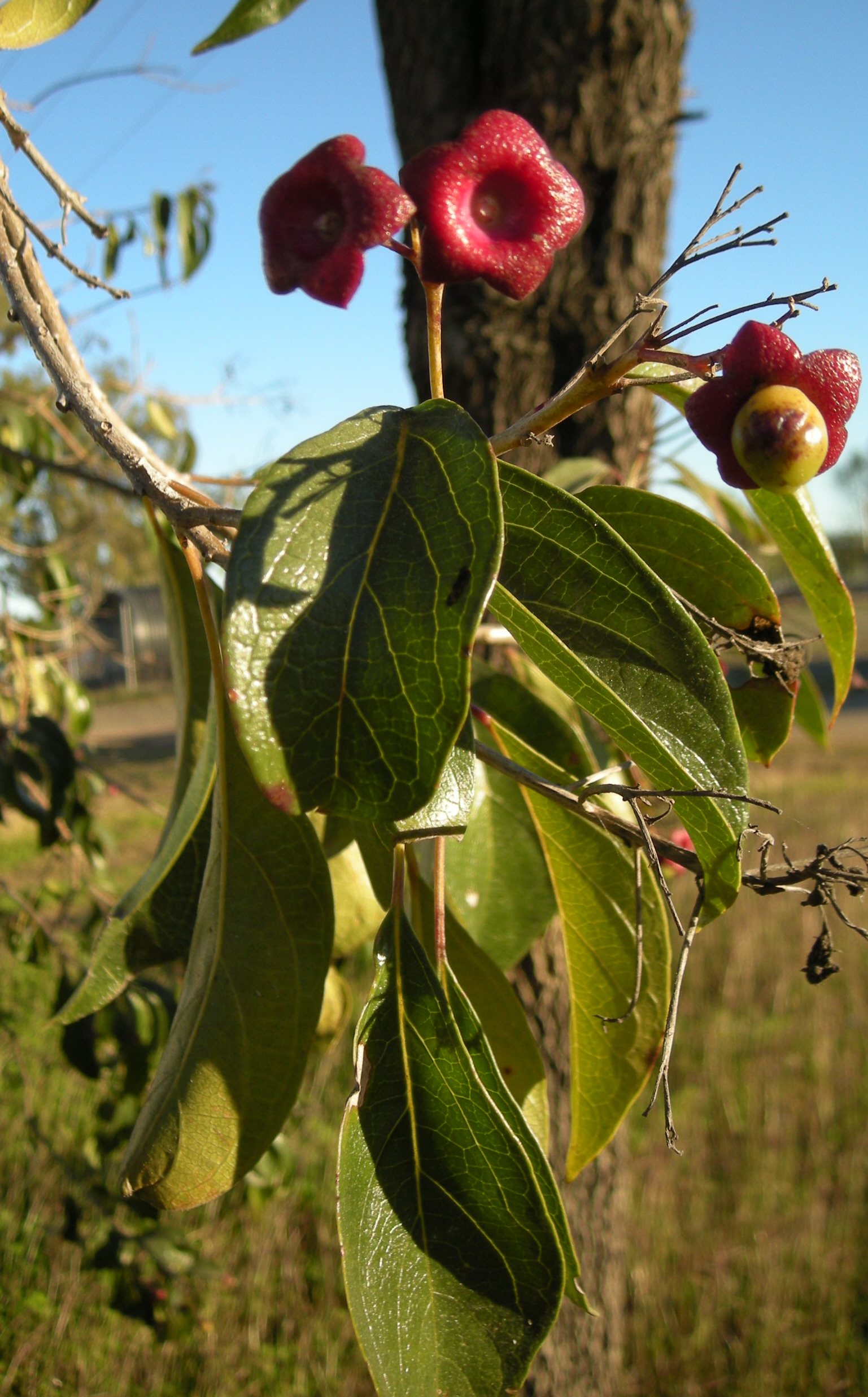
C. floribundum fruit and foliage, coastal Central Queensland

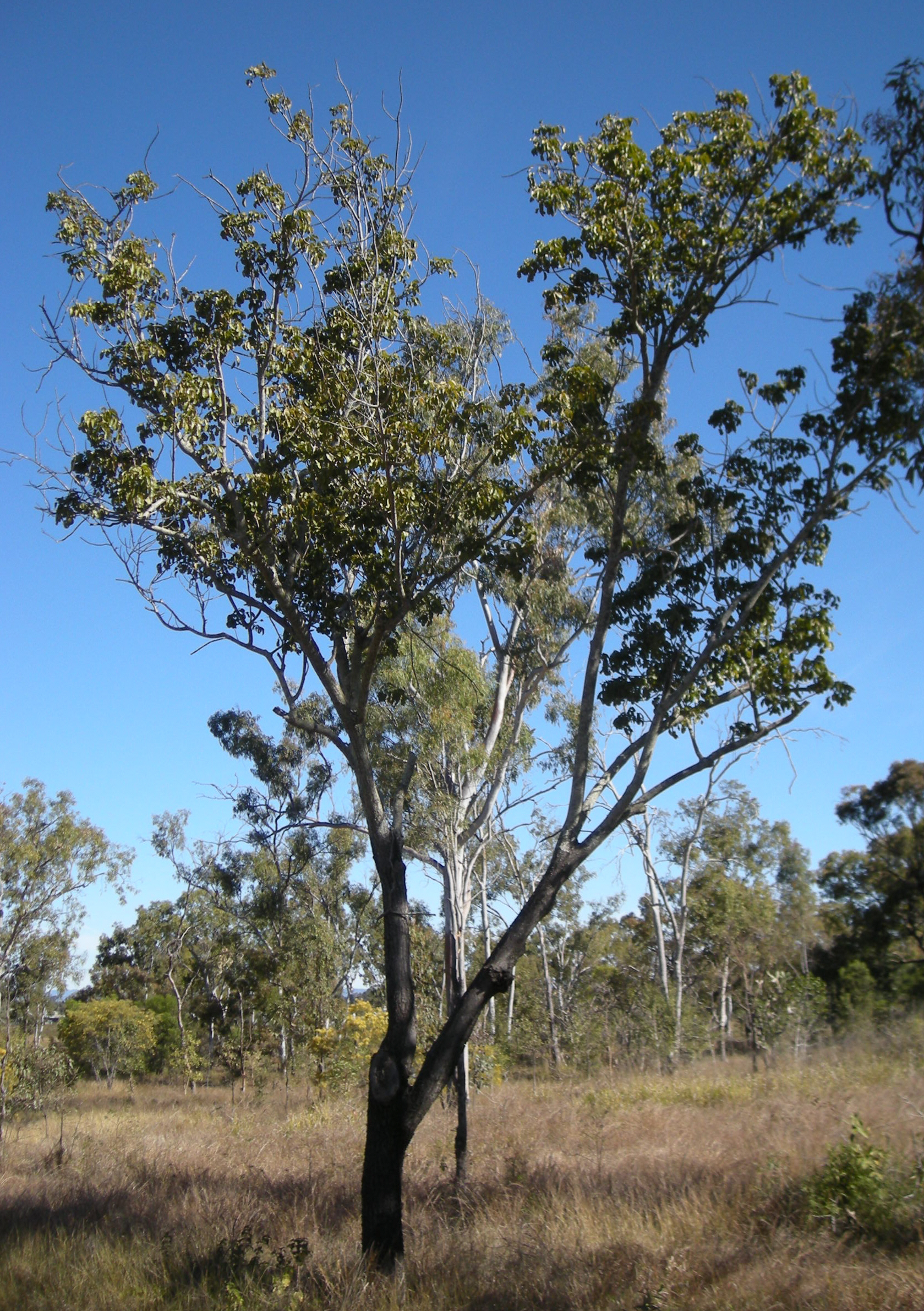
C. floribundum tree, coastal Central Queensland

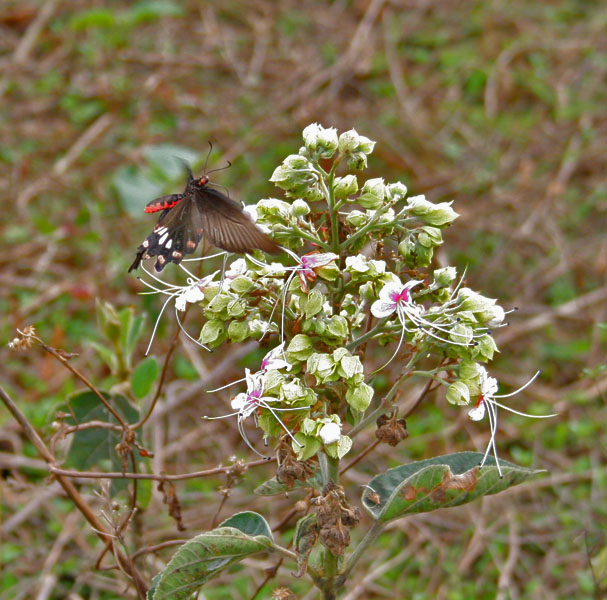
Common Rose Pachliopta aristolochiae on Clerodendrum viscosum at Samsing in Darjeeling district of West Bengal, India.

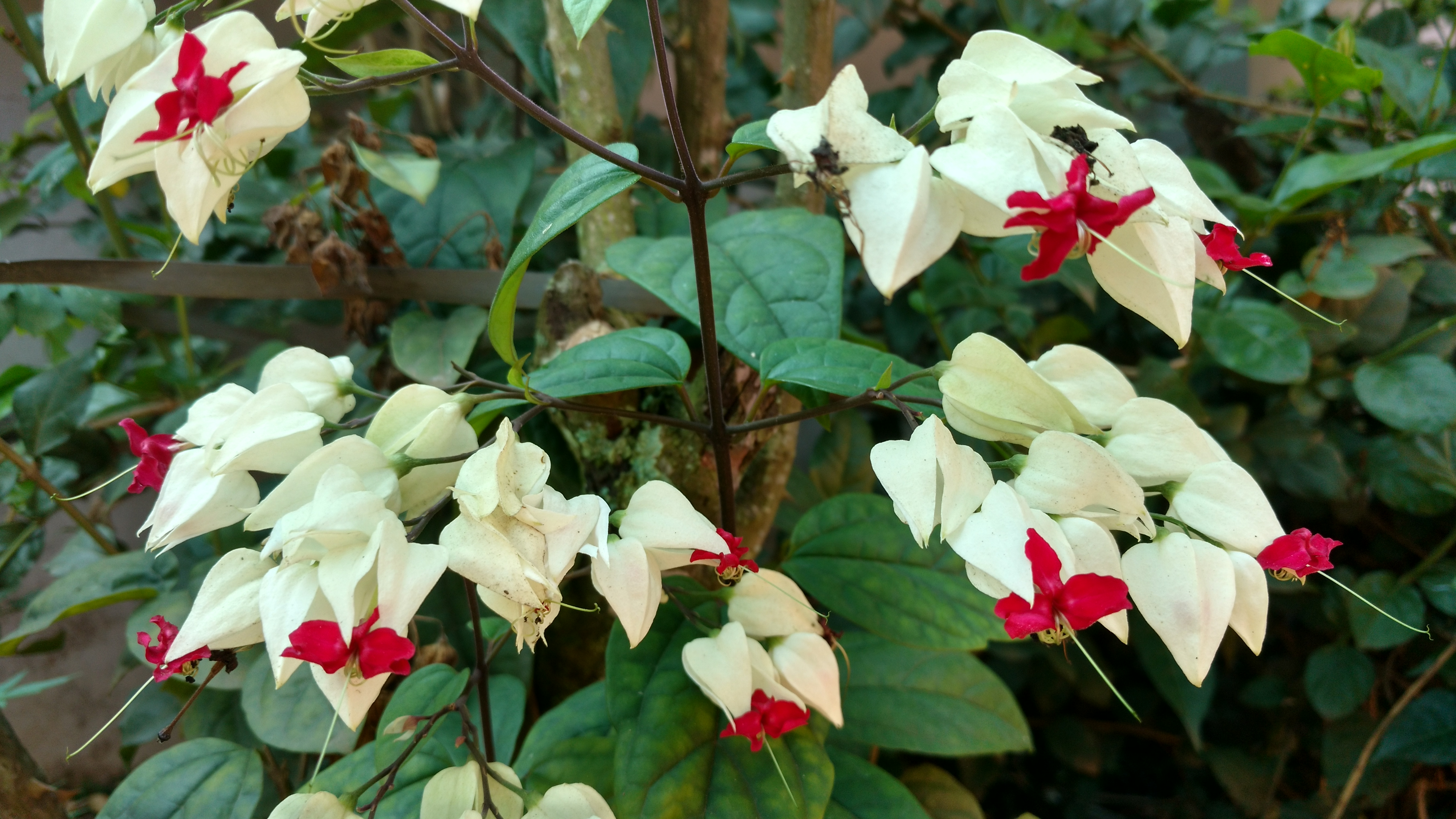
Bleeding heart at Wayanad, Kerala

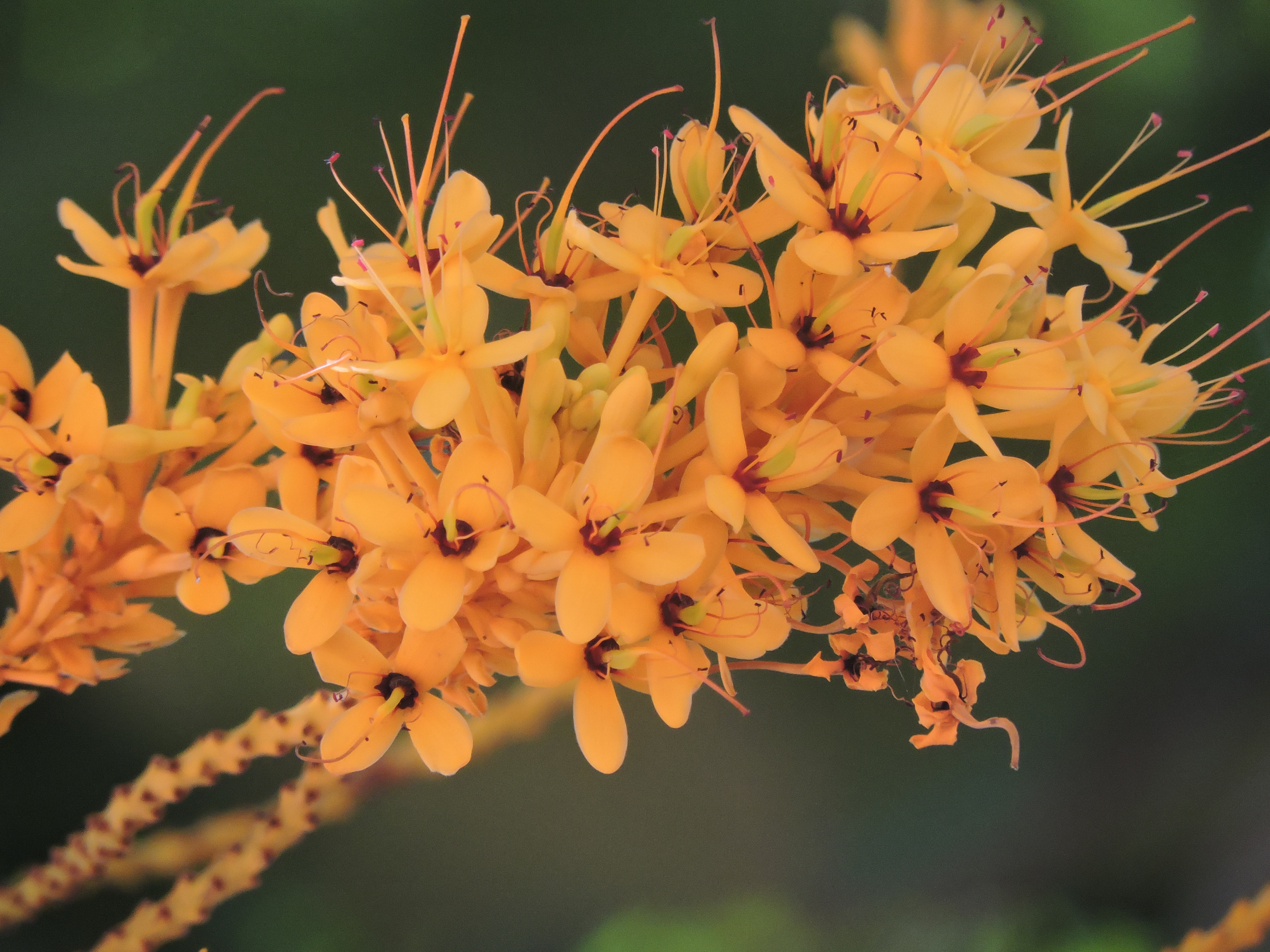
Glorybower Flower in Bangalore, India
