= Clerodendrum cochinchinense =

Scientific classification
- Kingdom: Plantae
- Clade: Tracheophytes
- Clade: Angiosperms
- Clade: Eudicots
- Clade: Asterids
- Order: Lamiales
- Family: Lamiaceae
- Genus: Clerodendrum
- Species: C. cochinchinense

Binomial name
- Clerodendrum cochinchinense Dop, 1920

Species of flowering plant

Clerodendrum cochinchinense is an Asian species of flowering plant in the family Lamiaceae. This species is found in Cambodia and Vietnam.
