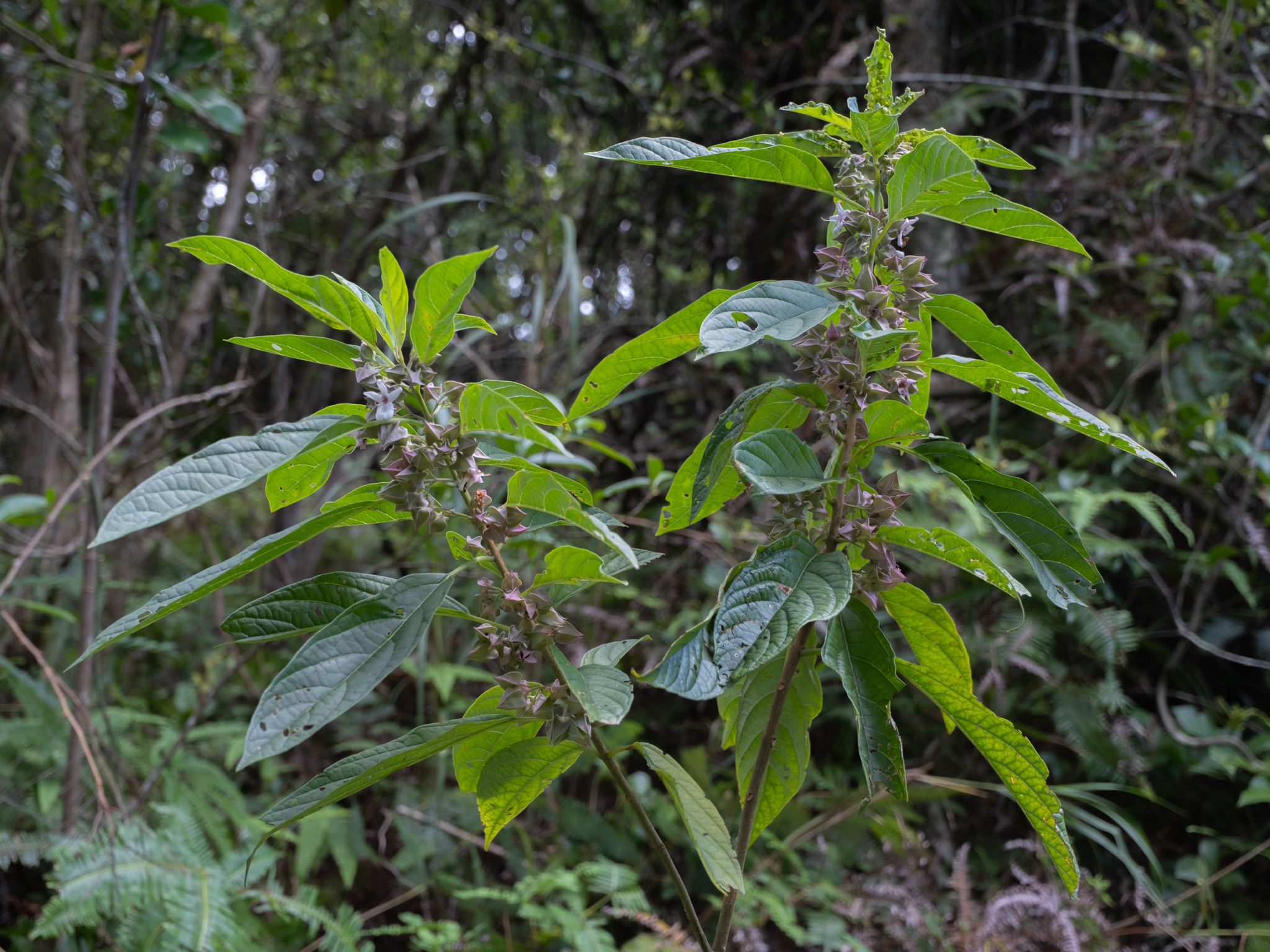

Scientific classification
- Kingdom: Plantae
- Clade: Tracheophytes
- Clade: Angiosperms
- Clade: Eudicots
- Clade: Asterids
- Order: Lamiales
- Family: Lamiaceae
- Genus: Clerodendrum
- Species: C. fortunatum

Binomial name
- Clerodendrum fortunatum L.

= Clerodendrum fortunatum =

Species of flowering plant

Clerodendrum fortunatum, is a species of flowering plant in the mint family (Lamiaceae). It is a shrub of up to 2.5 meters tall. It is native to parts of Southeast China, Philippines, and Vietnam.

== Taxonomy ==
Clerodendrum fortunatum was first described by Carl Linnaeus in 1756.
