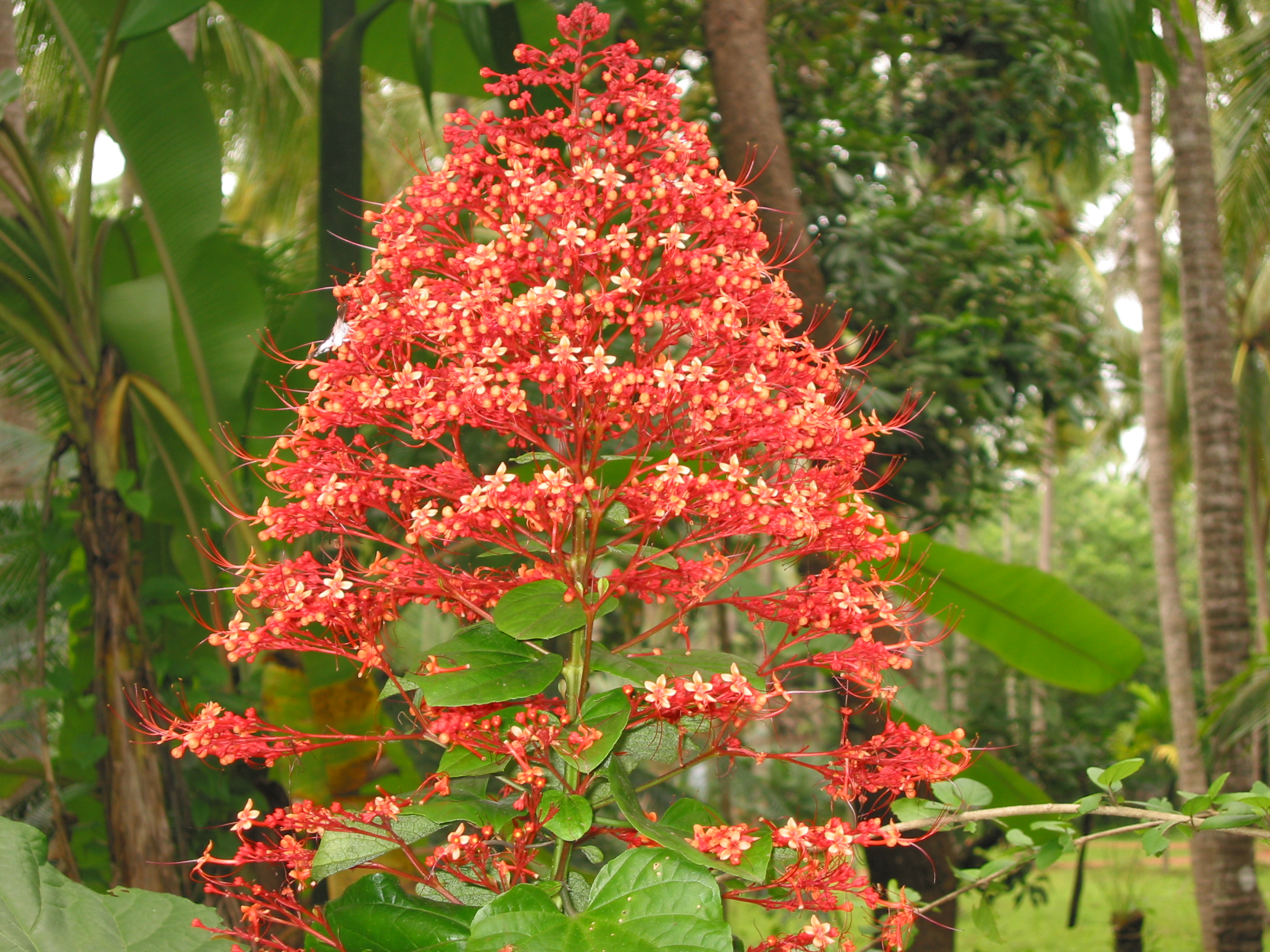

Scientific classification
- Kingdom: Plantae
- Clade: Tracheophytes
- Clade: Angiosperms
- Clade: Eudicots
- Clade: Asterids
- Order: Lamiales
- Family: Lamiaceae
- Genus: Clerodendrum
- Species: C. paniculatum

Binomial name
- Clerodendrum paniculatum L.

Synonyms
- Caprifolium paniculatum Noronha; Cleianthus coccineus Lour. ex B.A.Gomes; Clerodendrum pyramidale Andrews; Clerodendrum diversifolium Vahl; Clerodendrum splendidum Wall. ex Griff.; Volkameria angulata Lour.; Volkameria diversifolia Vahl

= Clerodendrum paniculatum =

Species of flowering plant

Clerodendrum paniculatum, the pagoda flower, is a species of flowering plant in the genus Clerodendrum of the Mint Family (Lamiaceae). It is native to tropical Asia and Papuasia (southern China, Taiwan, Indochina, southern India, Bangladesh, Sri Lanka, Andaman & Nicobar Islands, Borneo, Sulawesi, Sumatra, Philippines, Bismarck Archipelago), Fiji, and French Polynesia. It is introduced in Central America. It is noted for its red flowers, arranged in a thyrsoid cyme up to 40 cm (16 in) long by 38 cm (15 in) wide, and very precisely formed.

== Gallery ==
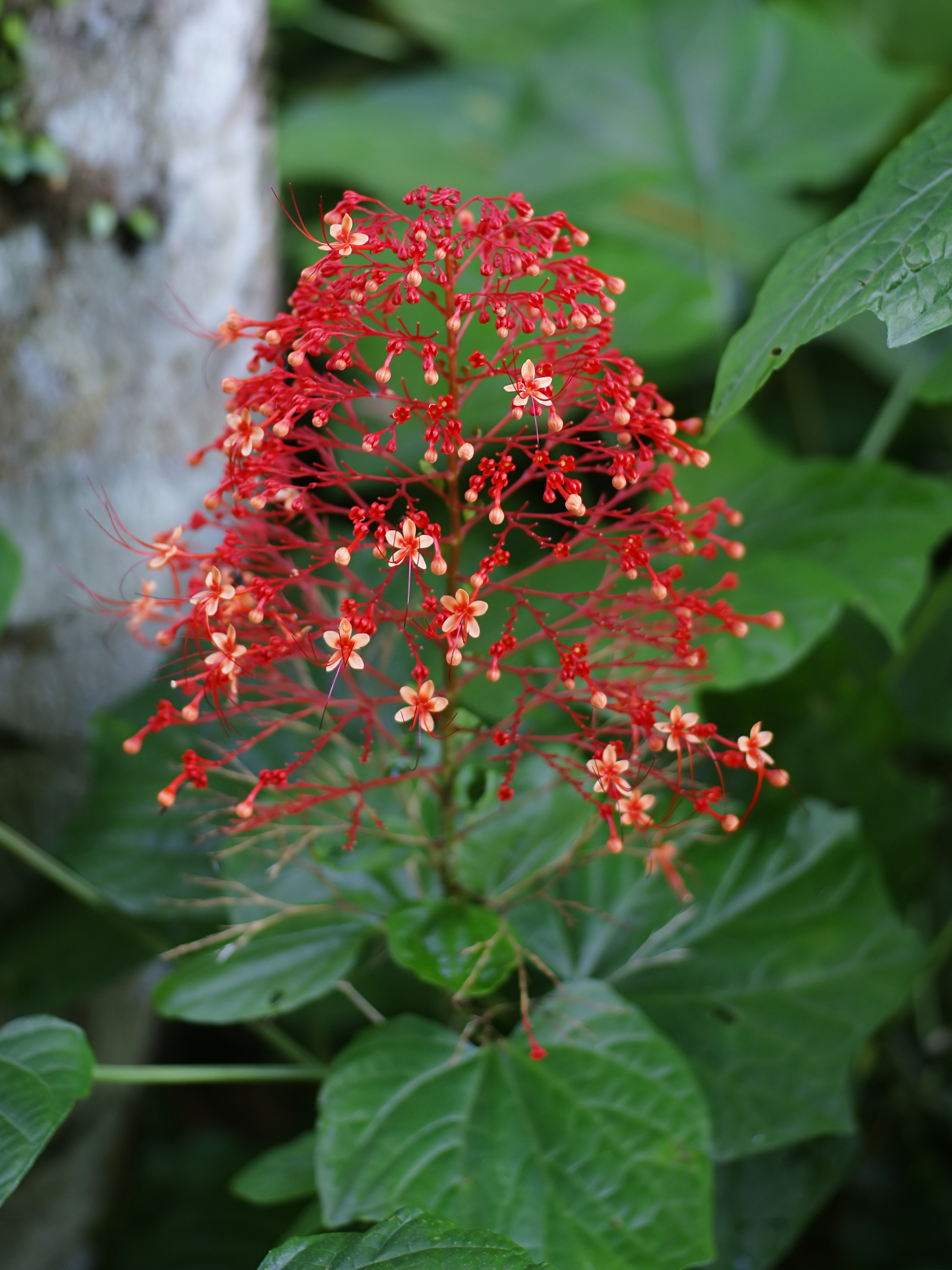

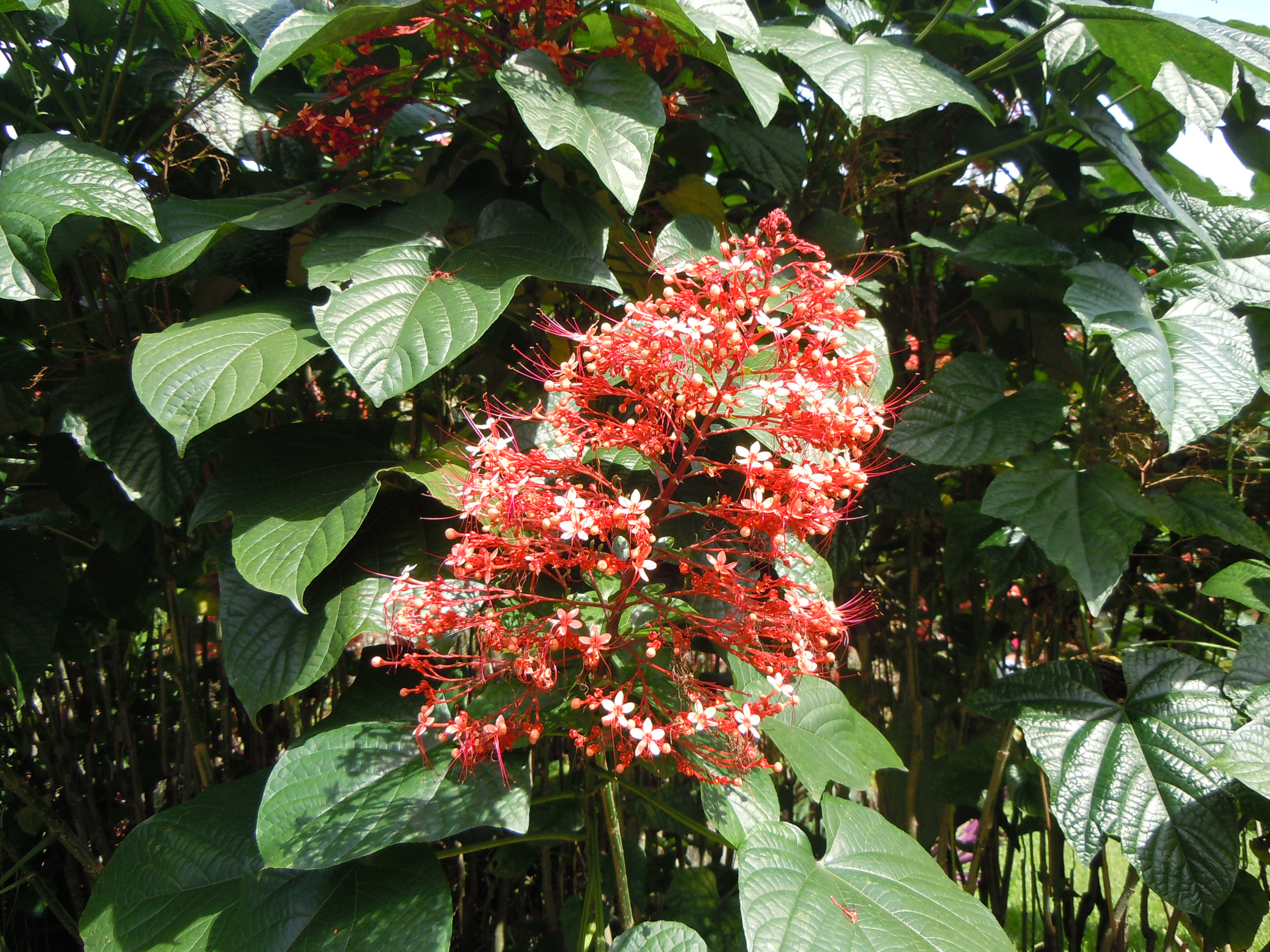

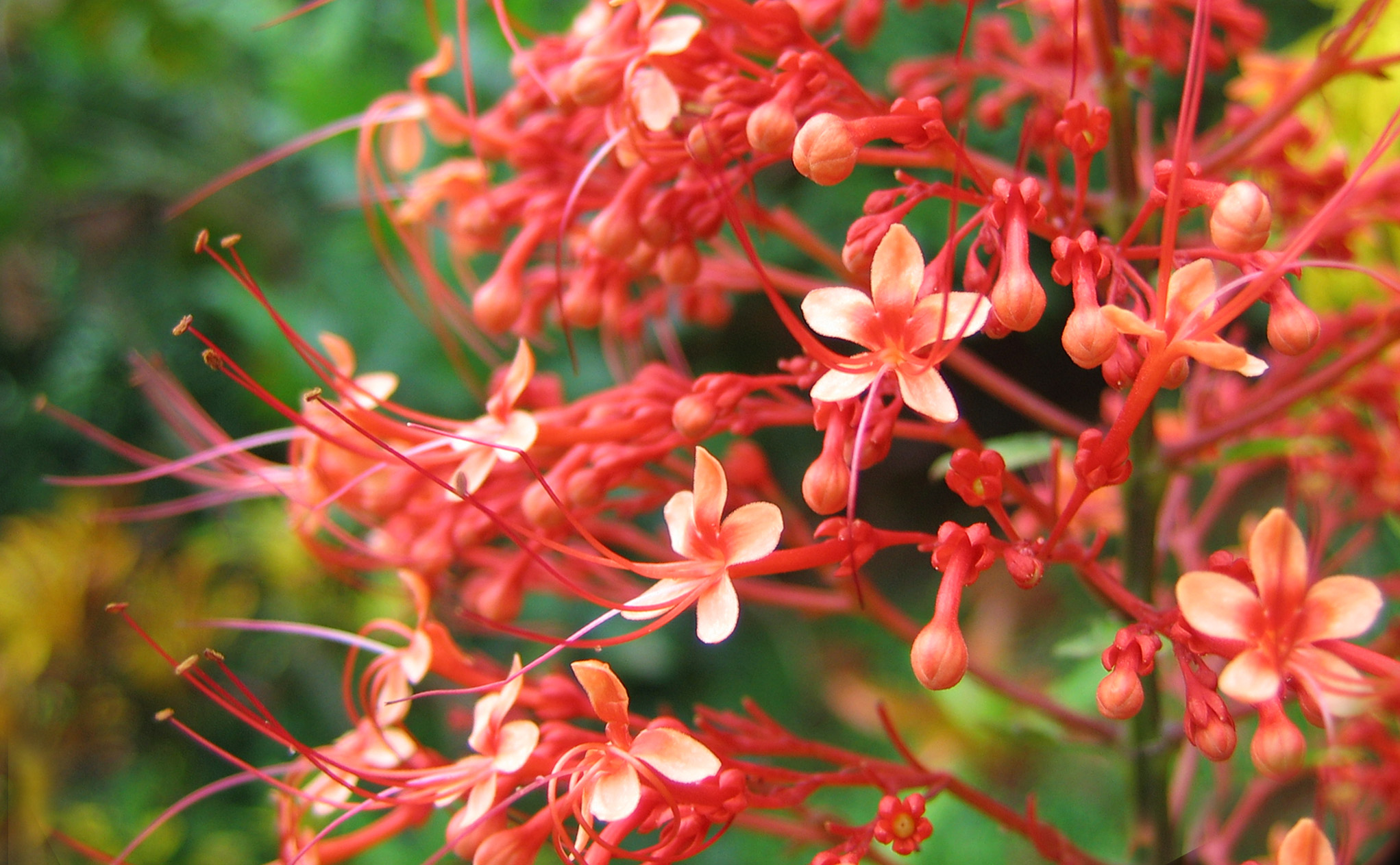

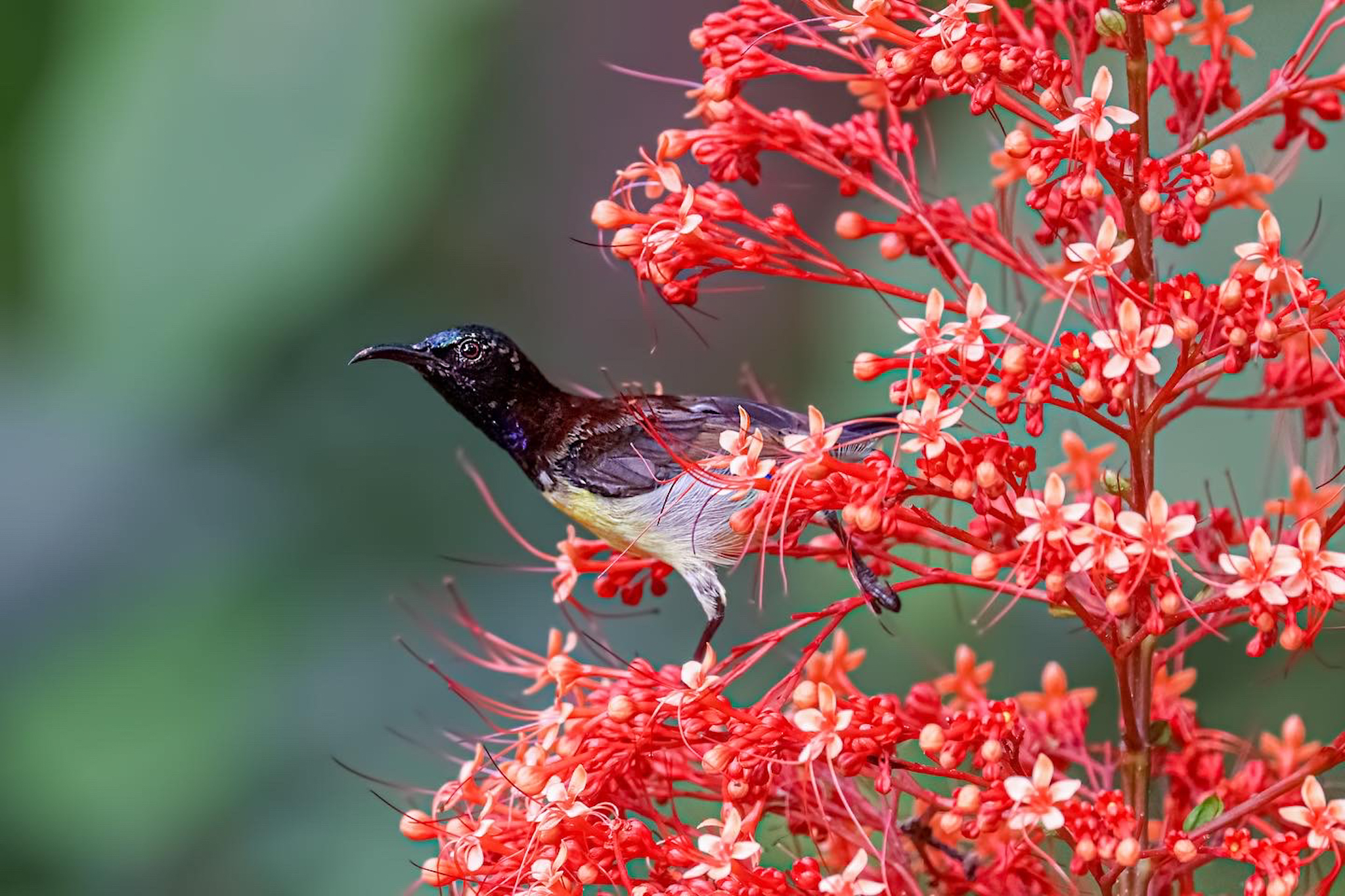
Closeup with bird

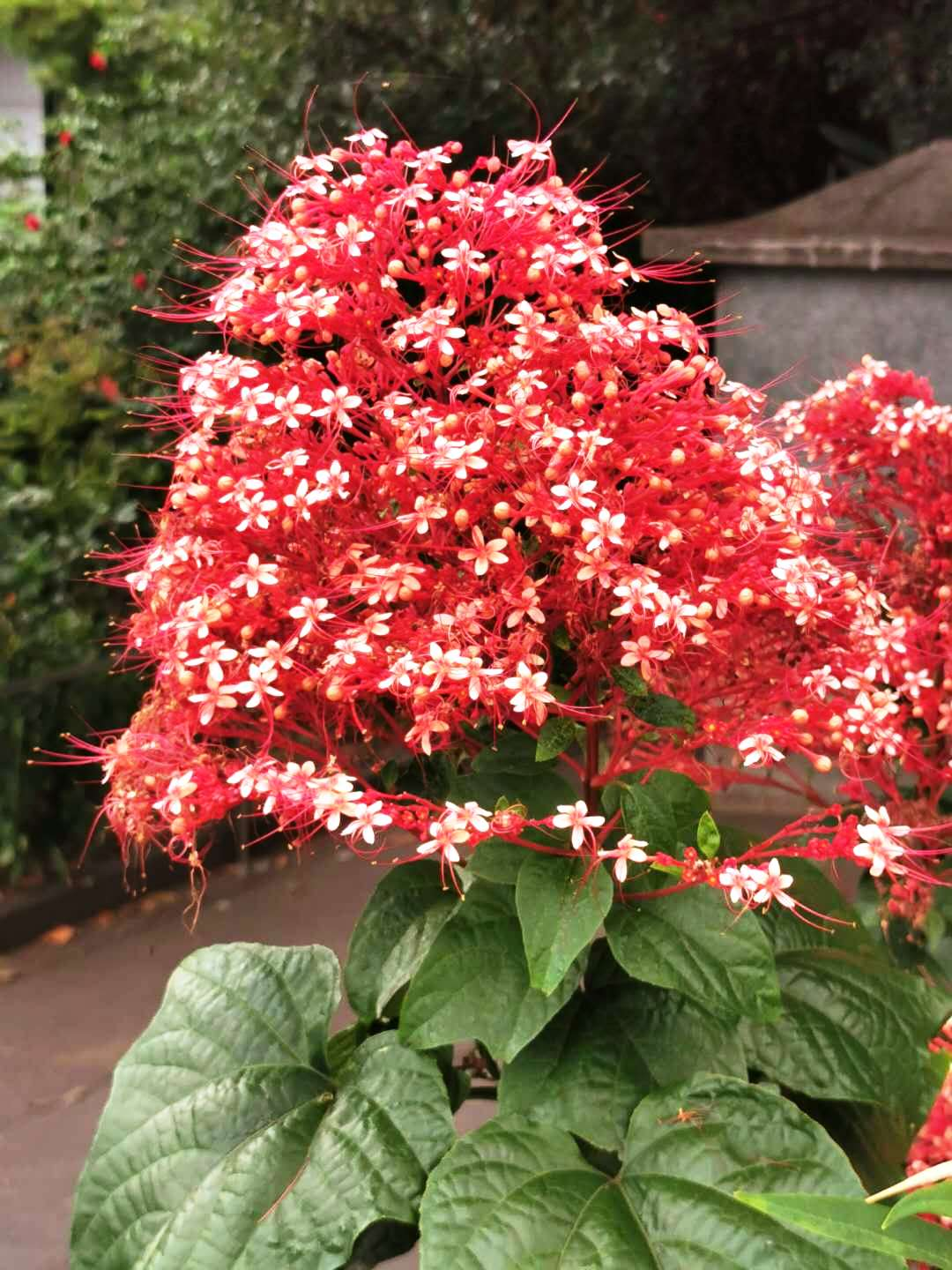

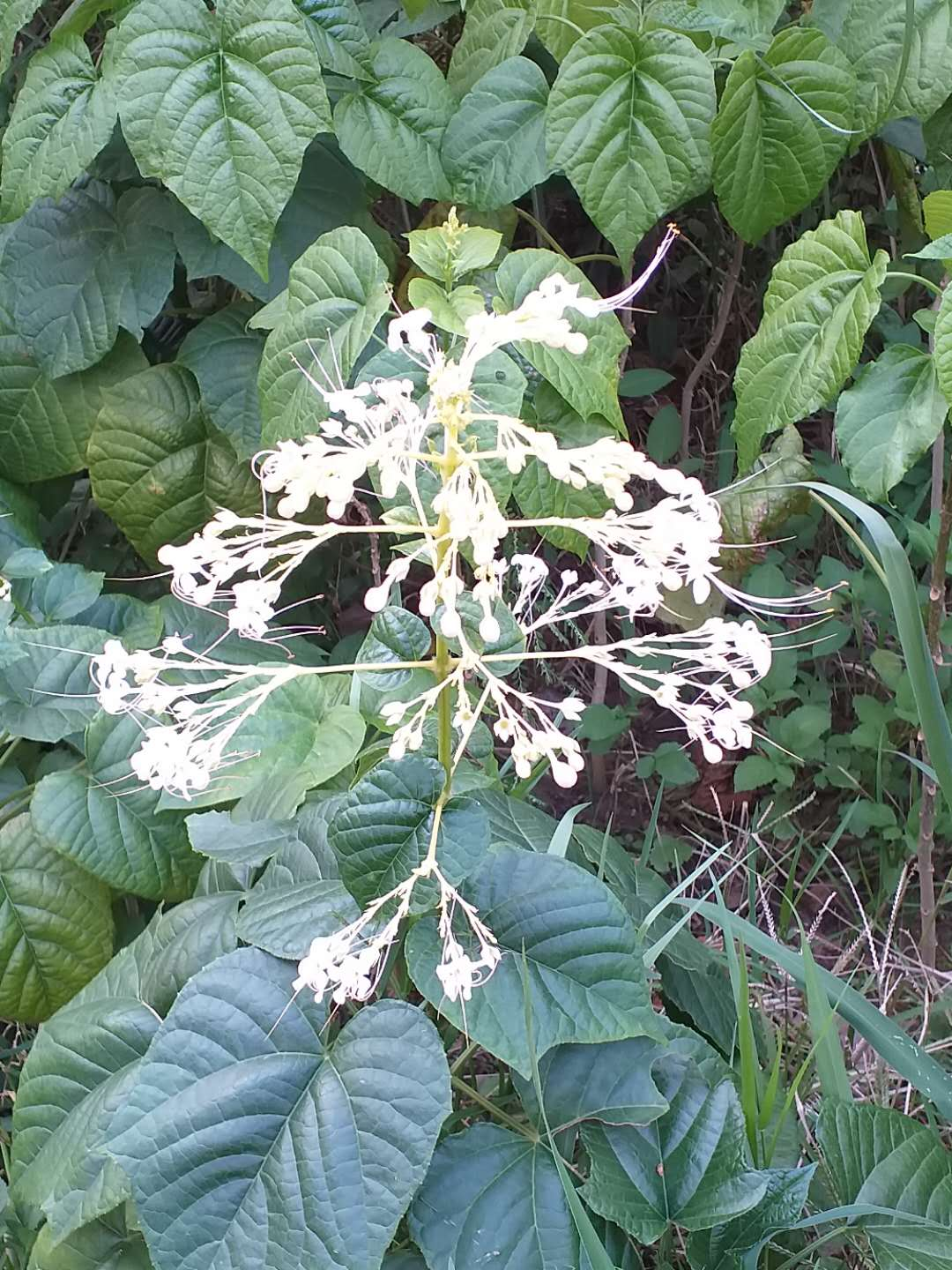
