= P. japonica =

P. japonica may refer to:

== Algae ==
- Padina japonica, a species of brown alga in the family Dictyotaceae
- Peyssonnelia japonica, a species of red alga in the family Peyssonneliaceae
- Polysiphonia japonica, red hair algae, a species of alga in the family Rhodomelaceae

== Arthropods ==
- Paralomis japonica, a species of king crab
- Panorpa japonica, the common Japanese scorpionfly, a species in the family Panorpidae
- Paromola japonica, a species of carrier crab
- Patanga japonica, a species of grasshopper found in Japan
- Peridaedala japonica, a species of moth in the family Tortricidae
- Phyllodesma japonica, a species of moth in the family Lasiocampidae
- Phyllonorycter japonica, a species of moth in the family Gracillariidae
- Pollenia japonica, a species of cluster fly in the family Polleniidae
- Popillia japonica, the Japanese beetle, a species of insect
- Pseudosasa japonica, the arrow bamboo, a species of bamboo in the family Poaceae
- Psilogramma japonica, a species of moth in the family Sphingidae
- Pterolophia japonica, a species of beetle in the family Cerambycidae

== Molluscs ==
- Philbertia japonica, a species of sea snail in the family Raphitomidae
- Pterygia japonica, a species of sea snail in the family Mitridae
- Punctoterebra japonica, a species of sea snail in the family Terebridae

== Plants ==
- Paeonia japonica, a plant species native of the islands of northern Japan
- Paris japonica, a species of flowering plant in the family Melanthiaceae
- Peperomia japonica, a species of plant in the family Piperaceae
- Phalaenopsis japonica, a species of epiphyte in the family Orchidaceae
- Phanera japonica, a species of flowering plant in the family Fabaceae
- Phytolacca japonica, a species of flowering plant in the family Phytolaccaceae
- Pieris japonica, the Japanese andromeda, a plant species native to eastern Asia and Japan
- Pogonia japonica, an orchid species occurring from China to Japan
- Pollia japonica, the yabumyoga, a perennial flower species native to East Asia
- Polygala japonica, a species of flowering plant in the family Polygalaceae
- Primula japonica, the Japanese primrose, a species of flowering plant in the family Primulaceae
- Prunus japonica, the Korean cherry, flowering almond or Oriental bush cherry, a shrub species
- Pseudotsuga japonica, the Japanese Douglas-fir, a conifer species endemic to Japan

== Other ==
- Perophora japonica, a species of colonial sea squirt in the family Perophoridae

== Synonyms ==
- Potanthus japonica, a synonym for Potanthus flavus, a species of butterfly in the family Hesperiidae
- Pseudotorynorrhina japonica, a synonym for Rhomborrhina japonica, a beetle species
- Pterocarya japonica, a synonym for Pterocarya stenoptera, the Chinese wingnut, a tree species originally from Southeast China

== See also ==
- Japonica (disambiguation)
