= Psilogramma anne =

Scientific classification
- Kingdom: Animalia
- Phylum: Arthropoda
- Class: Insecta
- Order: Lepidoptera
- Family: Sphingidae
- Genus: Psilogramma
- Species: P. anne

Binomial name
- Psilogramma anne Eitschberger, 2001

Synonyms
- Psilogramma anne aruensis Eitschberger, 2004

Species of moth

Psilogramma anne is a moth in the family Sphingidae. It is found in Papua New Guinea. This species is currently believed to be synonymous with Psilogramma menephron nebulosa.
