= Psilogramma choui =

Scientific classification
- Kingdom: Animalia
- Phylum: Arthropoda
- Class: Insecta
- Order: Lepidoptera
- Family: Sphingidae
- Genus: Psilogramma
- Species: P. choui

Binomial name
- Psilogramma choui Eitschberger, 2001

Species of moth

Psilogramma choui is a moth of the family Sphingidae. It is known from Zhejiang in China. Some sources, following Kitching and colleagues, consider it synonym of Psilogramma discistriga.
