= Psilogramma angelika =

Scientific classification
- Kingdom: Animalia
- Phylum: Arthropoda
- Class: Insecta
- Order: Lepidoptera
- Family: Sphingidae
- Genus: Psilogramma
- Species: P. angelika

Binomial name
- Psilogramma angelika Eitschberger, 2004

Species of moth

Psilogramma angelika is a moth of the family Sphingidae. It is known from Seram in Indonesia. This species is currently believed to be synonymous with Psilogramma sulawesica.
