= Psilogramma bartschereri =

Scientific classification
- Kingdom: Animalia
- Phylum: Arthropoda
- Class: Insecta
- Order: Lepidoptera
- Family: Sphingidae
- Genus: Psilogramma
- Species: P. bartschereri

Binomial name
- Psilogramma bartschereri Eitschberger, 2001

Species of moth

Psilogramma bartschereri is a moth of the family Sphingidae. It is known from Sri Lanka. This species is currently considered synonymous with Psilogramma menephron nebulosa.
