= Psilogramma gerstmeieri =

Scientific classification
- Kingdom: Animalia
- Phylum: Arthropoda
- Class: Insecta
- Order: Lepidoptera
- Family: Sphingidae
- Genus: Psilogramma
- Species: P. gerstmeieri

Binomial name
- Psilogramma gerstmeieri Eitschberger, 2001

Species of moth

Psilogramma gerstmeieri is a moth of the family Sphingidae. It is known from Guangdong, China. This species is currently believed to be synonymous with Psilogramma discistriga.
