= Psilogramma hainanensis =

Scientific classification
- Kingdom: Animalia
- Phylum: Arthropoda
- Class: Insecta
- Order: Lepidoptera
- Family: Sphingidae
- Genus: Psilogramma
- Species: P. hainanensis

Binomial name
- Psilogramma hainanensis Eitschberger, 2001

Species of moth

Psilogramma hainanensis is a moth of the family Sphingidae which is endemic to Hainan, China. This species is currently believed to be synonymous with Psilogramma discistriga.
