= Psilogramma gloriosa =

Scientific classification
- Kingdom: Animalia
- Phylum: Arthropoda
- Clade: Pancrustacea
- Class: Insecta
- Order: Lepidoptera
- Family: Sphingidae
- Genus: Psilogramma
- Species: P. gloriosa

Binomial name
- Psilogramma gloriosa Eitschberger, 2001

Species of moth

Psilogramma gloriosa is a moth of the family Sphingidae. It is known from Queensland, Australia. This species is currently believed to be a subspecies of Psilogramma menephron.
