= Psilogramma baueri =

Scientific classification
- Kingdom: Animalia
- Phylum: Arthropoda
- Class: Insecta
- Order: Lepidoptera
- Family: Sphingidae
- Genus: Psilogramma
- Species: P. baueri

Binomial name
- Psilogramma baueri Eitschberger, 2001

Species of moth

Psilogramma baueri is a moth of the family Sphingidae. It is known from the Moluccas. This species is currently believed to be synonymous with Psilogramma menephron.
