= Psilogramma andamanica =

Scientific classification
- Domain: Eukaryota
- Kingdom: Animalia
- Phylum: Arthropoda
- Class: Insecta
- Order: Lepidoptera
- Family: Sphingidae
- Genus: Psilogramma
- Species: P. andamanica

Binomial name
- Psilogramma andamanica Brechlin, 2001

Species of moth

Psilogramma andamanica is a moth of the family Sphingidae. It is known from the Andaman Islands. This species is currently believed to be synonymous with Psilogramma increta.
