= Psilogramma frankenbachi =

Scientific classification
- Kingdom: Animalia
- Phylum: Arthropoda
- Class: Insecta
- Order: Lepidoptera
- Family: Sphingidae
- Genus: Psilogramma
- Species: P. frankenbachi

Binomial name
- Psilogramma frankenbachi Eitschberger, 2001

Species of moth

Psilogramma frankenbachi is a moth of the family Sphingidae. It is known from Sulawesi in Indonesia. This species is currently considered to be a subspecies of Psilogramma menephron.
