= Psilogramma monastyrskii =

Scientific classification
- Kingdom: Animalia
- Phylum: Arthropoda
- Class: Insecta
- Order: Lepidoptera
- Family: Sphingidae
- Genus: Psilogramma
- Species: P. monastyrskii

Binomial name
- Psilogramma monastyrskii Eitschberger, 2001

Species of moth

Psilogramma monastyrskii is a moth of the family Sphingidae. It is known from Vietnam.
