= Psilogramma maxmouldsi =

Scientific classification
- Kingdom: Animalia
- Phylum: Arthropoda
- Clade: Pancrustacea
- Class: Insecta
- Order: Lepidoptera
- Family: Sphingidae
- Genus: Psilogramma
- Species: P. maxmouldsi

Binomial name
- Psilogramma maxmouldsi Eitschberger, 2001

Species of moth

Psilogramma maxmouldsi is a moth of the family Sphingidae. It is known from Queensland, Australia.
