= Psilogramma argos =

Scientific classification
- Kingdom: Animalia
- Phylum: Arthropoda
- Clade: Pancrustacea
- Class: Insecta
- Order: Lepidoptera
- Family: Sphingidae
- Genus: Psilogramma
- Species: P. argos

Binomial name
- Psilogramma argos Moulds & Lane, 1999

Species of moth

Psilogramma argos is a moth of the family Sphingidae. It is known from Western Australia, the Northern Territory and northern Queensland.
