= Psilogramma edii =

Psilogramma edit

Scientific classification
- Kingdom: Animalia
- Phylum: Arthropoda
- Class: Insecta
- Order: Lepidoptera
- Family: Sphingidae
- Genus: Psilogramma
- Species: P. edii

Binomial name
- Psilogramma edii Eitschberger, 2001

Species of moth

Psilogramma edii is a moth of the family Sphingidae. It is known from eastern Sumatra in Indonesia.
