= Psilogramma yilingae =

Scientific classification
- Kingdom: Animalia
- Phylum: Arthropoda
- Class: Insecta
- Order: Lepidoptera
- Family: Sphingidae
- Genus: Psilogramma
- Species: P. yilingae

Binomial name
- Psilogramma yilingae Eitschberger, 2001

Species of moth

Psilogramma yilingae is a moth of the family Sphingidae. It is known from Hubei and Hunan in China.
