= Psilogramma hauensteini =

Scientific classification
- Kingdom: Animalia
- Phylum: Arthropoda
- Class: Insecta
- Order: Lepidoptera
- Family: Sphingidae
- Genus: Psilogramma
- Species: P. hauensteini

Binomial name
- Psilogramma hauensteini Eitschberger, 2001

Species of insect

Psilogramma hauensteini is a moth of the family Sphingidae. It is known to Guizhou, China.
