= Psilogramma rupprechtorum =

Scientific classification
- Kingdom: Animalia
- Phylum: Arthropoda
- Class: Insecta
- Order: Lepidoptera
- Family: Sphingidae
- Genus: Psilogramma
- Species: P. rupprechtorum

Binomial name
- Psilogramma rupprechtorum Eitschberger, 2001

Species of moth

Psilogramma rupprechtorum is a moth of the family Sphingidae. It is known from Kalimantan in Indonesia.
