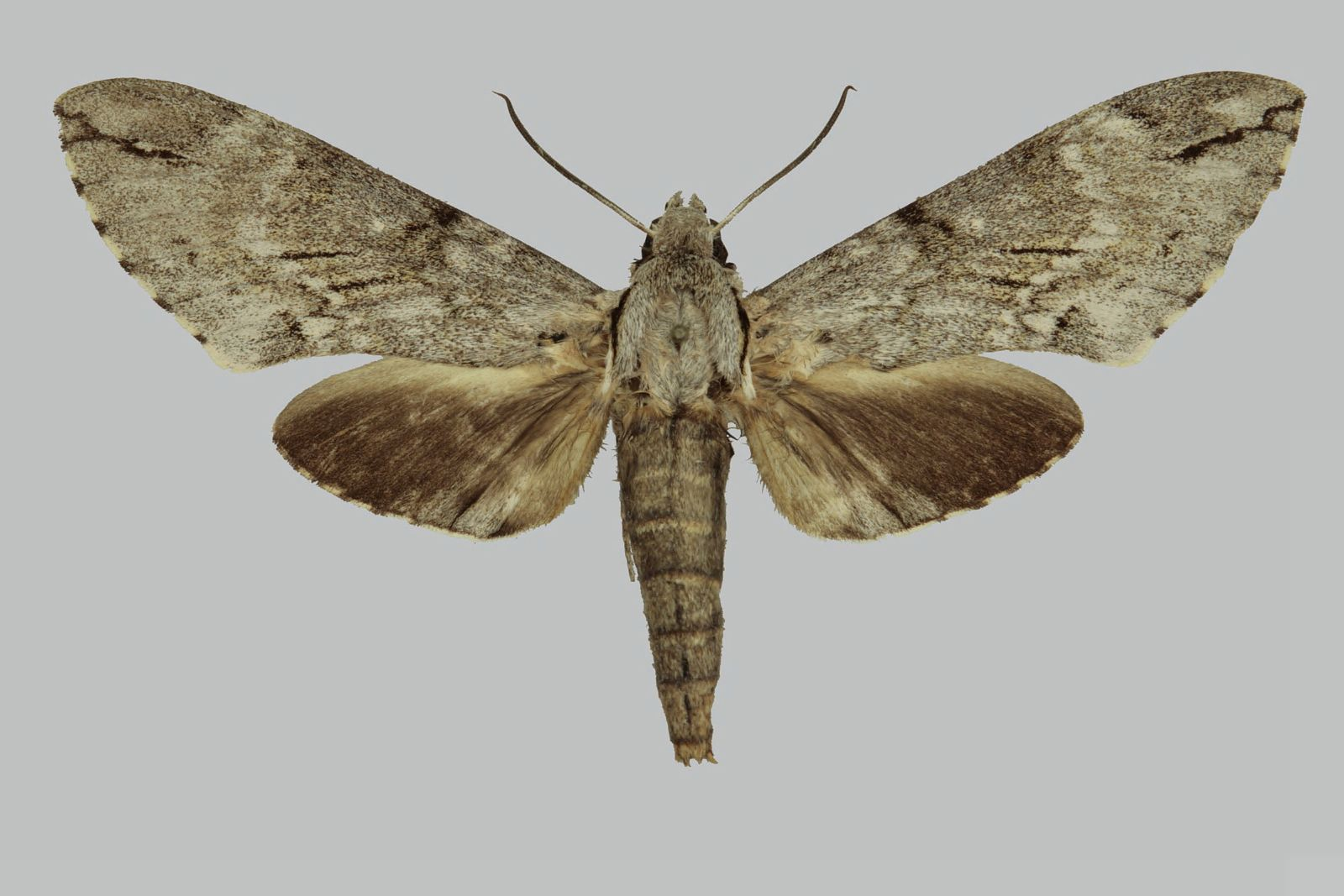

Scientific classification
- Kingdom: Animalia
- Phylum: Arthropoda
- Clade: Pancrustacea
- Class: Insecta
- Order: Lepidoptera
- Family: Sphingidae
- Genus: Psilogramma
- Species: P. villani

Binomial name
- Psilogramma villani Kitching, Treadaway & Hogenes, 2000

= Psilogramma villani =

Species of moth

Psilogramma villani is a moth of the family Sphingidae. It is known from the Philippines.
