= Peridaedala =

Scientific classification
- Domain: Eukaryota
- Kingdom: Animalia
- Phylum: Arthropoda
- Class: Insecta
- Order: Lepidoptera
- Family: Tortricidae
- Tribe: Eucosmini
- Genus: Peridaedala; Meyrick, 1925

Genus of tortrix moths

Peridaedala is a genus of moths belonging to the subfamily Olethreutinae of the family Tortricidae.

== Species ==
- Peridaedala algosa (Meyrick, 1912)
- Peridaedala archaea Diakonoff, 1953
- Peridaedala beryllina (Meyrick, 1925)
- Peridaedala chlorissa (Meyrick, 1912)
- Peridaedala crastidochroa Diakonoff, 1953
- Peridaedala dendrochlora Diakonoff, 1968
- Peridaedala enantiosema Diakonoff, 1983
- Peridaedala hagna Diakonoff, 1948
- Peridaedala hierograpta Meyrick, 1925
- Peridaedala japonica Oku, 1979
- Peridaedala melanantha Diakonoff, 1968
- Peridaedala physoptila Diakonoff, 1968
- Peridaedala prasina Diakonoff, 1953
- Peridaedala speculata Razowski, 2013
- Peridaedala stenoglypha Diakonoff, 1968
- Peridaedala stenygra Razowski, 2013
- Peridaedala thesaurophora Diakonoff, 1983
- Peridaedala thylacophora Diakonoff, 1968
- Peridaedala tonkinana Kuznetzov, 1988
- Peridaedala triangulosa Diakonoff, 1983

== See also ==
- List of Tortricidae genera
