= Psilogramma wannanensis =

Scientific classification
- Kingdom: Animalia
- Phylum: Arthropoda
- Class: Insecta
- Order: Lepidoptera
- Family: Sphingidae
- Genus: Psilogramma
- Species: P. wannanensis

Binomial name
- Psilogramma wannanensis Meng, 1990

Species of moth

Psilogramma wannanensis is a moth of the family Sphingidae. It is known from eastern China.
