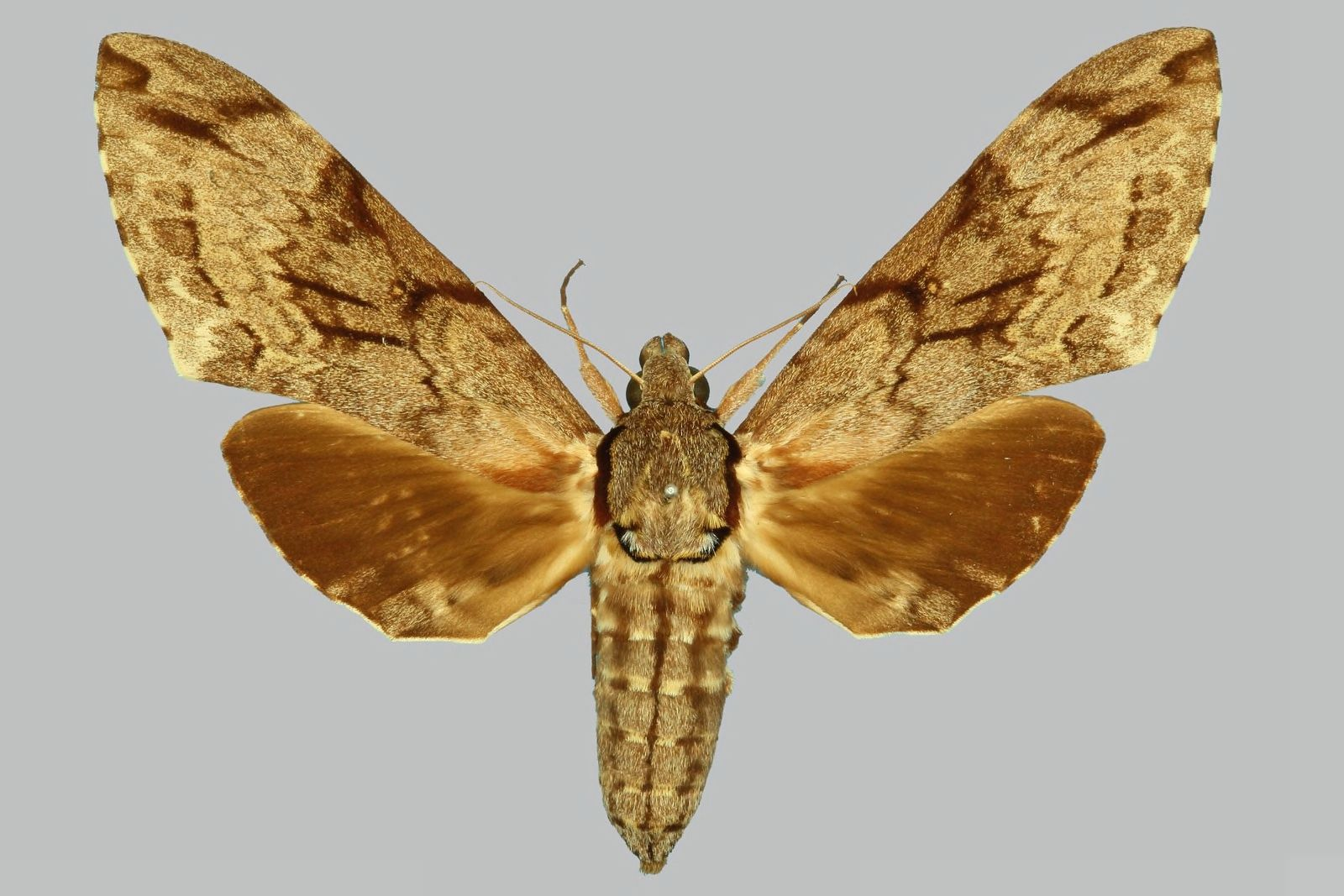
- Female Psilogramma orientalis

Scientific classification
- Kingdom: Animalia
- Phylum: Arthropoda
- Clade: Pancrustacea
- Class: Insecta
- Order: Lepidoptera
- Family: Sphingidae
- Genus: Psilogramma
- Species: P. orientalis

Binomial name
- Psilogramma orientalis Brechlin, 2001

= Psilogramma orientalis =

Species of moth

Psilogramma orientalis is a moth of the family Sphingidae. It is known from the Bismarck Archipelago, Papua New Guinea.
