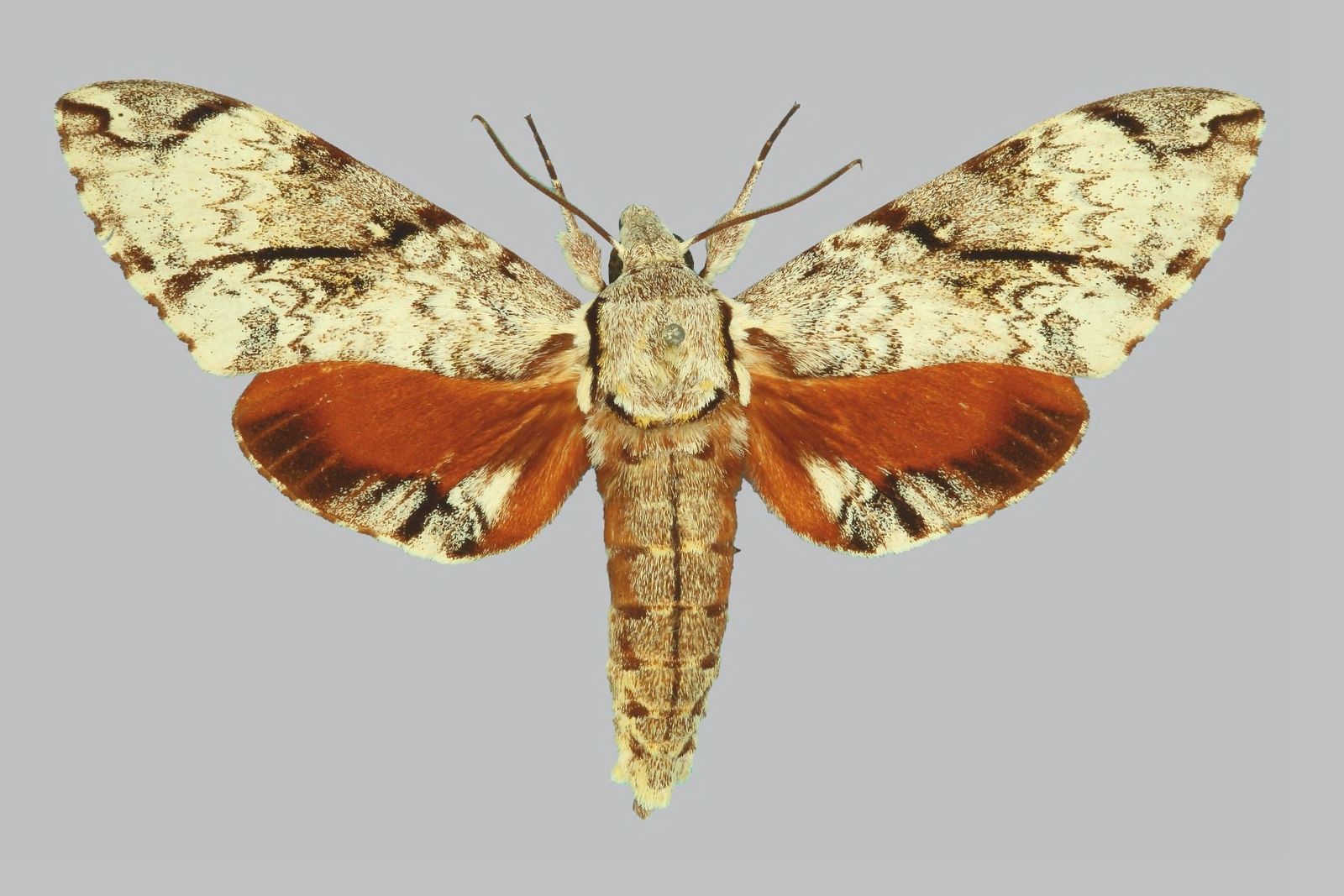

Scientific classification
- Domain: Eukaryota
- Kingdom: Animalia
- Phylum: Arthropoda
- Class: Insecta
- Order: Lepidoptera
- Family: Sphingidae
- Genus: Psilogramma
- Species: P. jordana

Binomial name
- Psilogramma jordana Bethune-Baker, 1905

= Psilogramma jordana =

Species of moth

Psilogramma jordana is a moth of the family Sphingidae. It is known from Fiji.
