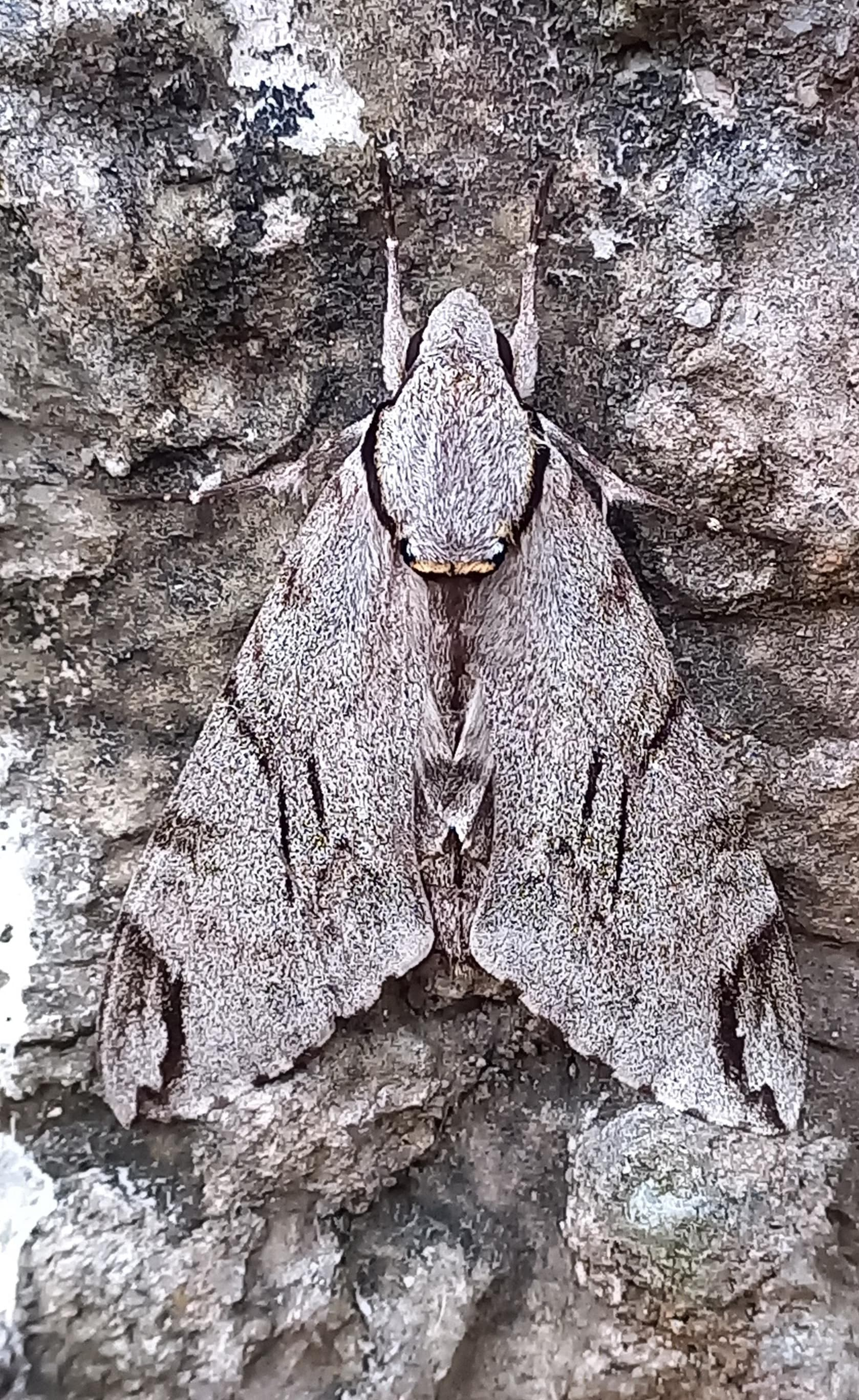

Scientific classification
- Kingdom: Animalia
- Phylum: Arthropoda
- Class: Insecta
- Order: Lepidoptera
- Family: Sphingidae
- Genus: Psilogramma
- Species: P. vates

Binomial name
- Psilogramma vates (Butler, 1875)

Synonyms
- Diludia vates Butler, 1875

= Psilogramma vates =

Species of moth

Psilogramma vates is a moth of the family Sphingidae. It is known from Sri Lanka.
