= Psilogramma koalae =

Scientific classification
- Kingdom: Animalia
- Phylum: Arthropoda
- Clade: Pancrustacea
- Class: Insecta
- Order: Lepidoptera
- Family: Sphingidae
- Genus: Psilogramma
- Species: P. koalae

Binomial name
- Psilogramma koalae Eitschberger, 2001

Species of moth endemic to Australia

Psilogramma koalae is a moth of the family Sphingidae. It is known from Queensland, Australia.
