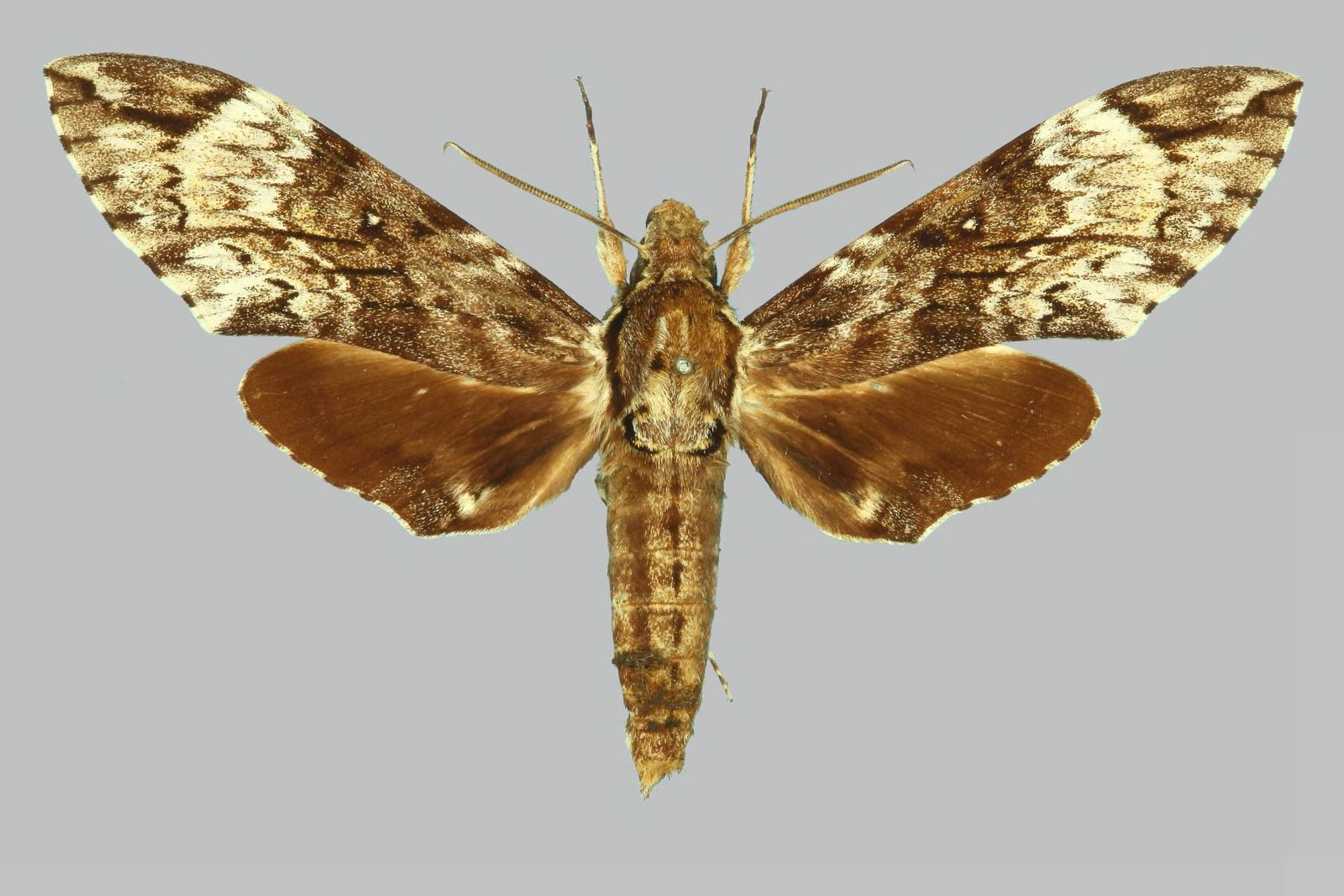

Scientific classification
- Kingdom: Animalia
- Phylum: Arthropoda
- Class: Insecta
- Order: Lepidoptera
- Family: Sphingidae
- Genus: Psilogramma
- Species: P. tanimbarica

Binomial name
- Psilogramma tanimbarica Brechlin, 2001

Synonyms
- Psilogramma karui Eitschberger, 2001; Psilogramma karui babariensis Eitschberger, 2010

= Psilogramma tanimbarica =

Species of moth

Psilogramma tanimbarica is a moth of the family Sphingidae. It is known from Indonesia.

== Subspecies ==
- Psilogramma tanimbarica tanimbarica (Tenimber)
- Psilogramma tanimbarica babariensis (Eitschberger, 2010) (Babar Archipelago)
