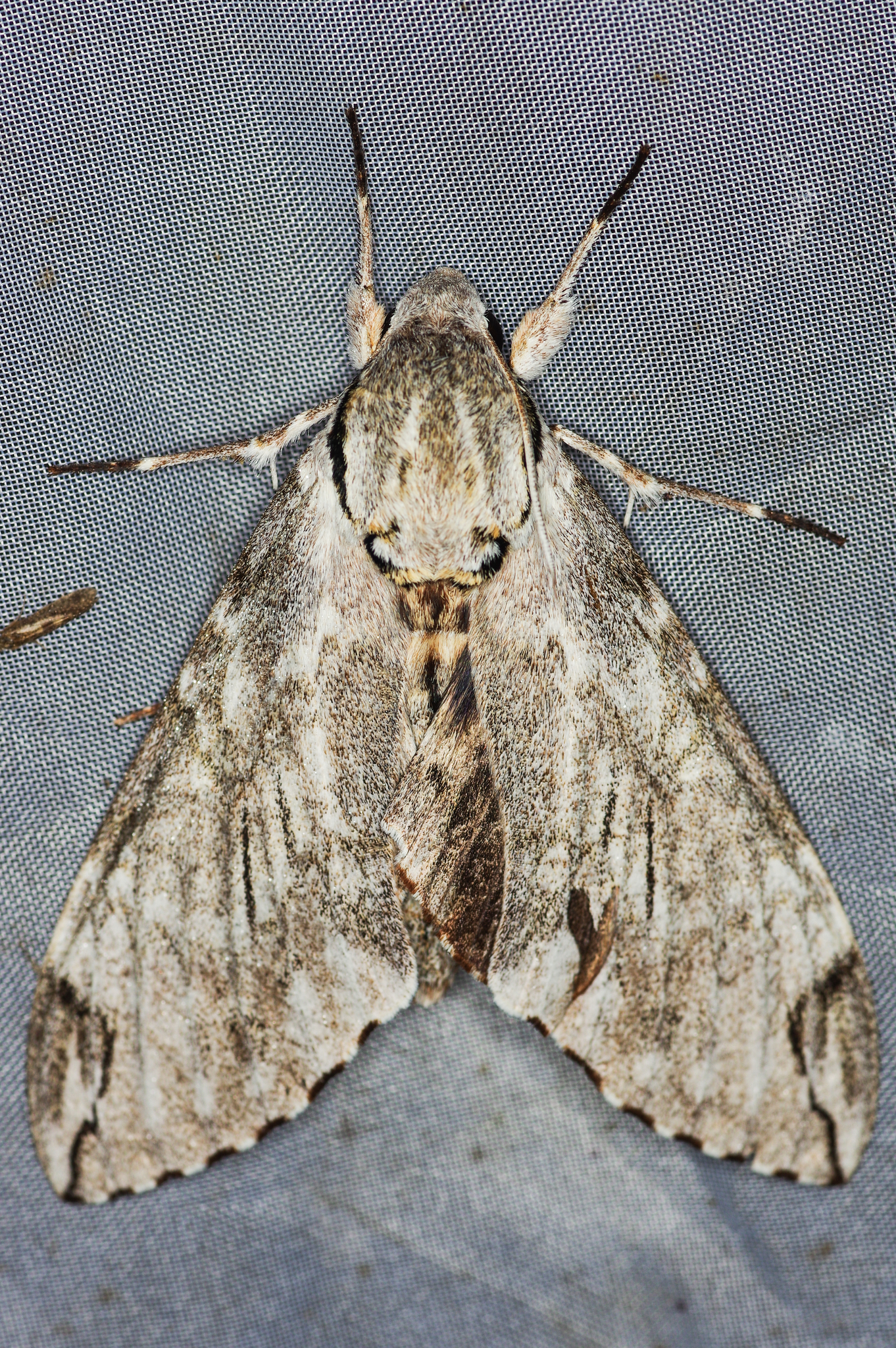

Scientific classification
- Kingdom: Animalia
- Phylum: Arthropoda
- Clade: Pancrustacea
- Class: Insecta
- Order: Lepidoptera
- Family: Sphingidae
- Genus: Psilogramma
- Species: P. lifuense

Binomial name
- Psilogramma lifuense (Rothschild, 1894)

Synonyms
- Meganoton lifuense Rothschild, 1894

= Psilogramma lifuense =

Species of moth

Psilogramma lifuense is a moth of the family Sphingidae. It is known from the Loyalty Islands.

It is a pale species, some specimens are nearly all white on the thorax and forewing. There are thin black discal streaks on the forewing upperside, often partly or totally obsolete. There is no distinct medio-costal brown area even in dark specimens. In dark specimens, the discal lines are pronounced; in pale ones the markings, including the proximal part of the apical black line, become indistinct.
