= Peridaedala speculata =

Scientific classification
- Kingdom: Animalia
- Phylum: Arthropoda
- Class: Insecta
- Order: Lepidoptera
- Family: Tortricidae
- Genus: Peridaedala
- Species: P. speculata

Binomial name
- Peridaedala speculata Razowski, 2013

Species of moth

Peridaedala speculata is a species of moth of the family Tortricidae first described by Józef Razowski in 2013. It is found on Seram Island in Indonesia. The habitat consists of upper montane forests.

The wingspan is about 17 mm.
