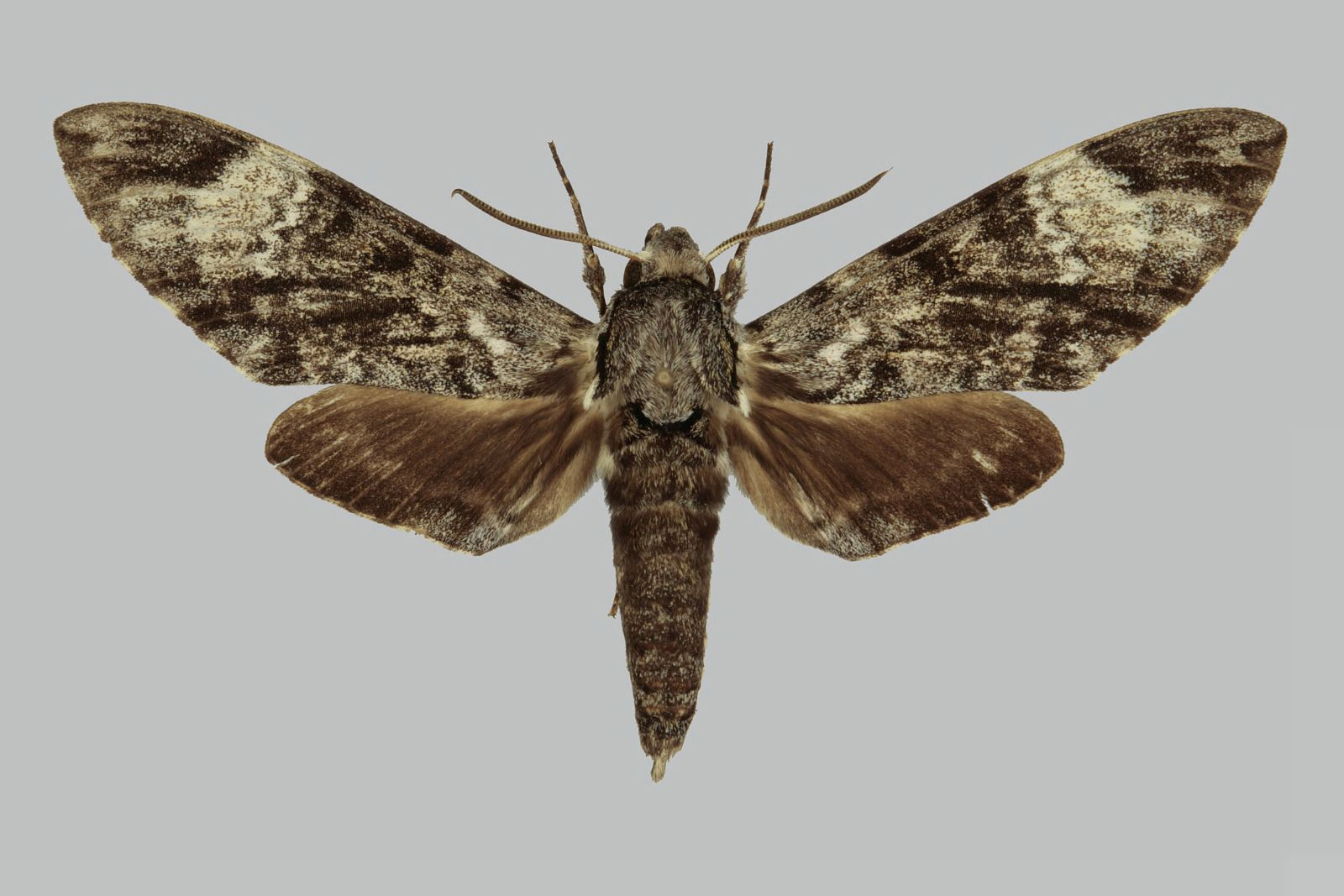

Scientific classification
- Kingdom: Animalia
- Phylum: Arthropoda
- Class: Insecta
- Order: Lepidoptera
- Family: Sphingidae
- Genus: Psilogramma
- Species: P. floresica

Binomial name
- Psilogramma floresica Brechlin, 2001

= Psilogramma floresica =

Species of moth

Psilogramma floresica is a moth of the family Sphingidae. It is known from Flores in Indonesia.
