= Psilogramma wernerbacki =

Scientific classification
- Kingdom: Animalia
- Phylum: Arthropoda
- Class: Insecta
- Order: Lepidoptera
- Family: Sphingidae
- Genus: Psilogramma
- Species: P. wernerbacki

Binomial name
- Psilogramma wernerbacki Eitschberger, 2010

Species of moth

Psilogramma wernerbacki is a moth of the family Sphingidae. It is known from the Solomon Islands.
