= Psilogramma exigua =

Scientific classification
- Kingdom: Animalia
- Phylum: Arthropoda
- Clade: Pancrustacea
- Class: Insecta
- Order: Lepidoptera
- Family: Sphingidae
- Genus: Psilogramma
- Species: P. exigua

Binomial name
- Psilogramma exigua Brechlin, Lane & Kitching, 2010

Species of moth

Psilogramma exigua is a moth of the family Sphingidae. It is known from western Australia.
