= Psilogramma macromera =

Scientific classification
- Domain: Eukaryota
- Kingdom: Animalia
- Phylum: Arthropoda
- Class: Insecta
- Order: Lepidoptera
- Family: Sphingidae
- Genus: Psilogramma
- Species: P. macromera

Binomial name
- Psilogramma macromera (Butler, 1882)

Synonyms
- Diludia macromera Butler, 1882

Species of moth

Psilogramma macromera is a moth of the family Sphingidae. It is known from Malaysia.
