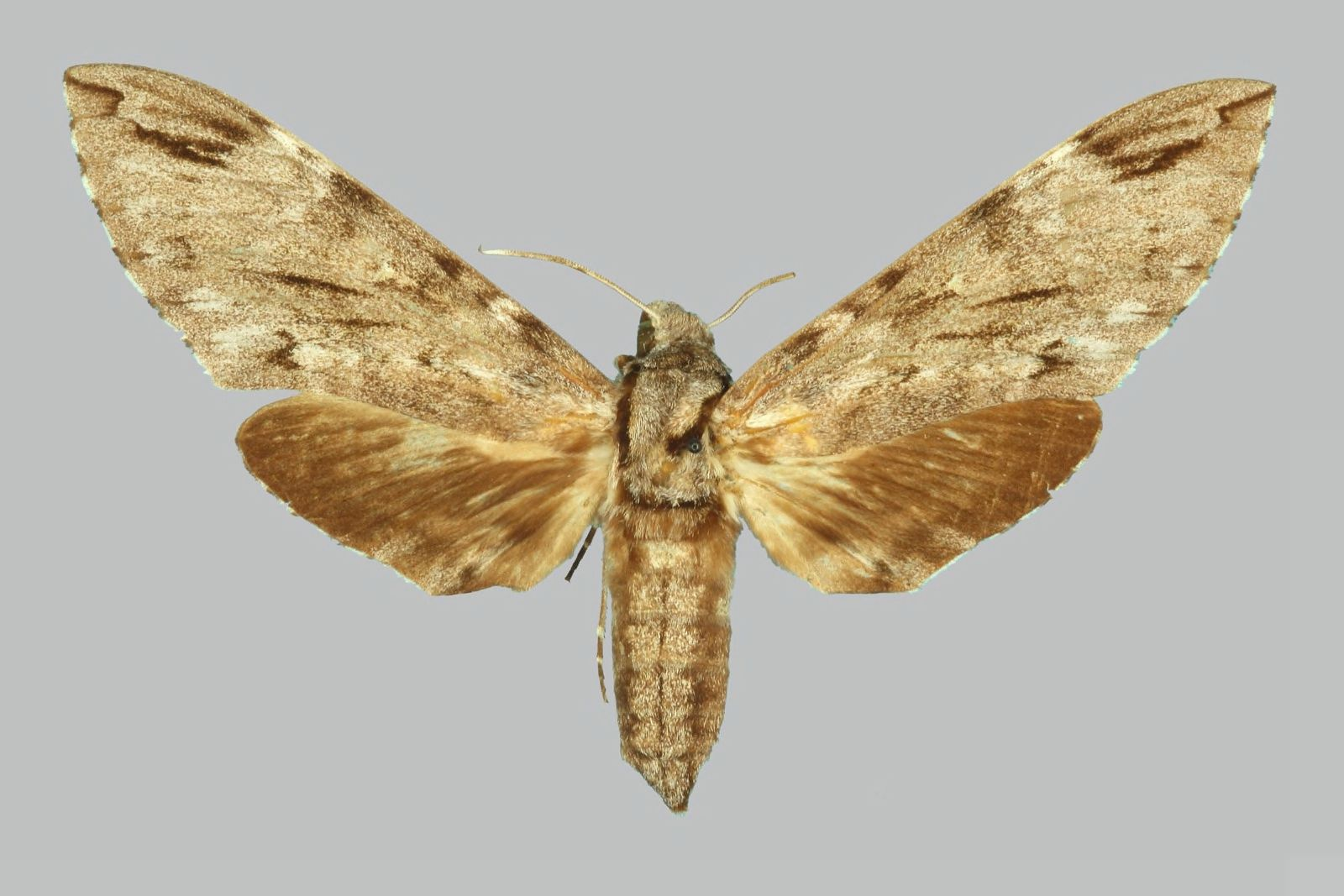

Scientific classification
- Kingdom: Animalia
- Phylum: Arthropoda
- Class: Insecta
- Order: Lepidoptera
- Family: Sphingidae
- Genus: Psilogramma
- Species: P. sundana

Binomial name
- Psilogramma sundana Brechlin, 2001

Synonyms
- Psilogramma gerstbergeri Eitschberger, 2001

= Psilogramma sundana =

Species of moth

Psilogramma sundana is a moth of the family Sphingidae. It is known from the Sunda Islands in Indonesia.
