= Psilogramma danneri =

Scientific classification
- Kingdom: Animalia
- Phylum: Arthropoda
- Class: Insecta
- Order: Lepidoptera
- Family: Sphingidae
- Genus: Psilogramma
- Species: P. danneri

Binomial name
- Psilogramma danneri Eitschberger, 2001

Species of moth

Psilogramma danneri is a moth of the family Sphingidae. It is known from Uttar Pradesh in India.
