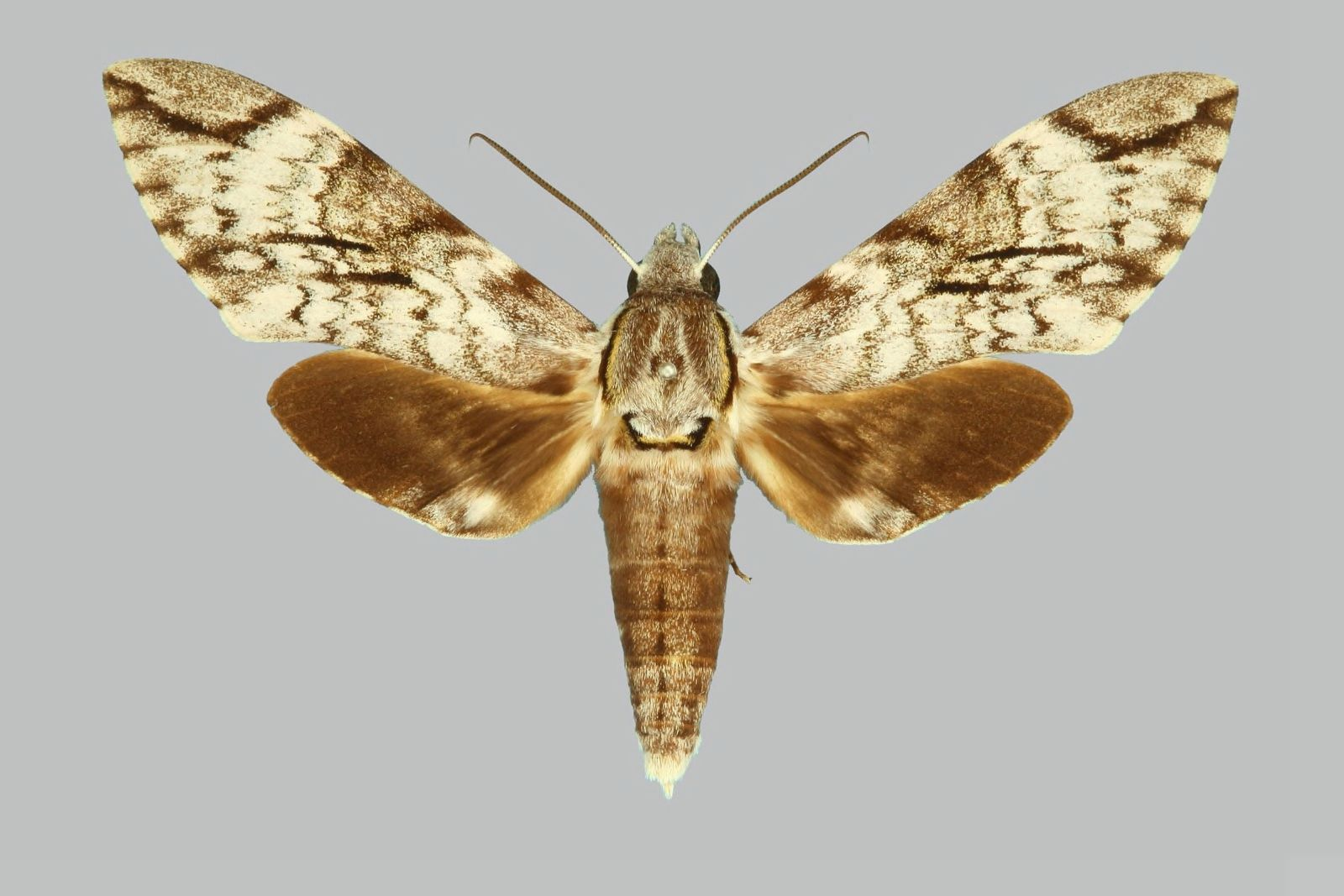

Scientific classification
- Kingdom: Animalia
- Phylum: Arthropoda
- Class: Insecta
- Order: Lepidoptera
- Family: Sphingidae
- Genus: Psilogramma
- Species: P. kitchingi

Binomial name
- Psilogramma kitchingi Brechlin & Lachlan, 2001

Synonyms
- Psilogramma wernerwolfi Eitschberger, 2001

= Psilogramma kitchingi =

Species of moth

Psilogramma kitchingi is a moth of the family Sphingidae. It is known from Papua New Guinea.
