= Peridaedala stenygra =

Scientific classification
- Kingdom: Animalia
- Phylum: Arthropoda
- Class: Insecta
- Order: Lepidoptera
- Family: Tortricidae
- Genus: Peridaedala
- Species: P. stenygra

Binomial name
- Peridaedala stenygra Razowski, 2013

Species of moth

Peridaedala stenygra is a species of moth of the family Tortricidae first described by Józef Razowski in 2013. It is found on Seram Island in Indonesia. The habitat consists of secondary forests.

The wingspan is about 20 mm.
