= Psilogramma penumbra =

Scientific classification
- Kingdom: Animalia
- Phylum: Arthropoda
- Clade: Pancrustacea
- Class: Insecta
- Order: Lepidoptera
- Family: Sphingidae
- Genus: Psilogramma
- Species: P. penumbra

Binomial name
- Psilogramma penumbra Lane, Moulds & Tuttle, 2011

Species of moth

Psilogramma penumbra is a moth of the family Sphingidae. It is known from the Northern Territory and Western Australia.
