= Psilogramma vanuatui =

Scientific classification
- Kingdom: Animalia
- Phylum: Arthropoda
- Class: Insecta
- Order: Lepidoptera
- Family: Sphingidae
- Genus: Psilogramma
- Species: P. vanuatui

Binomial name
- Psilogramma vanuatui Eitschberger & Schmidl, 2007

Species of moth

Psilogramma vanuatui is a moth of the family Sphingidae. It is known from Vanuatu.
