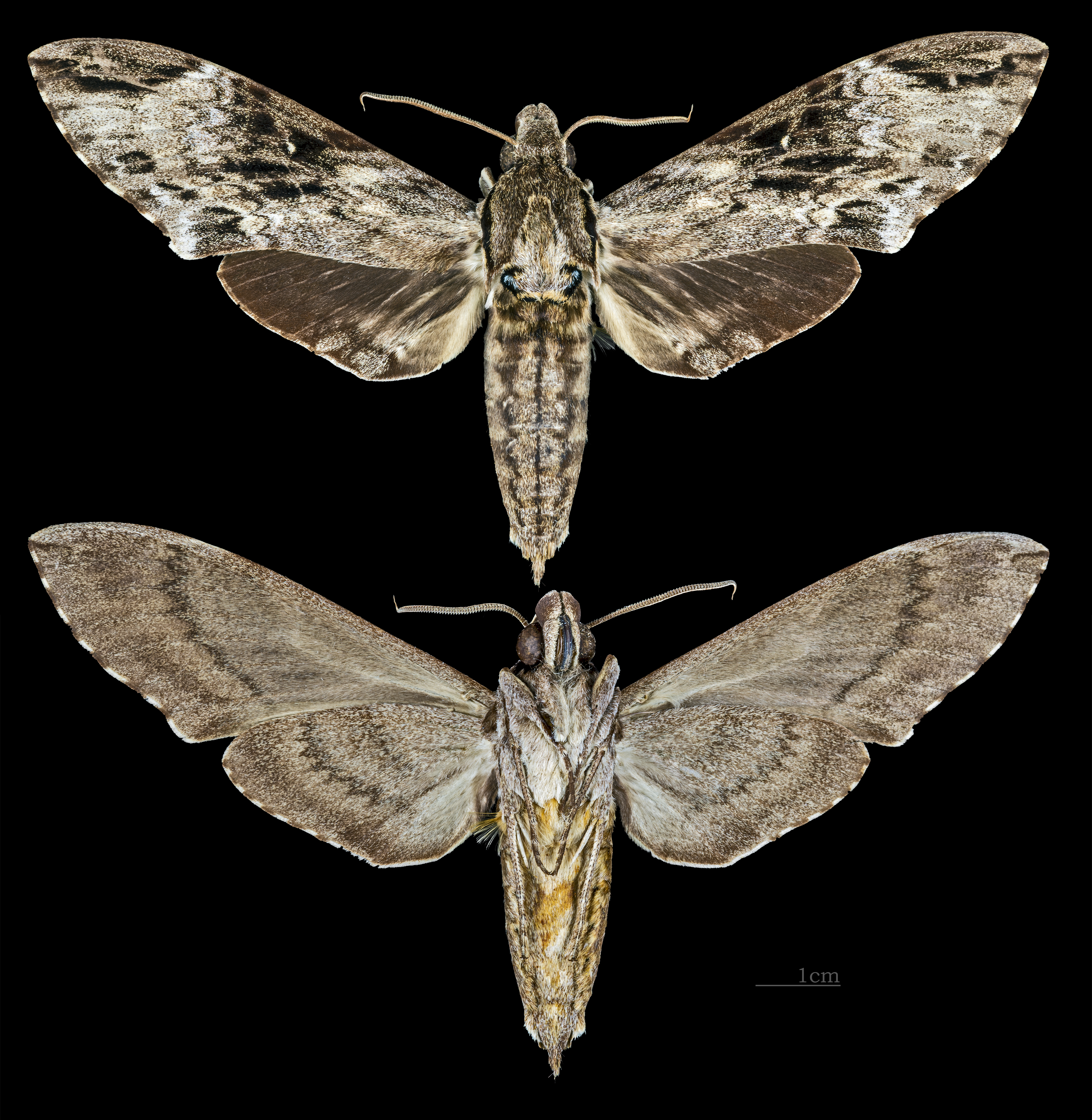

Scientific classification
- Domain: Eukaryota
- Kingdom: Animalia
- Phylum: Arthropoda
- Class: Insecta
- Order: Lepidoptera
- Family: Sphingidae
- Tribe: Sphingini
- Genus: Psilogramma; Rothschild & Jordan, 1903

Species
- See text

= Psilogramma =

Genus of moths

Psilogramma is a genus of moths in the family Sphingidae.

== Species ==
- Psilogramma andamanica Brechlin, 2001
- Psilogramma angelika Eitschberger, 2004
- Psilogramma anne Eitschberger, 2001
- Psilogramma argos Moulds & Lane, 1999
- Psilogramma bartschereri Eitschberger, 2001
- Psilogramma baueri Eitschberger, 2001
- Psilogramma casuarinae (Walker, 1856)
- Psilogramma choui Eitschberger, 2001
- Psilogramma danneri Eitschberger, 2001
- Psilogramma dantchenkoi Eitschberger, 2001
- Psilogramma dillerorum Eitschberger, 2001
- Psilogramma discistriga (Walker, 1856)
- Psilogramma edii Eitschberger, 2001
- Psilogramma exigua Brechlin, Lane & Kitching, 2010
- Psilogramma floresica Brechlin, 2001
- Psilogramma frankenbachi Eitschberger, 2001
- Psilogramma gerstmeieri Eitschberger, 2001
- Psilogramma gloriosa Eitschberger, 2001
- Psilogramma hainanensis Eitschberger, 2001
- Psilogramma hauensteini Eitschberger, 2001
- Psilogramma hayati Eitschberger, 2004
- Psilogramma increta (Walker, 1865)
- Psilogramma japonica Eitschberger, 2001
- Psilogramma joachimi (Clark, 1926)
- Psilogramma jordana Bethune-Baker, 1905
- Psilogramma kitchingi Brechlin & Lachlan, 2001
- Psilogramma kleineri Eitschberger, 2001
- Psilogramma koalae Eitschberger, 2001
- Psilogramma lifuense (Rothschild, 1894)
- Psilogramma lukhtanovi Eitschberger, 2001
- Psilogramma macromera (Butler, 1882)
- Psilogramma makirae Brechlin & Kitching, 2010
- Psilogramma mandarina Eitschberger, 2001
- Psilogramma manusensis Brechlin & Kitching, 2010
- Psilogramma maxmouldsi Eitschberger, 2001
- Psilogramma medicieloi Eitschberger, 2001
- Psilogramma menephron (Cramer, 1780)
- Psilogramma monastyrskii Eitschberger, 2001
- Psilogramma nebulosa Butler, 1876
- Psilogramma orientalis Brechlin, 2001
- Psilogramma papuensis Brechlin, 2001
- Psilogramma paukstadtorum Eitschberger, 2001
- Psilogramma penumbra Lane, Moulds & Tuttle, 2011
- Psilogramma reinhardti Eitschberger, 2001
- Psilogramma renneri Eitschberger, 2001
- Psilogramma rupprechtorum Eitschberger, 2001
- Psilogramma salomonis Brechlin, 2001
- Psilogramma stameri Eitschberger, 2001
- Psilogramma sulawesica Brechlin, 2001
- Psilogramma sundana Brechlin, 2001
- Psilogramma surholti Eitschberger, 2001
- Psilogramma tanimbarica Brechlin, 2001
- Psilogramma timorica Brechlin & Kitching, 2010
- Psilogramma ulrichroesleri Eitschberger, 2004
- Psilogramma vanuatui Eitschberger & Schmidl, 2007
- Psilogramma vates (Butler, 1875)
- Psilogramma villani Kitching, Treadaway & Hogenes, 2000
- Psilogramma wannanensis Meng, 1990
- Psilogramma wernerbacki Eitschberger, 2010
- Psilogramma wetarensis Brechlin, 2001
- Psilogramma yilingae Eitschberger, 2001
