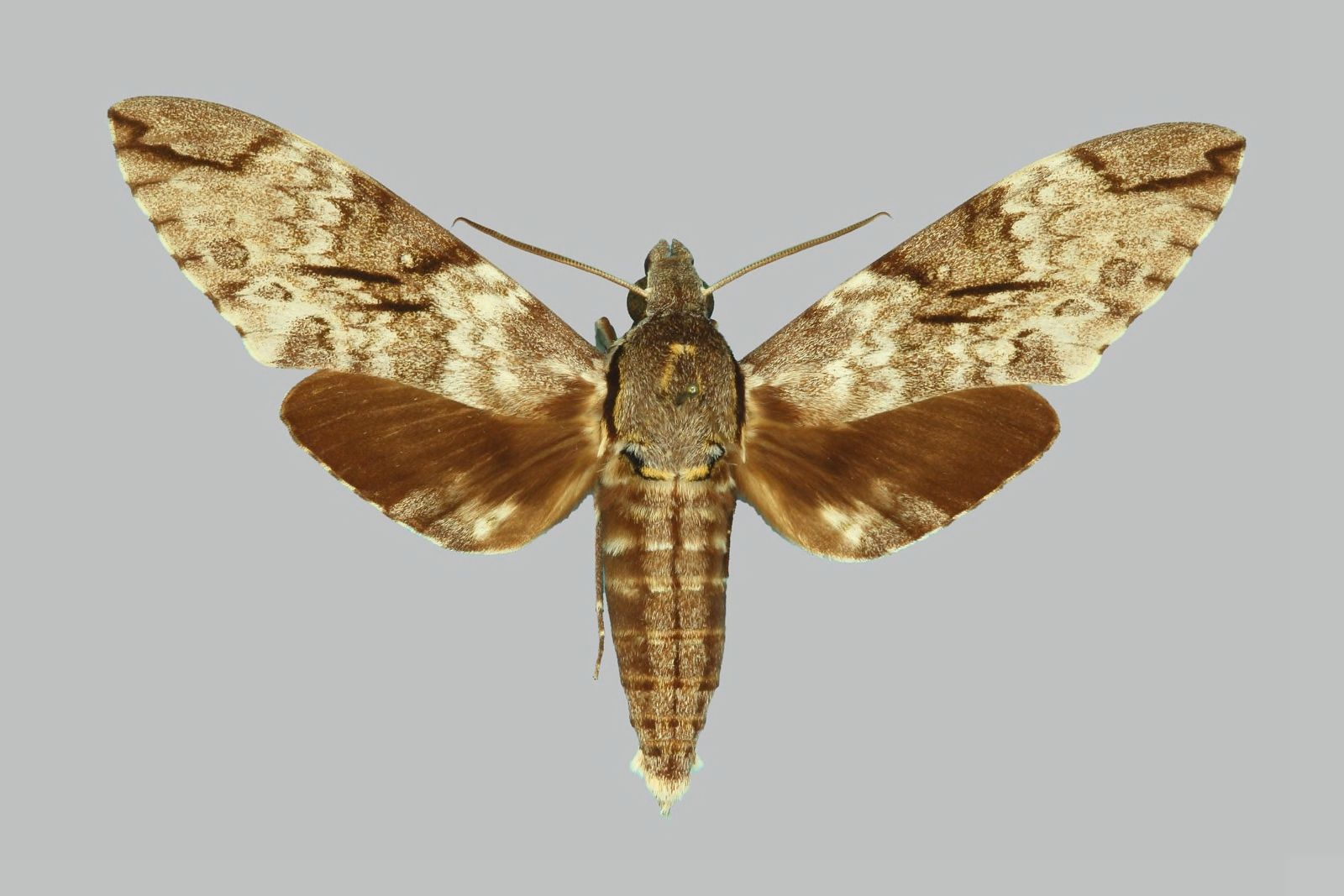
- Psilogramma papuensis papuensis

Scientific classification
- Kingdom: Animalia
- Phylum: Arthropoda
- Class: Insecta
- Order: Lepidoptera
- Family: Sphingidae
- Genus: Psilogramma
- Species: P. papuensis

Binomial name
- Psilogramma papuensis Brechlin, 2001

Synonyms
- Psilogramma mastrigti Eitschberger, 2001; Psilogramma menephron fasciata Closs, 1916

= Psilogramma papuensis =

Species of moth

Psilogramma papuensis is a moth of the family Sphingidae. It is known from New Guinea and north-eastern Australia.

== Subspecies ==
- Psilogramma papuensis papuensis (New Guinea and north-eastern Australia)
- Psilogramma papuensis aruensis Eitschberger, 2004 (Aru Archipelago)
