= Psilogramma stameri =

Scientific classification
- Kingdom: Animalia
- Phylum: Arthropoda
- Clade: Pancrustacea
- Class: Insecta
- Order: Lepidoptera
- Family: Sphingidae
- Genus: Psilogramma
- Species: P. stameri

Binomial name
- Psilogramma stameri Eitschberger, 2001

Species of moth

Psilogramma stameri is a moth of the family Sphingidae. It is known from Sumatra and Java in Indonesia.

== Subspecies ==
- Psilogramma stameri stameri (Sumatra)
- Psilogramma stameri chuai Eitschberger, 2001 (Java)
