= Psilogramma ulrichroesleri =

Scientific classification
- Kingdom: Animalia
- Phylum: Arthropoda
- Class: Insecta
- Order: Lepidoptera
- Family: Sphingidae
- Genus: Psilogramma
- Species: P. ulrichroesleri

Binomial name
- Psilogramma ulrichroesleri Eitschberger, 2004

Species of moth

Psilogramma ulrichroesleri is a moth of the family Sphingidae. It is known from Papua New Guinea.
