= Psilogramma joachimi =

Scientific classification
- Kingdom: Animalia
- Phylum: Arthropoda
- Class: Insecta
- Order: Lepidoptera
- Family: Sphingidae
- Genus: Psilogramma
- Species: P. joachimi

Binomial name
- Psilogramma joachimi (Clark, 1926)

Synonyms
- Meganoton joachimi Clark, 1926

Species of moth

Psilogramma joachimi is a moth of the family Sphingidae. It is known from Seram in Indonesia.
