= Psilogramma hayati =

Scientific classification
- Kingdom: Animalia
- Phylum: Arthropoda
- Class: Insecta
- Order: Lepidoptera
- Family: Sphingidae
- Genus: Psilogramma
- Species: P. hayati

Binomial name
- Psilogramma hayati Eitschberger, 2004

Species of moth

Psilogramma hayati is a moth of the family Sphingidae. It is known from the Moluccas in Indonesia.
