= Psilogramma japonica =

Scientific classification
- Kingdom: Animalia
- Phylum: Arthropoda
- Class: Insecta
- Order: Lepidoptera
- Family: Sphingidae
- Genus: Psilogramma
- Species: P. japonica

Binomial name
- Psilogramma japonica Eitschberger, 2001

Species of moth

Psilogramma japonica is a moth of the family Sphingidae. It is found in Japan.
