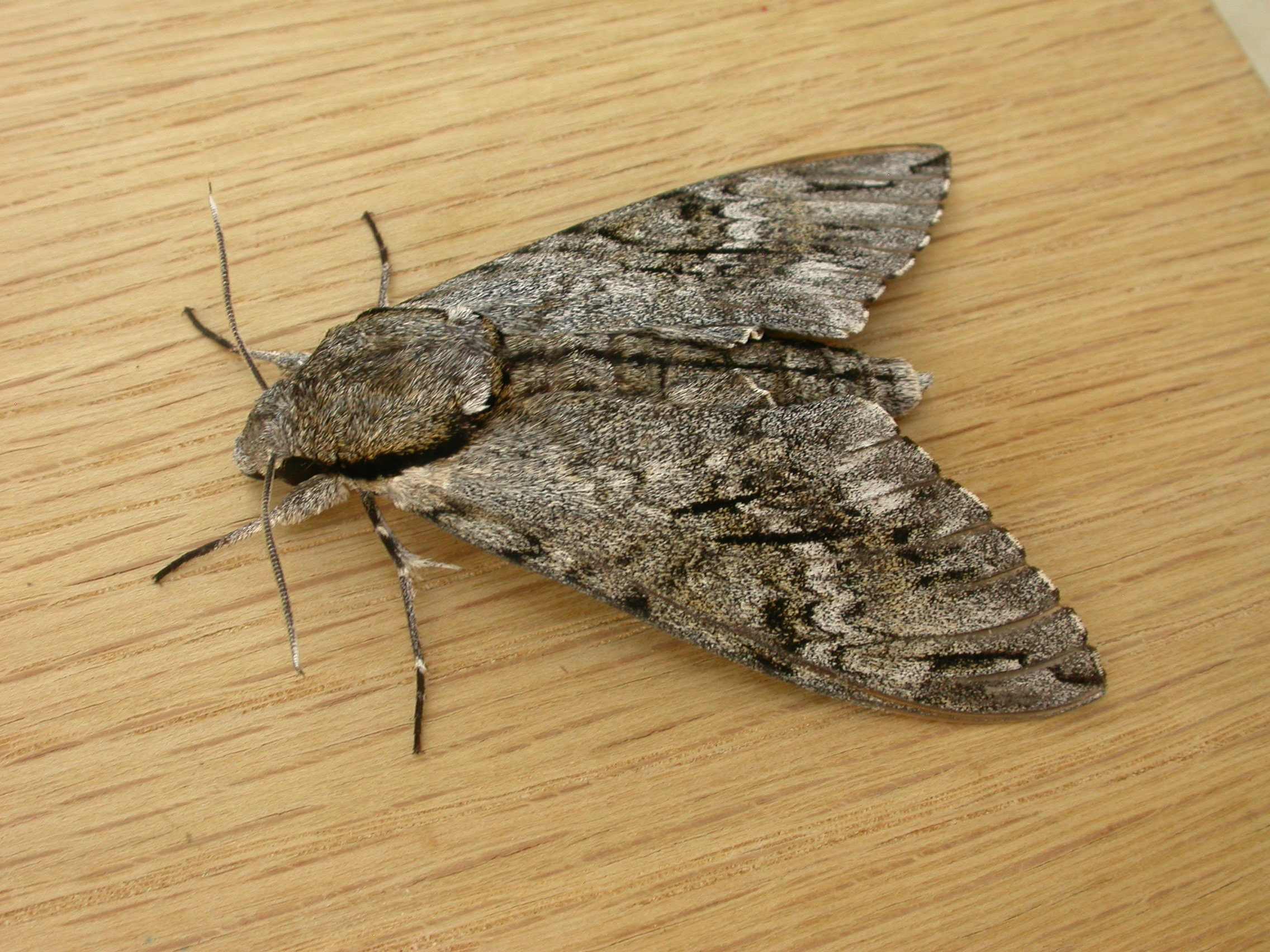

Scientific classification
- Kingdom: Animalia
- Phylum: Arthropoda
- Clade: Pancrustacea
- Class: Insecta
- Order: Lepidoptera
- Family: Sphingidae
- Genus: Psilogramma
- Species: P. casuarinae

Binomial name
- Psilogramma casuarinae (Walker, 1856)

Synonyms
- Macrosila casuarinae Walker, 1856; Psilogramma hausmanni Eitschberger, 2001

= Psilogramma casuarinae =

Australasian privet hawk moth

Species of moth

Psilogramma casuarinae, the Australasian privet hawk moth, is a moth of the family Sphingidae. The species was first described by Francis Walker in 1856. It is known from New South Wales, the Northern Territory and Queensland, all in Australia.

The larvae feed on Olea europaea, Ligustrum vulgare, Jasminum polyanthum, Campsis radicans, Tecoma stans, Lonicera japonica, Cotoneaster species, Antirrhinum majus and Clerodendrum paniculatum.

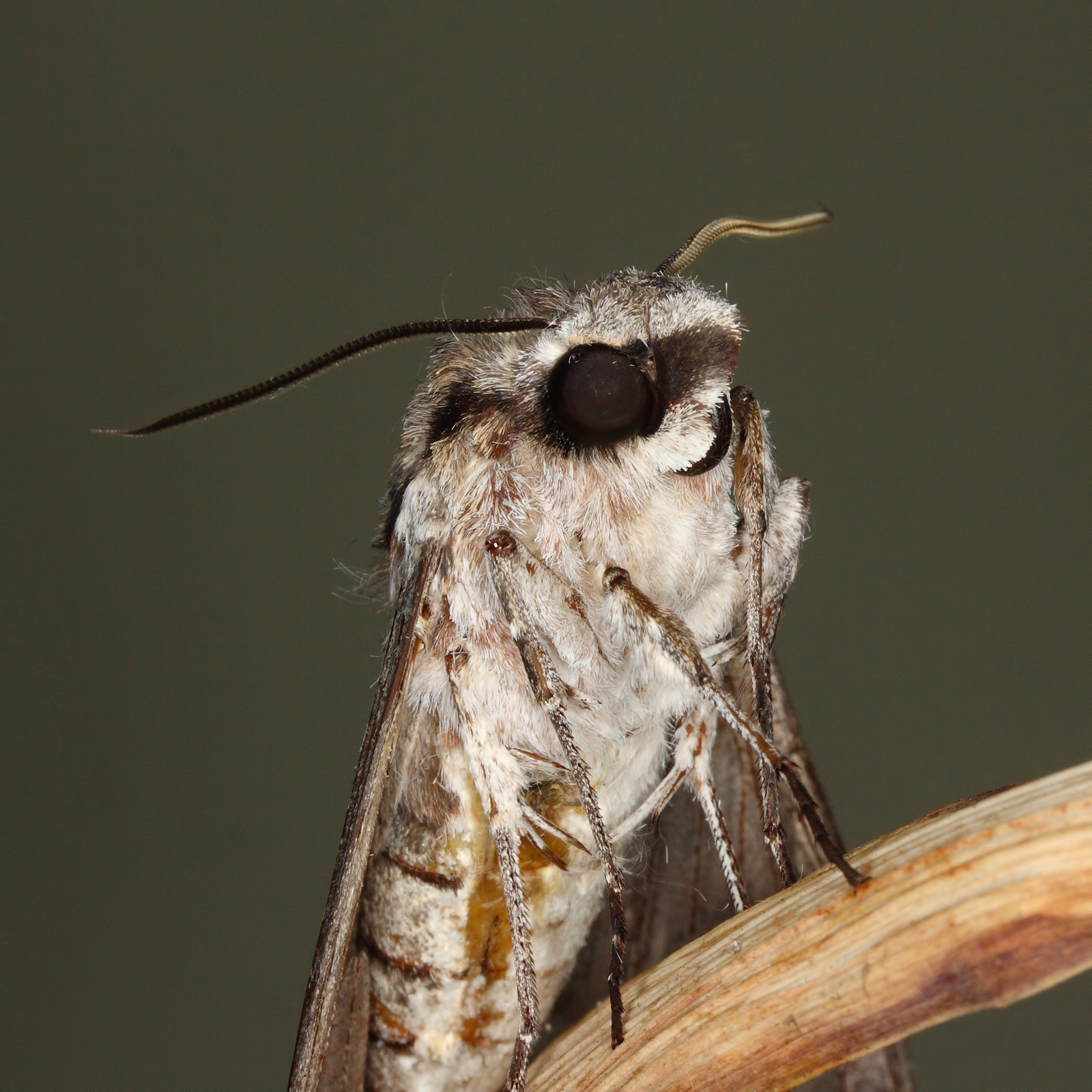
