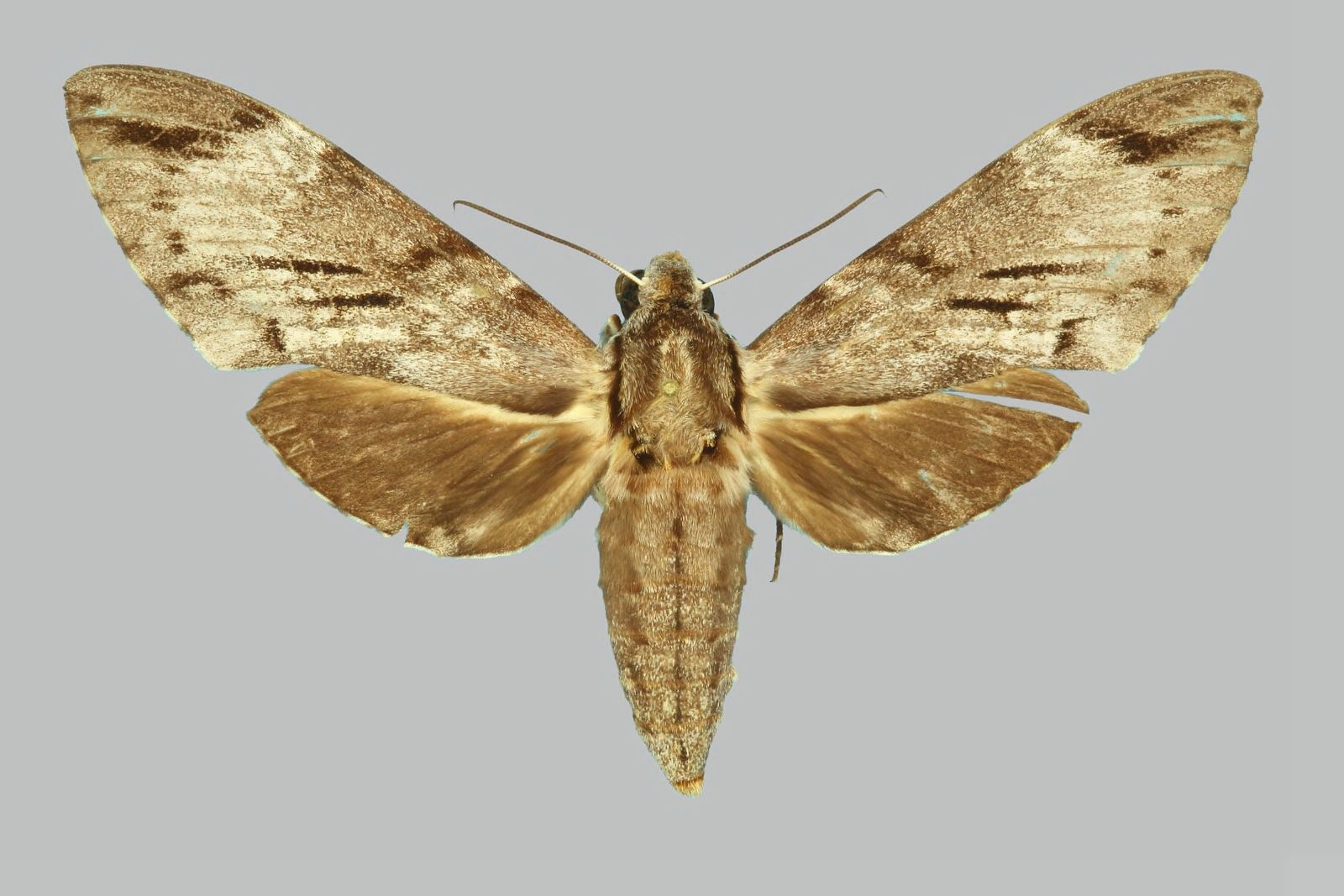

Scientific classification
- Kingdom: Animalia
- Phylum: Arthropoda
- Class: Insecta
- Order: Lepidoptera
- Family: Sphingidae
- Genus: Psilogramma
- Species: P. sulawesica

Binomial name
- Psilogramma sulawesica Brechlin, 2001

Synonyms
- Psilogramma milleri Eitschberger, 2001

= Psilogramma sulawesica =

Species of moth

Psilogramma sulawesica is a moth of the family Sphingidae. It is known from Sulawesi in Indonesia.
