= Peperomia japonica =

Scientific classification
- Kingdom: Plantae
- Clade: Tracheophytes
- Clade: Angiosperms
- Clade: Magnoliids
- Order: Piperales
- Family: Piperaceae
- Genus: Peperomia
- Species: P. japonica

Binomial name
- Peperomia japonica Makino

Synonyms
- Heterotypic Synonyms: Peperomia formosana C.DC.; Peperomia japonica f. glabra Hatus.; Peperomia japonica var. okinawensis (T.Yamaz.) Y.H.Kobay. & M.N.Tamura; Peperomia laticaulis C.DC.; Peperomia okinawensis T.Yamaz.

Species of plant

Peperomia japonica is a species of flowering plant in the family Piperaceae. Its native range includes South-Central China, Southeast China, Japan, Nansei-shoto, and Taiwan.
