= Peridaedala japonica =

Scientific classification
- Domain: Eukaryota
- Kingdom: Animalia
- Phylum: Arthropoda
- Class: Insecta
- Order: Lepidoptera
- Family: Tortricidae
- Genus: Peridaedala
- Species: P. japonica

Binomial name
- Peridaedala japonica Oku, 1979

Synonyms
- Assulella optabilana Kuznetsov, 1979

Species of moth

Peridaedala japonica is a species of moth of the family Tortricidae. It is found in Taiwan, Korea, Japan and the Russian Far East.
