= Philbertia japonica =

Scientific classification
- Kingdom: Animalia
- Phylum: Mollusca
- Class: Gastropoda
- Subclass: Caenogastropoda
- Order: Neogastropoda
- Superfamily: Conoidea
- Family: Raphitomidae
- Genus: Philbertia
- Species: P. japonica

Binomial name
- Philbertia japonica (Melvill, 1895)

Synonyms
- Defrancia japonica Melvill, 1895

Species of gastropod

Philbertia japonica is a species of sea snail, a marine gastropod mollusk in the family Raphitomidae.
