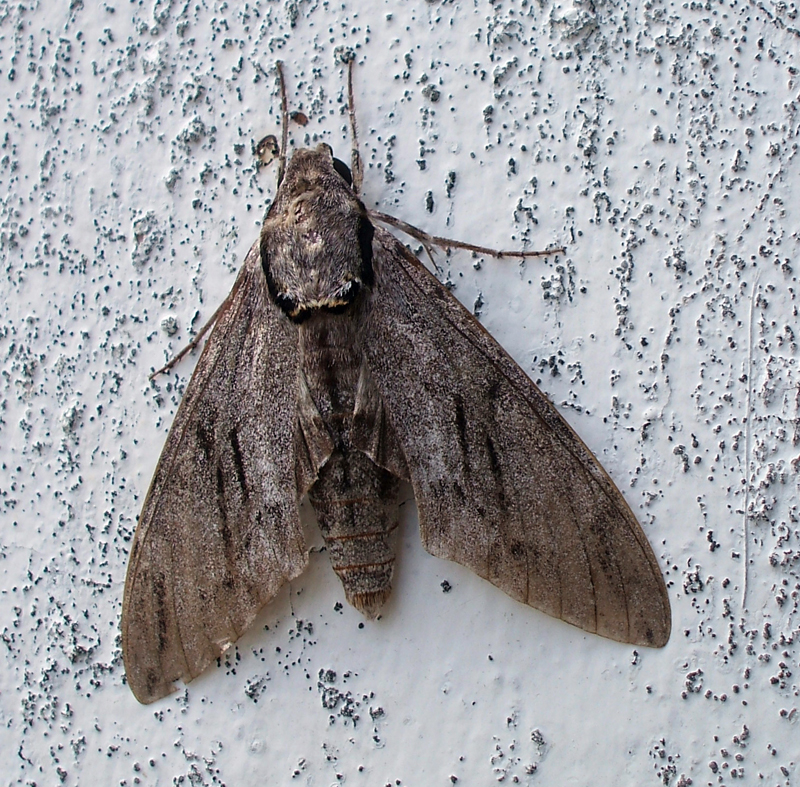
- Psilogramma increta

Scientific classification
- Kingdom: Animalia
- Phylum: Arthropoda
- Clade: Pancrustacea
- Class: Insecta
- Order: Lepidoptera
- Family: Sphingidae
- Genus: Psilogramma
- Species: P. increta

Binomial name
- Psilogramma increta (Walker 1865)

Synonyms
- Anceryx increta Walker, [1865]; Sphinx abietina Boisduval, 1875; Sphinx strobi Boisduval, 1868; Psilogramma increta montana (Mell, 1922); Psilogramma increta serrata Austaut, 1912; Psilogramma menephron eburnea Closs, 1911

= Psilogramma increta =

Species of moth

Psilogramma increta, the plain grey hawkmoth, is a moth of the family Sphingidae.

== Distribution ==
It is found from north-eastern China, Japan and Korea, south and east through China, Taiwan, Vietnam, Thailand, the Philippines and Peninsular Malaysia, to the Greater Sunda Islands, west through Myanmar, Nepal, Sri Lanka and India to Kashmir. It is an introduced species in Hawaii, and the Caribbean region.

== Description ==
The wingspan is 90–122 mm.

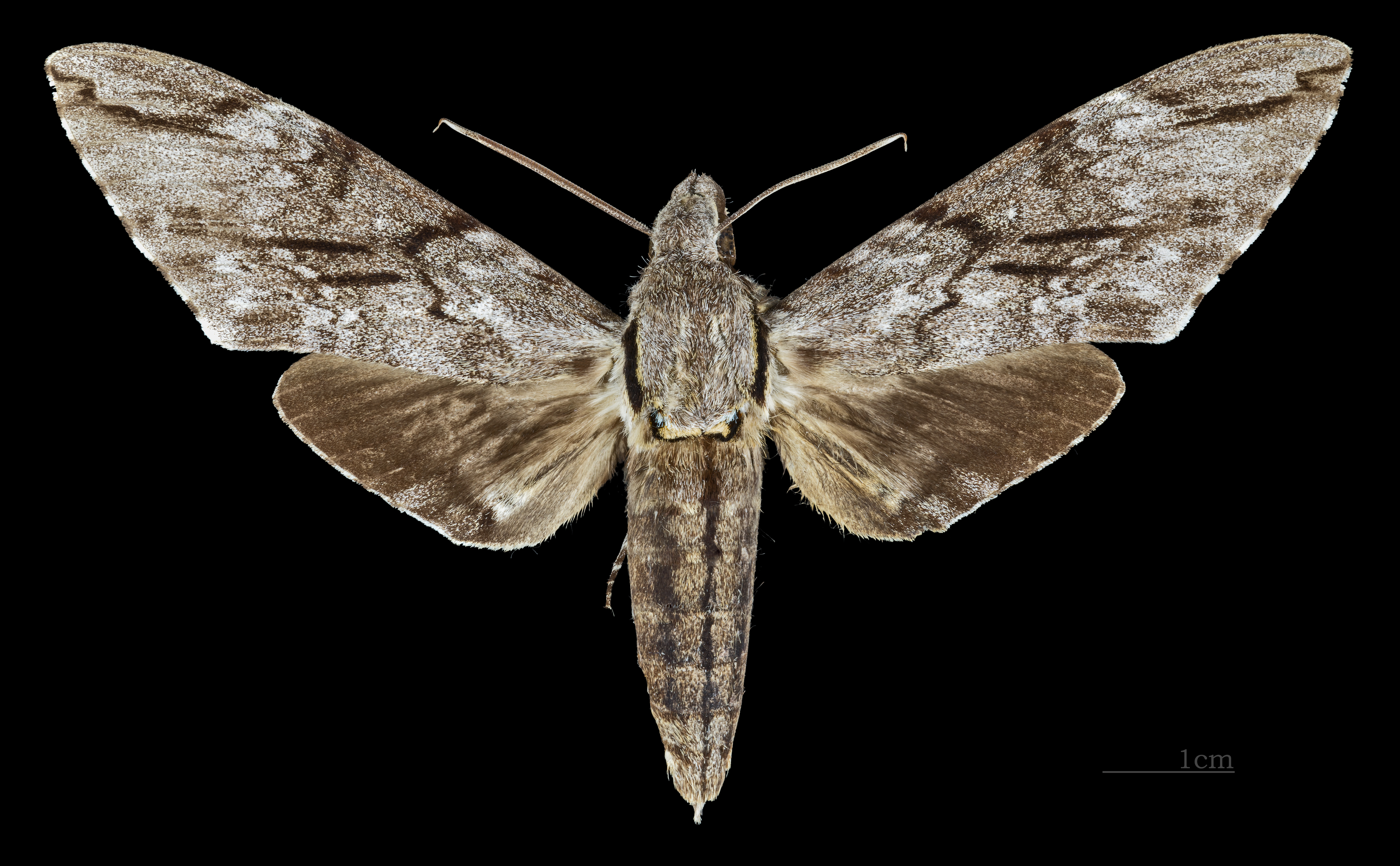
Psilogramma increta ♂

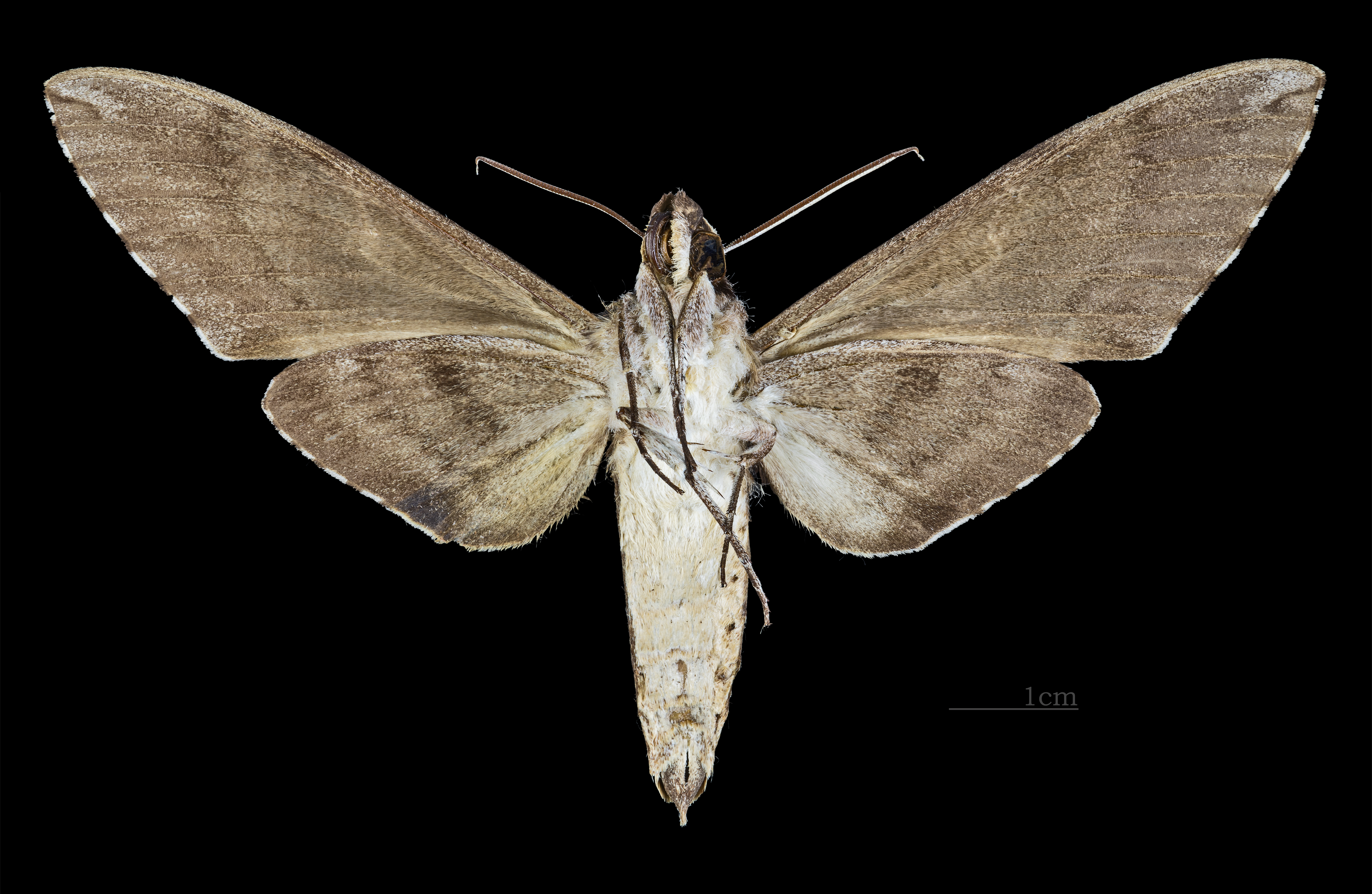
Psilogramma increta ♂ △

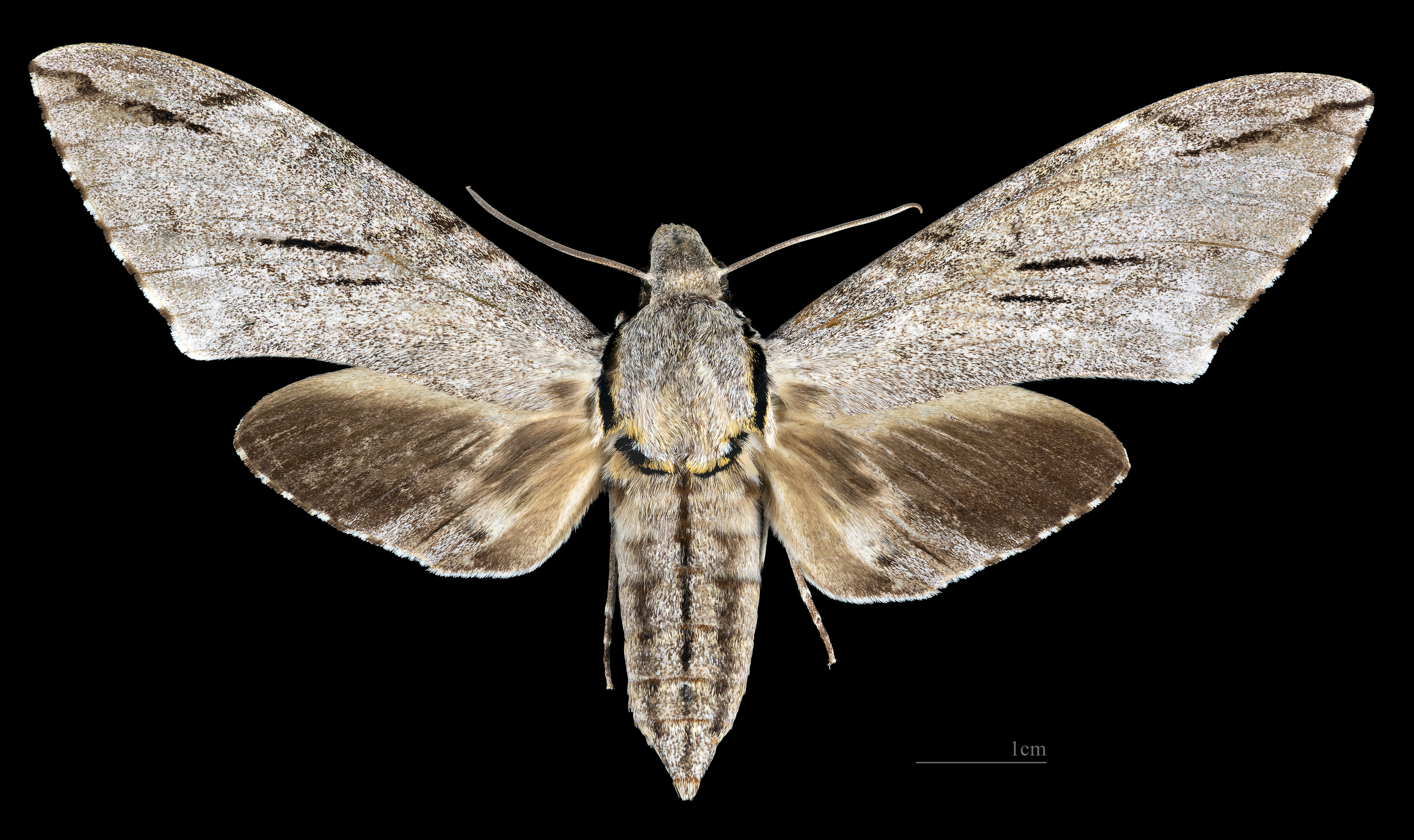
Psilogramma increta ♀

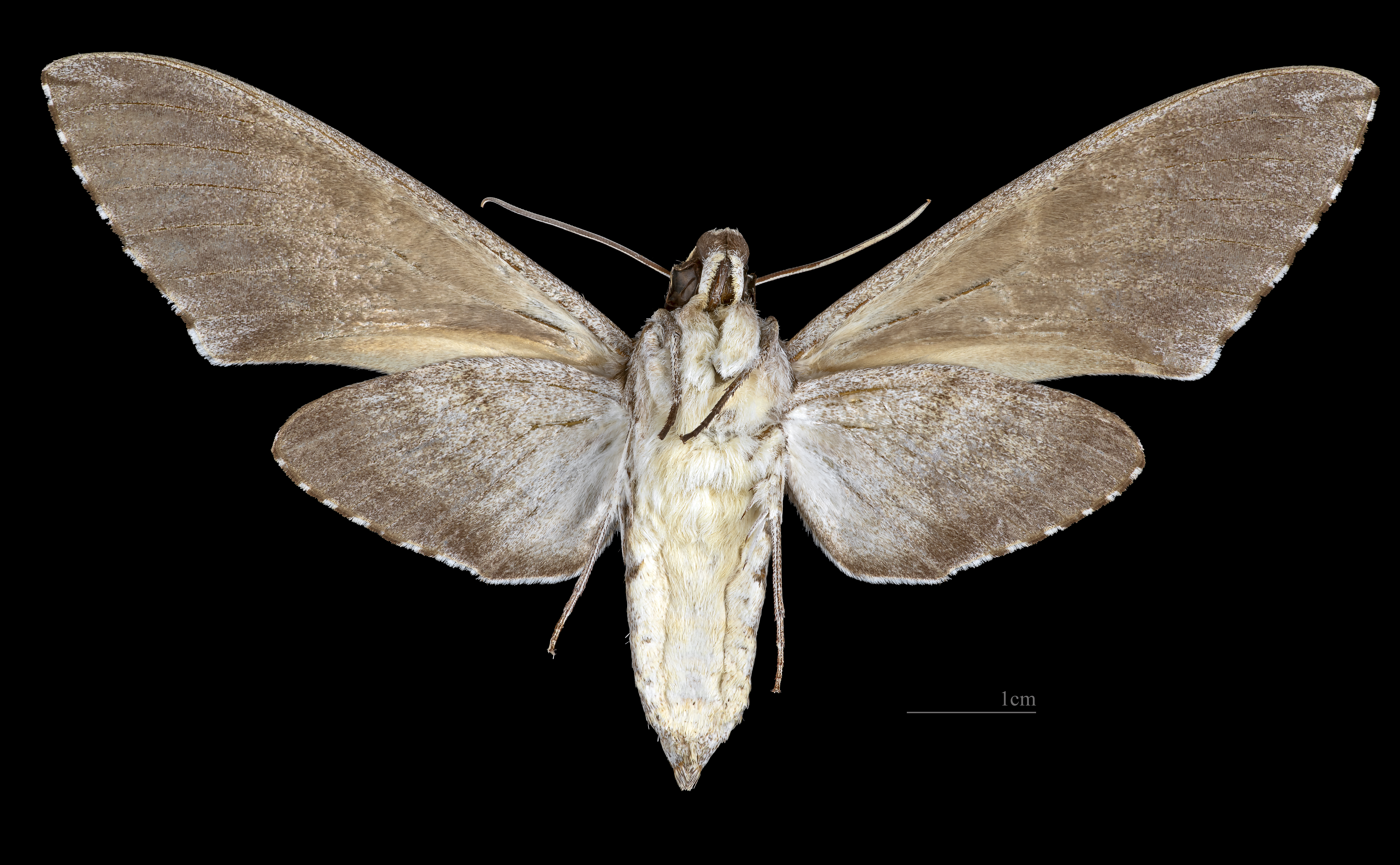
Psilogramma increta ♀ △

== Biology ==
The larvae mostly feed on Oleaceae, Scrophulariaceae and Verbenaceae species, although there are records from other families. Recorded food plants include Campsis, Catalpa, Clerodendrum (including Clerodendrum tricotonum), Dimocarpus, Firmiana, Fraxinus, Ligustrum (including Ligustrum lucidum, Ligustrum obtusifolium and Ligustrum japonicum), Melia, Meliosma, Olea, Osmanthus (including Osmanthus fragrans), Paulownia (including Paulownia tomentosa and Paulownia coreana), Syringa (including Syringa reticulata and Syringa dilatata), Vitex (including Vitex negundo), Quercus aliena, Callicarpa dichotoma, Sesamum indicum, Perilla frutescens and Viburnum dilatatum.

== Gallery ==
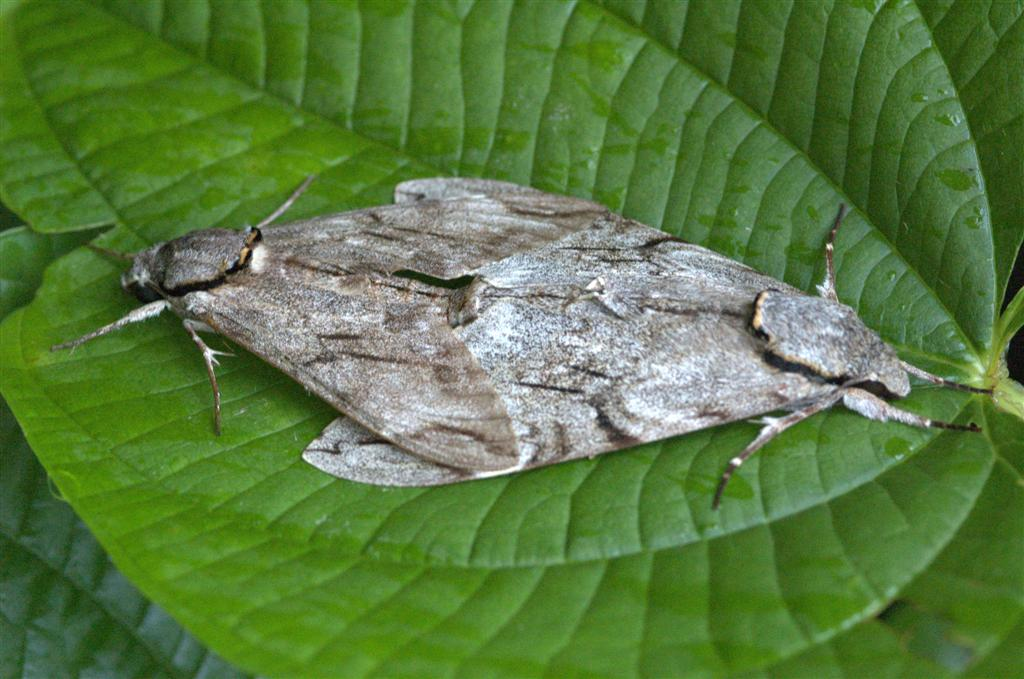
Mating pair in Thane, India

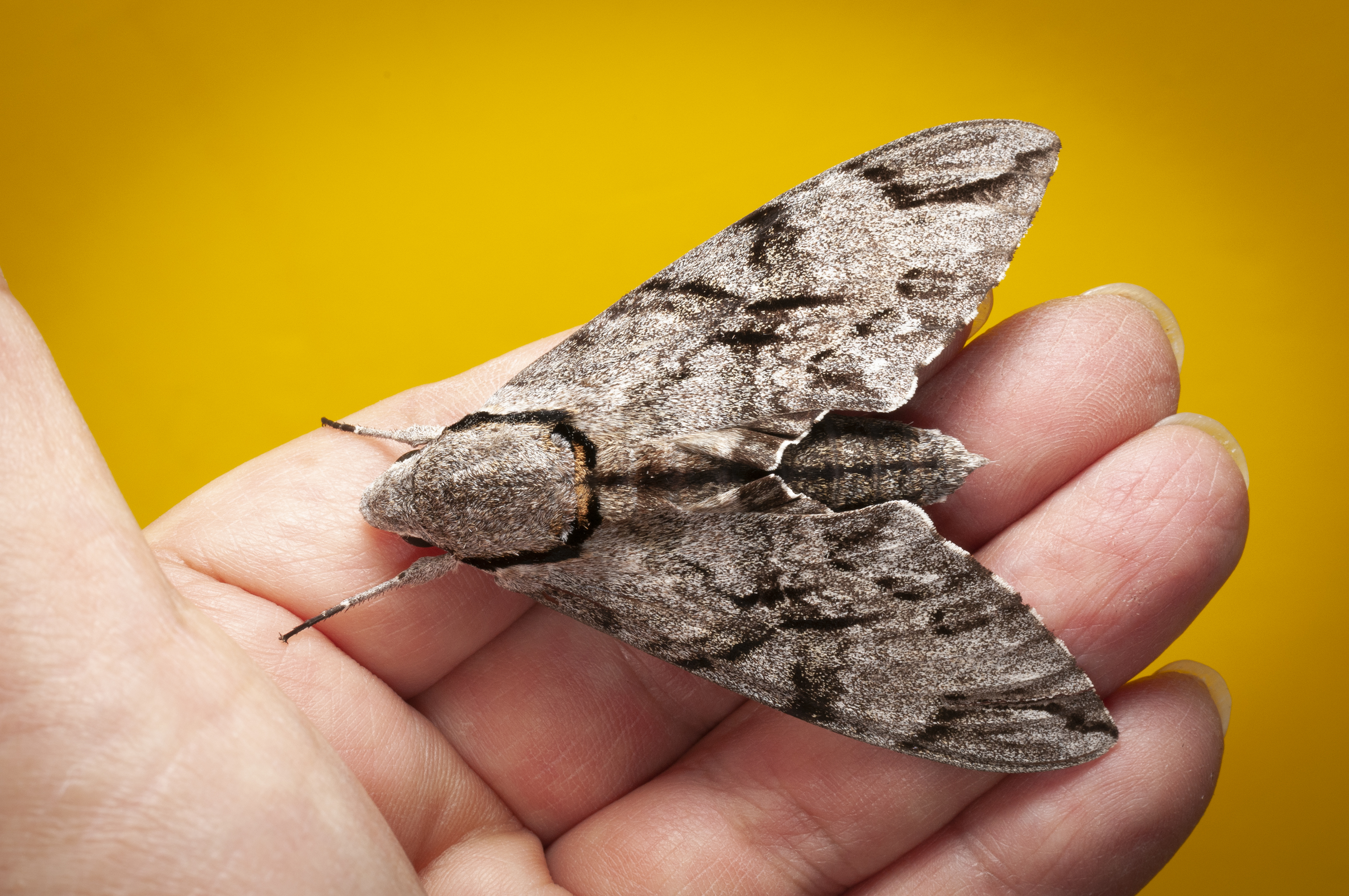
Psilogramma increta , Adult, South Korea
