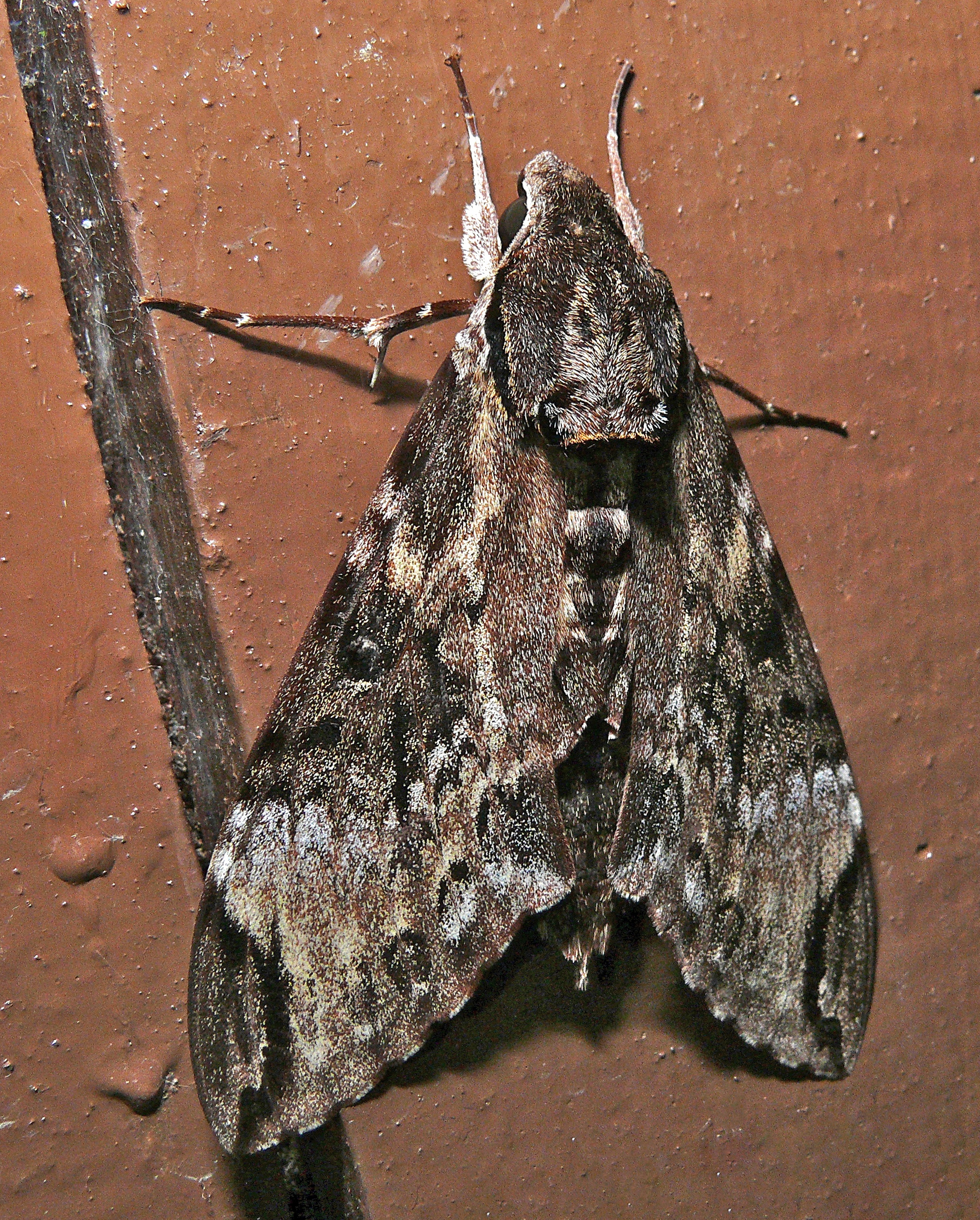

Scientific classification
- Domain: Eukaryota
- Kingdom: Animalia
- Phylum: Arthropoda
- Class: Insecta
- Order: Lepidoptera
- Family: Sphingidae
- Genus: Psilogramma
- Species: P. menephron

Binomial name
- Psilogramma menephron (Cramer, 1780)

Synonyms
- Sphinx menephron Cramer, [1780]; Sphinx menephron discistriga Walker, 1856; Psilogramma melanomera (Butler, 1875); Sphinx ahrendti Pagenstecher, 1888

= Psilogramma menephron =

Species of moth

Psilogramma menephron, the privet hawk moth or large brown hawkmoth, is a member of the family Sphingidae. It was described by Pieter Cramer in 1780. It is usually found in Sri Lanka, India (including the Andaman Islands), Nepal, central and southern China, Thailand, Vietnam, Indonesia and the Philippines. Psilogramma casuarinae from eastern Australia was long treated as a synonym but is now thought to be a distinct species. The introduced population on Hawaii was first thought to be P. menephron, but is Psilogramma increta.

== Description ==
The wingspan is 82–138 mm. Head, thorax, abdomen and forewings are grey. Dark brown bands along the sides of palpi and thorax meet on metathorax, where there are a few blue and yellow scales. A dark line runs down vertex of abdomen and paired more diffused subdorsal lines. Forewings with some dark strigae from the costa. There are two dark streaks in the interspaces below veins 2 and 3 and a dark streak down from the costa before the apex, curved down to vein 6, then upwards and bent back before reaching the apex. Hindwings are brownish with a pale patch with two dark lines across it near the anal angle. Ventral side is much paler with indistinct transverse lines. Larva greenish with white specks on the vertex of 1st, 2nd and 3rd somites. There are oblique white lateral stripes on 4th and 11th somites.

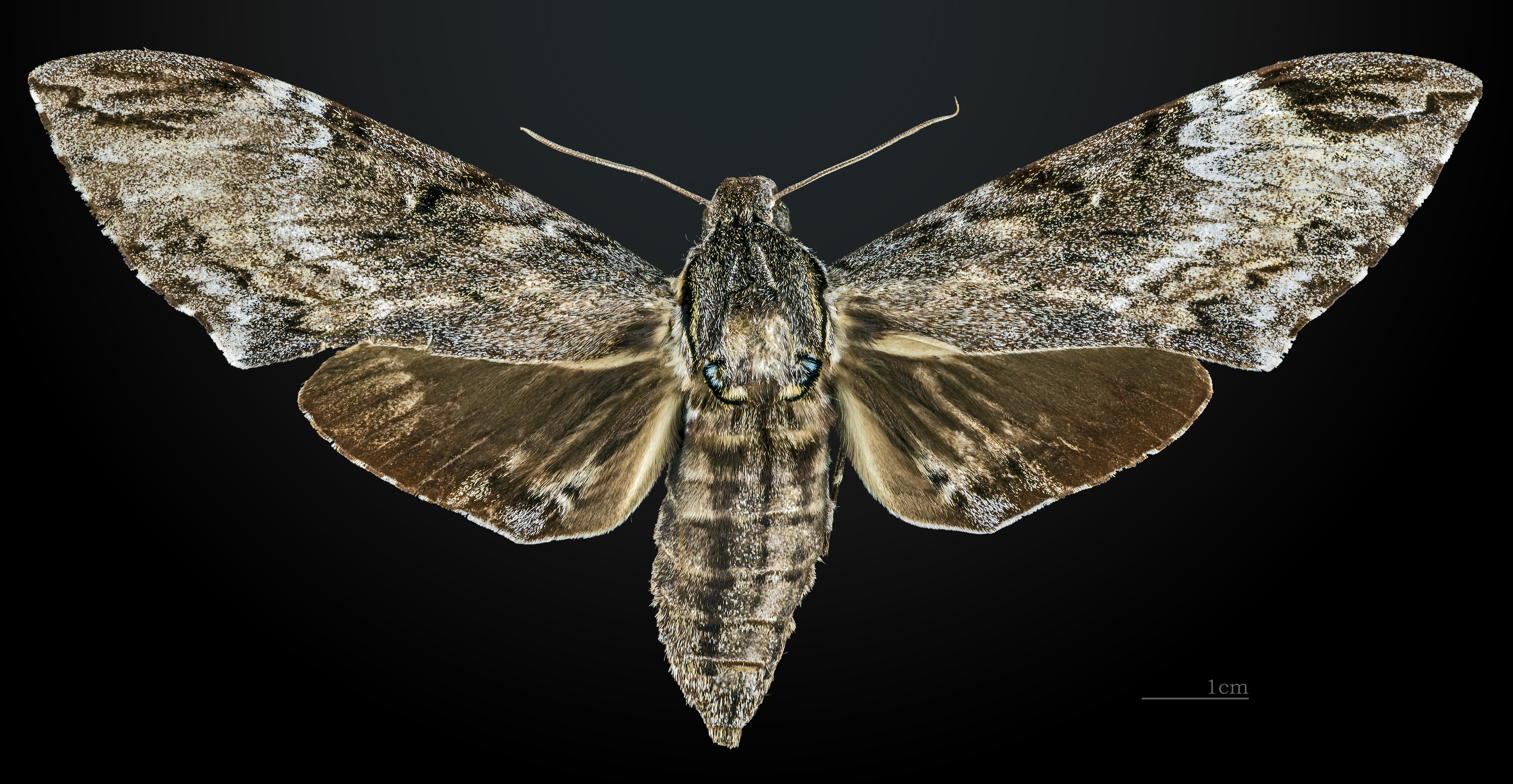
Female, dorsal view

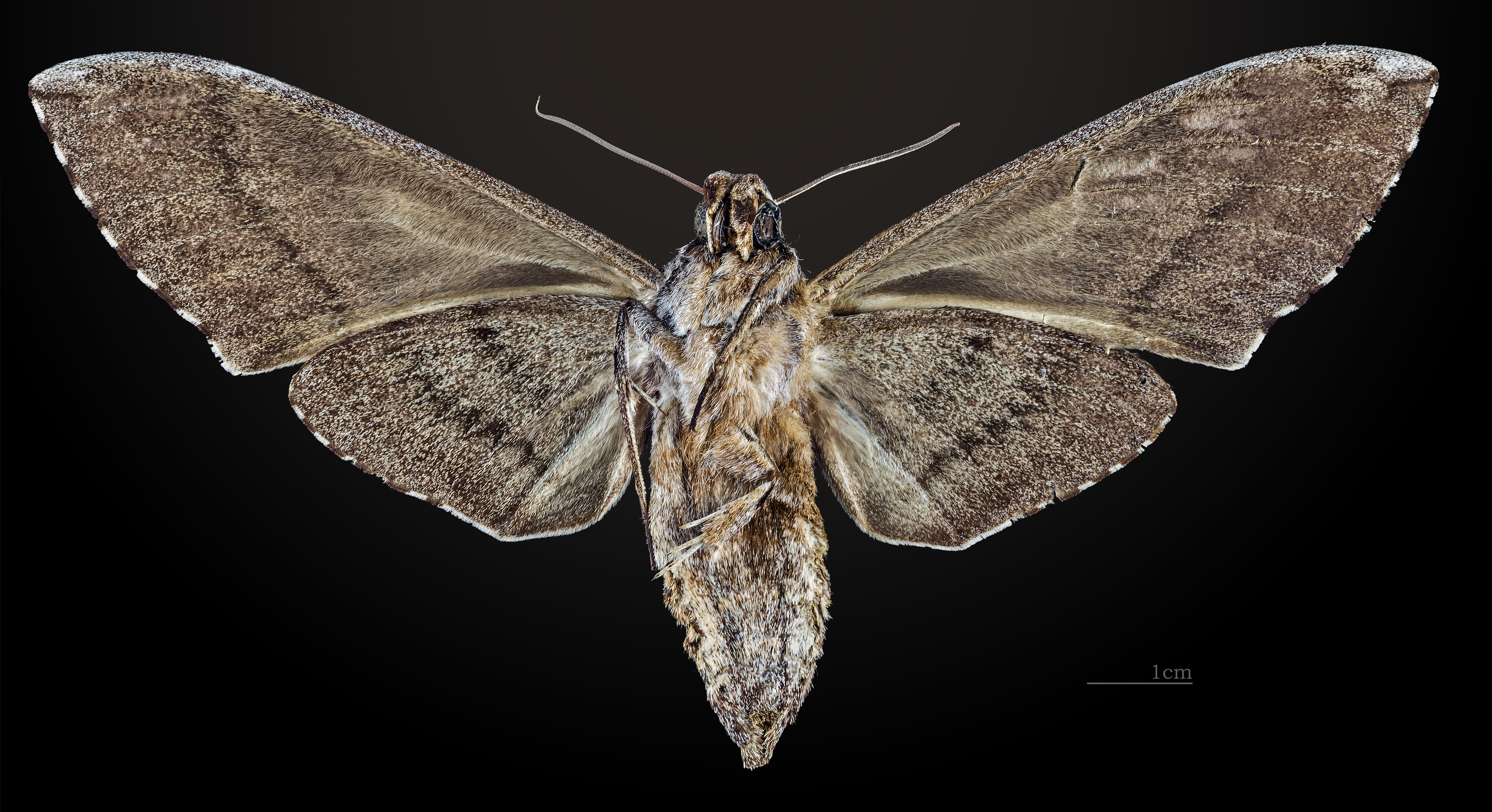
Female, ventral view

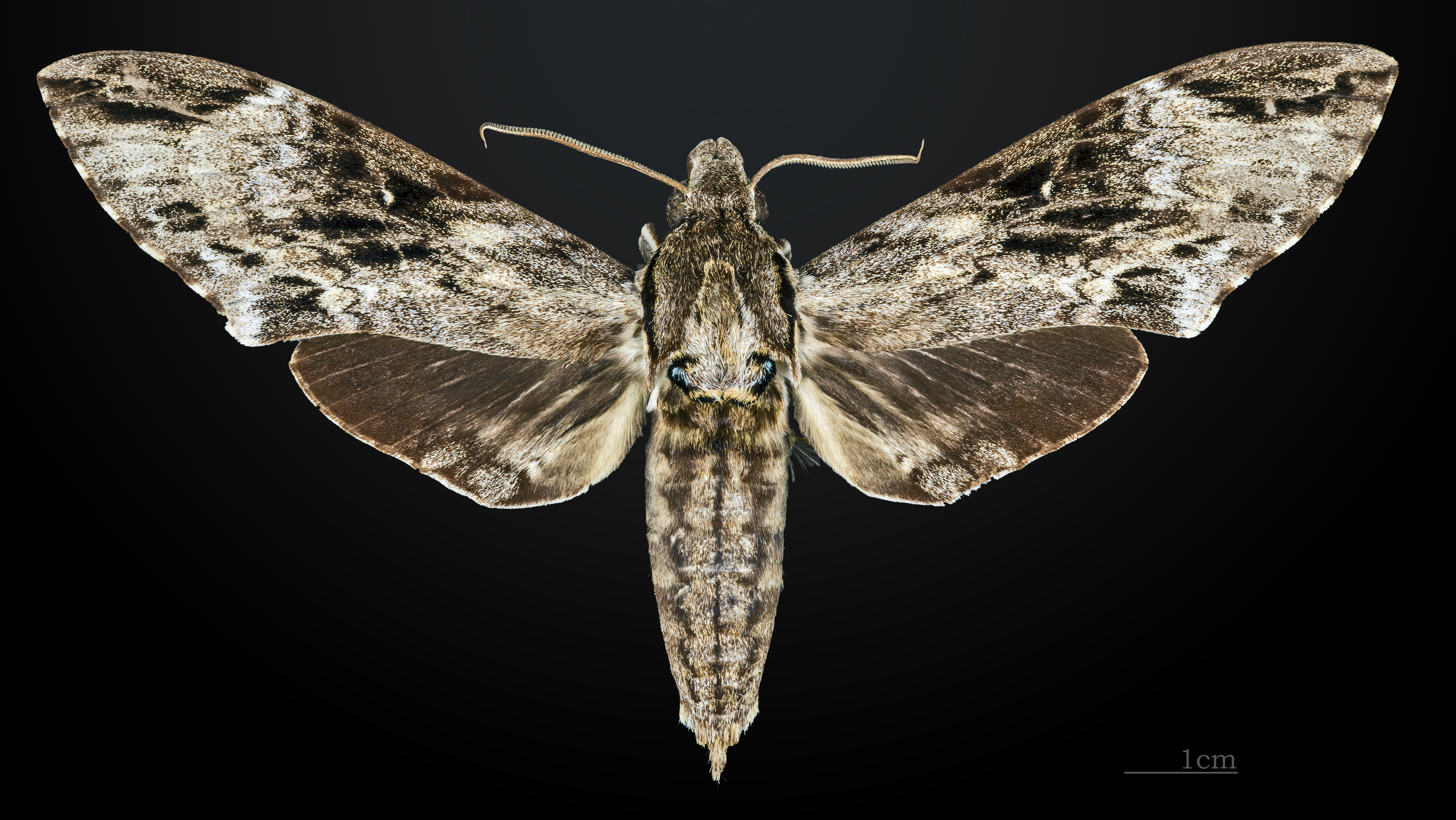
Male, dorsal view

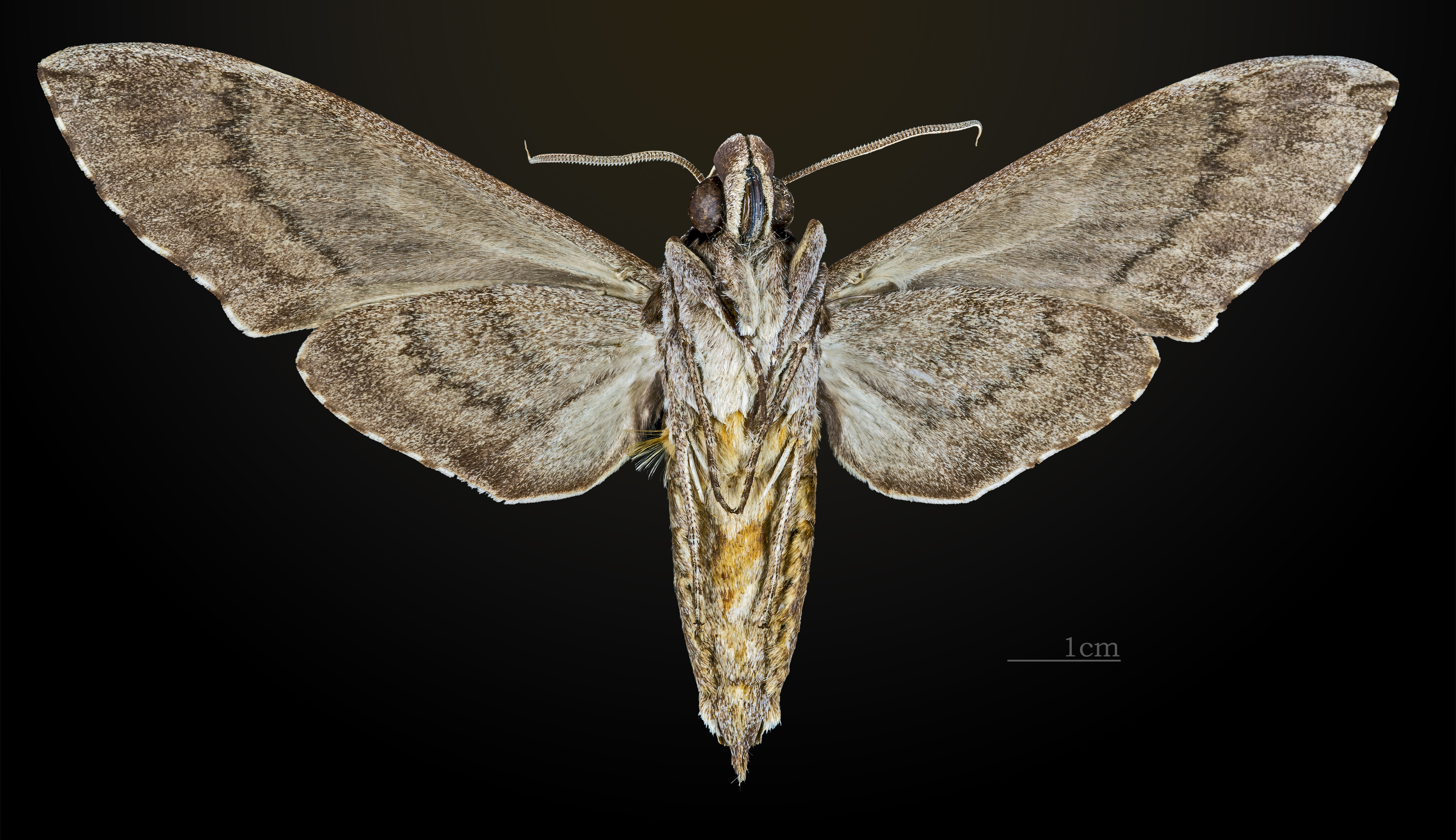
Male, ventral view

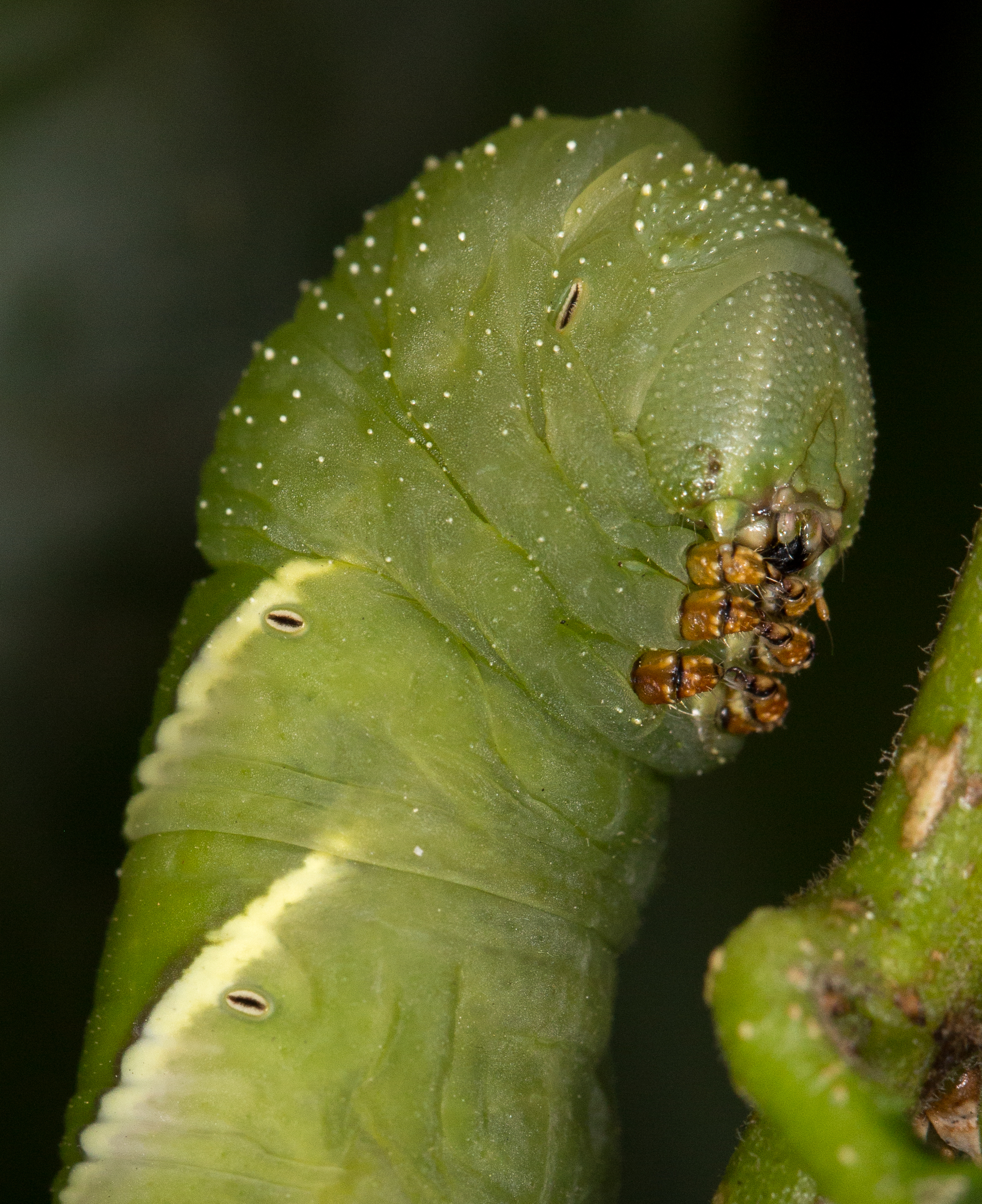
Caterpillar

== Biology ==
Larvae have been recorded on Clerodendrum fortunatum, Ligustrum species (including Ligustrum sinense), Fraxinus, Jasminum, Tectona grandis, Vitex negundo, Callicarpa arborea, Lonicera, Perilla and Osmanthus sesamum.
