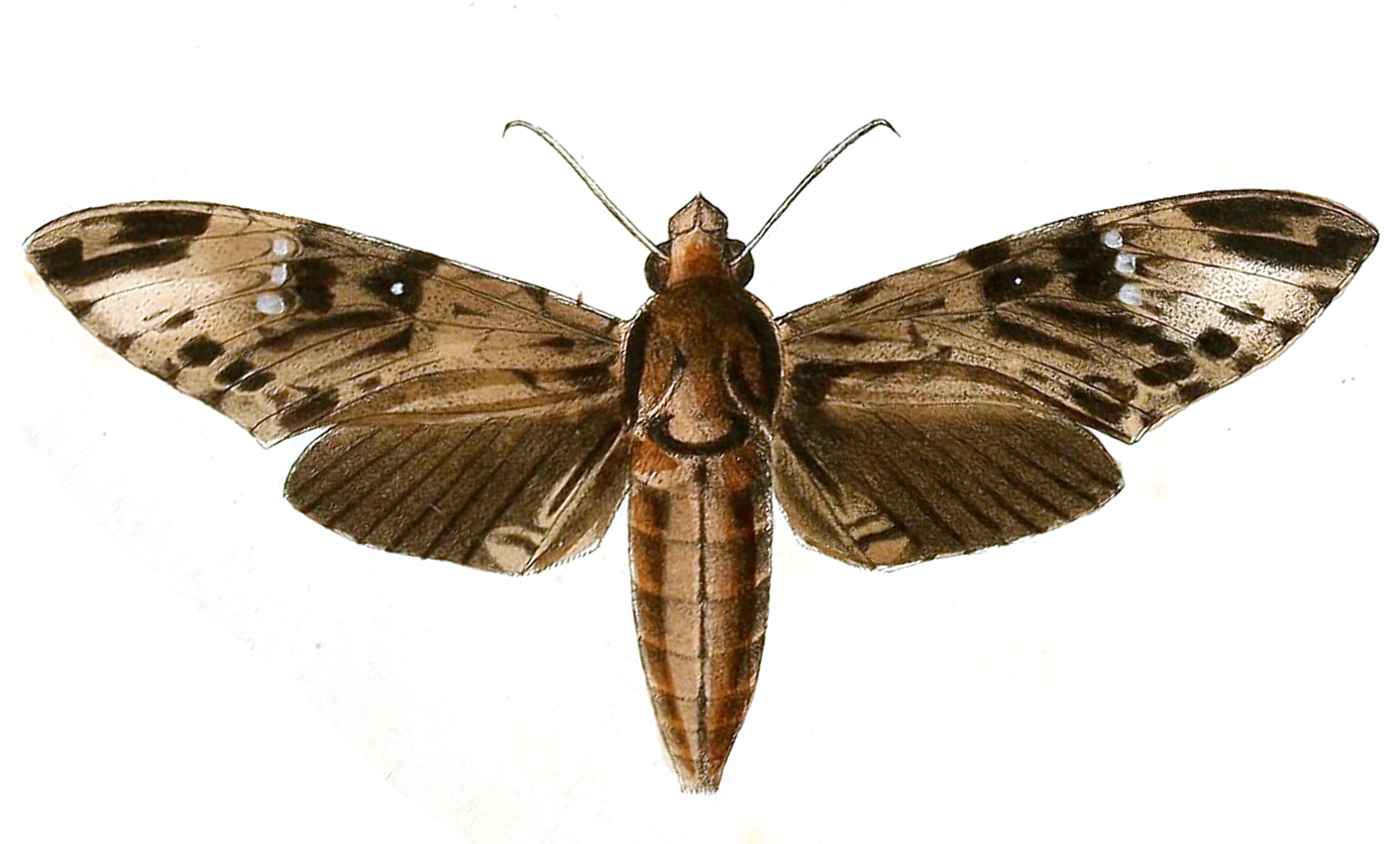

Scientific classification
- Domain: Eukaryota
- Kingdom: Animalia
- Phylum: Arthropoda
- Class: Insecta
- Order: Lepidoptera
- Family: Sphingidae
- Genus: Psilogramma
- Species: P. discistriga

Binomial name
- Psilogramma discistriga (Walker, 1856)

Synonyms
- Macrosila discistriga Walker, 1856; Sphinx emarginata Moore, 1858; Diludia melanomera Butler, A.G., 1875; Macrosila darius Ménétriés, 1857

= Psilogramma discistriga =

Species of moth

Psilogramma discistriga is a moth of the family Sphingidae. It is known from Bangladesh.
