= List of botanical gardens and arboretums in Hawaii =

This list of botanical gardens and arboretums in Hawaii is intended to include all significant botanical gardens and arboretums in the U.S. state of Hawaii.

Name	Image	Affiliation	City	Coordinates
Allerton Garden		National Tropical Botanical Garden	Kauai	21°53′8.67″N 159°29′33.04″W
Enchanted Floral Gardens of Kula, Maui			Kula	20°47′31.92″N 156°19′37.2″W
Foster Botanical Garden		Honolulu Botanical Gardens	Honolulu	21°19′00″N 157°51′33″W
Amy B. H. Greenwell Ethnobotanical Garden		Bishop Museum	Captain Cook	19°29′29″N 155°54′43″W
Hawaii Tropical Botanical Garden			Pāpa'ikou	19°48′38″N 155°5′45″W
Hi'iaka's Healing Herb Garden			Kea'au	19°36′20″N 154°57′13″W
Hoʻomaluhia Botanical Garden		Honolulu Botanical Gardens	Kāne'ohe	21°23′16″N 157°48′29″W
Kahanu Garden		National Tropical Botanical Garden	Maui	20°47′57″N 156°2′18″W
Kaia Ranch Tropical Botanical Gardens			Hāna	20°47′43″N 156°01′56″W
Kalopa State Recreation Area			Hawaii (island)	20°2′19″N 155°26′20″W
Kapiʻolani Community College Cactus Garden		Kapiʻolani Community College	Honolulu	21°16′10.91″N 157°48′4.51″W
Keʻanae Arboretum			Maui	20°51′17.11″N 156°9′1.34″W
Koko Crater Botanical Garden		Honolulu Botanical Gardens	Oahu	21°17′12.84″N 157°40′51.6″W
Kula Botanical Garden			Maui	20°47′31.92″N 156°19′37.2″W
Liliuokalani Botanical Garden		Honolulu Botanical Gardens	Honolulu	21°19′0″N 157°51′0″W
Liliuokalani Park and Gardens			Hilo	19°43′36″N 155°4′6″W
Limahuli Garden and Preserve		National Tropical Botanical Garden	Kauai	22°13′13″N 159°34′33″W
Lyon Arboretum			Honolulu	21°19′58.64″N 157°48′5.82″W
Manuka State Wayside Park			Hawaii (island)	19°6′33″N 155°49′33″W
Maui Nui Botanical Gardens			Kahului	20°53′35.16″N 156°29′9.6″W
McBryde Garden		National Tropical Botanical Garden	Kauai	21°52′57.46″N 159°28′34.79″W
Moir Gardens			Kauai	21°52′38″N 159°27′39″W
Na ʻĀina Kai Botanical Gardens			Kauai	22°12′40.32″N 159°22′53.76″W
Nani Mau Gardens			Hilo	19°40′20″N 155°3′17″W
Olu Pua Botanical Garden and Plantation			Kauai	21°57′35″N 159°31′01″W
Princeville Botanical Gardens			Princeville	22°12′0″N 159°27′15.48″W
Pua Mau Place Arboretum and Botanical Garden			Kawaihae	20°4′15.6″N 155°50′38.76″W
Sadie Seymour Botanical Gardens			Kailua-Kona	19°36′49.5″N 155°58′6″W
Spirit of Aloha Oceanfront Botanical Garden			Maui	20°56′4.26″N 156°15′53.45″W
Tropical Gardens of Maui			Wailuku	20°52′58.73″N 156°31′3.22″W
University of Hawaii at Hilo Botanical Gardens		University of Hawaii at Hilo	Hilo	19°41′59″N 155°04′54″W
Wahiawa Botanical Garden		Honolulu Botanical Gardens	Wahiawa	21°30′08″N 158°01′05″W
Waimea Valley			Haleiwa	21°38′02″N 158°03′06″W
World Botanical Gardens			Hilo	19°54′13.7052″N 155°8′11.9076″W

== See also ==
- List of botanical gardens and arboretums in the United States
- Hawaii-related lists
