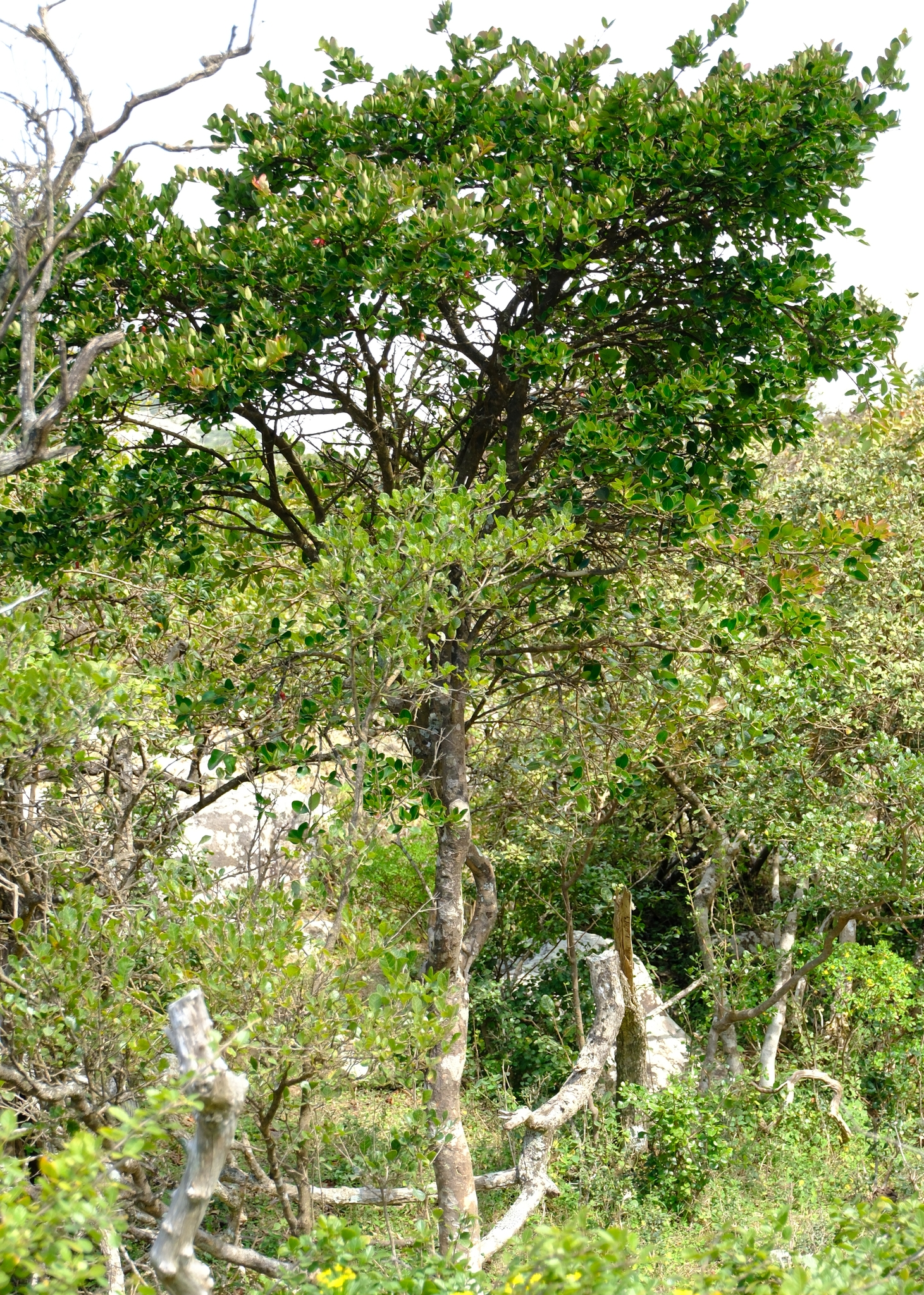

Conservation status
- Vulnerable (IUCN 3.1)

Scientific classification
- Kingdom: Plantae
- Clade: Tracheophytes
- Clade: Angiosperms
- Clade: Eudicots
- Clade: Rosids
- Order: Myrtales
- Family: Lythraceae
- Genus: Punica
- Species: P. protopunica

Binomial name
- Punica protopunica Balf.f.

Synonyms
- Socotria protopunica (Balf.f.) G.M.Levin

= Punica protopunica =

Species of plant

Punica protopunica, commonly known as the pomegranate tree or Socotran pomegranate, is a species of flowering plant in the family Lythraceae. It is endemic to the island of Socotra (Yemen). Its natural habitat is subtropical or tropical dry forests.

The tree, often thorny, attains a height of 2.5 to 4.5 m (8 ft 2 in to 14 ft 9 in). It has reddish-brown bark when young, fading to grey as it ages and becomes less fruitful. Leaves are dark green, glossy, and opposite, growing up to 3 cm (1.2 in) long. The fruit are globose and 2–3 cm in diameter. Flowers and fruits occur from December and January through to the summer.

P. protopunica is considered to be the precursor to the pomegranate (P. granatum) and is the only other species in the genus Punica. It differs from the pomegranate in having pink (not red), trumpet-shaped flowers and smaller, less sweet fruit. The fruit when ripe are yellowish-green or brownish-red in color.

== As food for humans ==
The fruit are not an important food on Socotra. The pithy tissue lying under the skin and around the seeds of larger, ripe fruits is the only part eaten. The seeds are said to be bitter and caustic, and to cause sores on the tongue. The skin of the unripe fruit is extremely sour.

== As food for livestock ==
In the well-vegetated areas of the island, the foliage is little grazed, except in a prolonged dry season, when the fallen dead leaves are eaten. In drier areas, goats eat the leaves and especially the new shoots of smaller and more prostrate shrubs, while sheep eat dry plant litter. It is not palatable to cattle. Goats are fond of the immature fruit and small livestock also like the flowers, fresh or dried.

== Medicinal use ==
The skins of the fruit are crushed and cooked, and the paste is applied to treat sores and wounds. Alternatively, they are dried and crushed to a powder, which is applied topically to treat skin sores in the same way. Occasionally, people eat the seeds as a purge to relieve stomachache. More recently, people have started using the skins to treat stomach complaints and expel worms, a treatment apparently learned from the mainland.

== Other uses ==
The skin of a pink-colored, unripe fruit, rather than a fully ripe red one, is crushed in water and added to a small amount of fresh milk to sour it. The soured milk is then used to curdle fresh milk before churning it to make butter.

== Wood ==
The wood is hard and close-grained and used to make small implements. The straight branches of larger specimens are used to make herding staffs. It makes good timber and is termite resistant, but it is usually too small in diameter to be useful for anything other than roofing infill. Branches are used to make protective or concealing covers for waterholes and rock cisterns, and the wood is considered to be as durable and strong as the wood of Buxanthus pedicellatus for this purpose. Dead wood makes good firewood, making little smoke and giving out good heat. Dead wood also makes good charcoal.

== Distribution ==
In addition to its natural distribution in Socotra, it has also been planted in Hawaii at the Koko Crater Botanical Garden.
