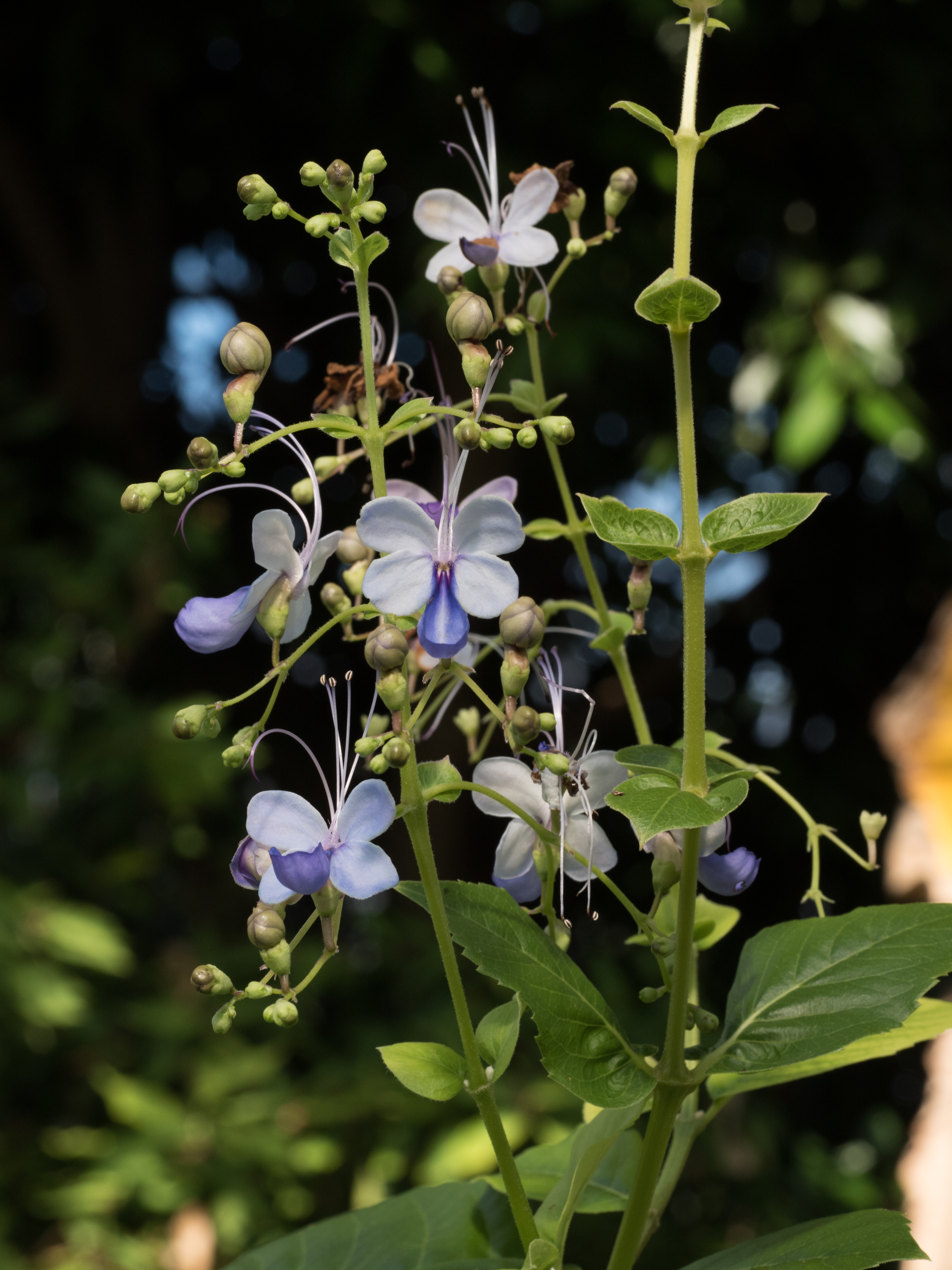

Conservation status
- Least Concern (IUCN 3.1)

Scientific classification
- Kingdom: Plantae
- Clade: Tracheophytes
- Clade: Angiosperms
- Clade: Eudicots
- Clade: Asterids
- Order: Lamiales
- Family: Lamiaceae
- Genus: Rotheca
- Species: R. myricoides

Binomial name
- Rotheca myricoides (Hochst.) Steane & Mabb.

Synonyms
- Clerodendrum myricoides (Hochst.) R.Br. ex Vatke; Cyclonema myricoides Hochst.; Cyrtostemma myricoides (Hochst.) Kunze; Siphonanthus myricoides (Hochst.) Hiern; Spironema myricoides Hochst.

= Rotheca myricoides =

Species of flowering plant

Rotheca myricoides, also known as the Butterfly Clerodendrum or Butterfly Bush, is a species of flowering plant in the family Lamiaceae. It is native to tropical eastern Africa and widely cultivated elsewhere. In cultivation, it is frequently known by one of its synonyms, such as Clerodendrum myricoides.

The cultivar 'Ugandense' is an untidy evergreen shrub growing to 4 m (13 ft) tall and 2.5 m (8.2 ft) broad, with oval leaves and masses of pale-violet blue butterfly-like flowers in summer and autumn. Each flower has a darker blue lower petal. With a minimum temperature of 10 °C (50 °F), this plant can only be grown under glass in temperate zones. The altitude range for this species is 900–1680 m. The plant has won the Royal Horticultural Society's Award of Garden Merit.

== Distribution ==
Rotheca myricoides is native to mountains from Eritrea to South Africa. It is native to Angola, Botswana, Burundi, Caprivi Strip, Democratic Republic of the Congo, Djibouti, Eswatini, Eritrea, Ethiopia, Kenya, KwaZulu-Natal, Malawi, Mozambique, Namibia, Northern Provinces, Rwanda, Somalia, Sudan, Tanzania, Uganda, Zambia, and Zimbabwe. It was introduced to Trinidad-Tobago, Australia, and Brazil.

== Habitat ==
This species may be found in rocky places, streams and edges of the evergreen forest. The shrub thrives in frost free climates, tolerating full sun to part shade, but preferring part shade and moist, well-drained soils rich in organic matter. In colder climates, 'Ugandese' is often grown in containers as it cannot stand temperatires below 10 °C (50 °F). If temeperatures fall below -3.9 °C (25 °F) the plant may die, but rejuvenates from its roots in spring.

== Etymology ==
The genus name, Rotheca, seemingly comes from the Malaysian words "cheriga", which means small, and "thekku", which means teak. The species epithet comes from the French word "myriades", which means ten thousand, and a Latinization of the Greek "oides", which means to see. Some say that the species epithet came about because it resembles another species in Myrica, so the name refers to the leaf shape.

'Ugandense' is a cultivar of this species which shows purplish-blue flowers with flashy stamens. It was originally named Clerodendrum myricoides 'Ugandense', but a 1998 study led to its current status as Rotheca myricoides 'Ugandense".

== Morphology ==
=== Flowers ===
The flowers are arranged in dichasial cymes and are sometimes arranged in short-pedunculate panicles. The stamens and styles are long-exserted and curve upwards. The corolla is asymmetrical in the bud and they have a mid-lobe dark blue or violet blue, while the lateral lobes are pale blue or mauve. The calyx is bud-shaped with a 5mm long tube, and the lobes are rounded to triangular.

There is lots of variation in the flower colour. It can be green and blue or mauve, white and blue, or blue to mauve.

=== Fruits ===
The fruits of this species are 5-6 by 8–10 mm in dimension and are mostly deeply four-lobed. To attract birds the plant produces small, black, drupe-like fruits when pollinated.

=== Leaves ===
The leaf outline is mostly ovate to rhomboid. The outline can sometimes be elliptic or obovate. The leaf margin is dentate or deeply lobed. The indumentum of the leaves can vary. There is often a hairy upper surface, and the lower surface can be sparsely to densely hairy. It has been described as feeling velvety. When the leaves are crushed, there is an unpleasant scent. This may be due to the pelate hairs or pelate glands on the leaves. The leaves are opposite whorls of 3–4. The petiole is 0–24 mm long.

=== Branches ===
The young branches are normally angular, pale greyish-whitish and with white lenticels. They are hairy, mostly at the growth points. The arrangement of the main branches are normally opposite. There are prominent leaf scars on the branches as well. The branches can be four-angled and brownish-red towards the apex. The lateral branches are short, leafy and flowering.

== Medicinal uses ==
=== Traditional ===
Rotheca myricoides is used in traditional medicine to manage diabetes in the lower eastern part of Kenya. This area is populated mostly by the Kamba community. They take this medicine daily by boiling and consuming the leaves. This species is also used to treat epilepsy, arthritis, typhoid, cough, eye problems, tonsillitis, rheumatism, gonorrhoea, cancer, malaria, dysmenorrhea, sterility, and impotence.

In traditional medicine, European and African cultures used the bark of the species in its powdered form, and a teaspoon is used to treat snakebites. The Masai used the root bark for East Coast fever in cattle and diarrhea in their calves. The Haya and Shambala used Rotheca myricoides for dysmenorrhoea and cough, furunculosis and swellings that are associated with debility. In various African communities, the root of the plant is also used for chest pain, colds, gum bleeding indigestion, headaches, and bathing people with convulsions. In West Africa, the plant is used for analgesic and antipyretic purposes.

In Asian countries, this species has been brewed as a tea to relieve swelling and pain.

=== Recent studies ===
A 2019 study looked at freeze-dried extracts of the Rotheca myricoides and found that they possess significant anti-hyperglycemic and antidyslipidemic effects on a type 2 diabetes rat model. The antidyslipidemic effects included decreased total plasma cholesterol, LDL-cholesterol, serum triglyceride and increased HDL-cholesterol. The freeze-dried extracts also lowered the serum uric levels and hepatic triglycerides and hepatic weight. This study confirms the effectiveness of the traditional medicine to manage diabetes in Kenya. The mechanism for the antidiabetic effects is due to the modulation of PPAR-γ.

A 2008 study found that Rotheca myricoides had antimutagenic properties. The leaf extract of the species and DCM and MeOH extracts shows clear anti-mutagenicity. The antimutagenic properties were seen even at low doses of 0.05 mg/L.

Rotheca myricoides is one ingredient (along with four African medicinal plants: Clerodendrum glabrum E. Mey., Lamiaceae, Gladiolus dalenii van Geel, and Senna occidentalis (L.) Link) in a new COVID-19 therapeutic candidate called PHELA. In vitro testing found that PHELA inhibited >90% of SARS-CoV-2 and SARS-CoV infection at concentration levels of 0.005 mg/mL to 0.03 mg/mL. They also found that PHELA had very strong binding energy interactions with SARS-CoV-2 proteins.

== Ecology ==
The Rotheca myricoides interacts with several other species. Pseumenes depressus, the Asian hornet, and Xylocopa ruficeps all visit the Rotheca myricoides. Xylocopa phalothorax, Xylocopa tranquebarorum, and Xylocopa nasalis eat the Rotheca myricoides. The plant plays a significant role in its native ecosystems by supporting pollinators like butterflie and bees. Its long corolla tubes are adapted to attract specific pollinators with long proboscises for effective pollen transfer. The plant provides food to birds that consume its drupes, helping in seed dispersal.

The status on the Red List of South African plants is at "Least Concern" as assessed on 2005/06/30, as it was not highlighted as a potential taxa for conservation concern.
