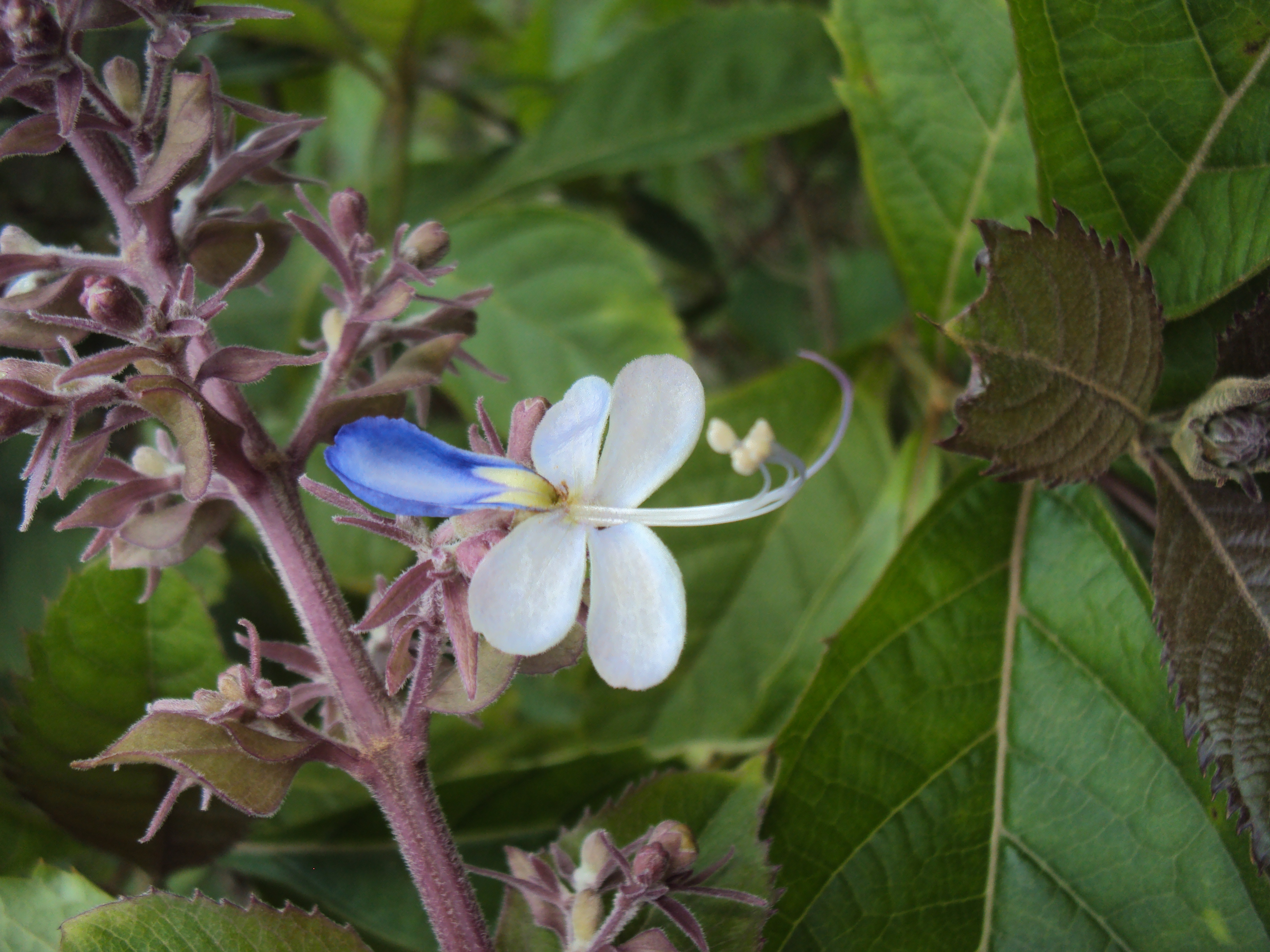
- Rotheca serrata

Scientific classification
- Kingdom: Plantae
- Clade: Tracheophytes
- Clade: Angiosperms
- Clade: Eudicots
- Clade: Asterids
- Order: Lamiales
- Family: Lamiaceae
- Genus: Rotheca
- Species: R. serrata

Binomial name
- Rotheca serrata (L.) Steane & Mabb.

Synonyms
- Clerodendrum cuneatum Turcz.; Clerodendrum divaricatum Jack; Clerodendrum grandifolium Salisb.; Clerodendrum herbaceum Roxb. ex Schauer; Clerodendrum javanicum Walp. [Illegitimate]; Clerodendrum macrophyllum Sims; Clerodendrum ornatum Wall. [Invalid]; Clerodendrum serratum (L.) Moon; Clerodendrum serratum var. amplexifolium Moldenke; Clerodendrum serratum var. glabrescens Moldenke; Clerodendrum serratum var. herbaceum (Roxb. ex Schauer) C.Y.Wu; Clerodendrum serratum f. lacteum Moldenke; Clerodendrum serratum var. nepalense Moldenke; Clerodendrum serratum var. obovatum Moldenke; Clerodendrum serratum var. pilosum Moldenke; Clerodendrum serratum var. velutinum Moldenke; Clerodendrum serratum var. wallichii C.B.Clarke; Clerodendrum ternifolium D.Don [Illegitimate]; Clerodendrum trifoliatum Steud.; Cyclonema serratum (L.) Hochst.; Rotheca bicolor Raf.; Rotheca ternifolia Raf.; Volkameria herbacea Roxb. [Invalid]; Volkameria serrata L.

= Rotheca serrata =

Blue fountain bush

Species of flowering plant

Rotheca serrata, commonly known as the blue fountain bush, the blue-flowered glory tree or the beetle killer, is a species of flowering plants in the family Lamiaceae. It is native to India, Sri Lanka and Malaysia.

== Description ==
Rotheca serrata is a small bush growing to a height of up to 8 feet (2.4 m). The squarish stems are only sparsely branched. The young growth is glabrous and the leaves are in opposite pairs or develop with three at a node. They are oval, serrated and hairless with an acute base and a stout petiole. The flowers are showy and develop in cymes which are covered with short, soft erect hairs. The individual flowers are small and form part of an erect pyramidal panicle up to 10 in (25 cm) long. The corolla of each flower is blue, cylindrical, hairless outside and hairy inside and the stamens arch out from it. The four upper lobes are flat and spreading while the lowest lobe forms a concave lip. The fruit is a four-lobed fleshy drupe, green at first and black when ripe.

== Distribution ==
Rotheca serrata is native to eastern India, Sri Lanka and Malaysia and is found in forests.

== Uses ==
The plant is also used in Ayurveda for snake bites.

== Common names ==
- Hindi - Bharangi (भरंगी)
- Manipuri - Moirang khanam (মোইরাংগ খানম)
- Marathi - Bharangi (भरंगी)
- Tamil - Sirutekku (சிறு தேக்கு)
- Malayalam - Cherutekku
- Telugu - Gantubarangi
- Kannada - Gantabarangi
- Gujarati - Bharangi (भरंगी)
