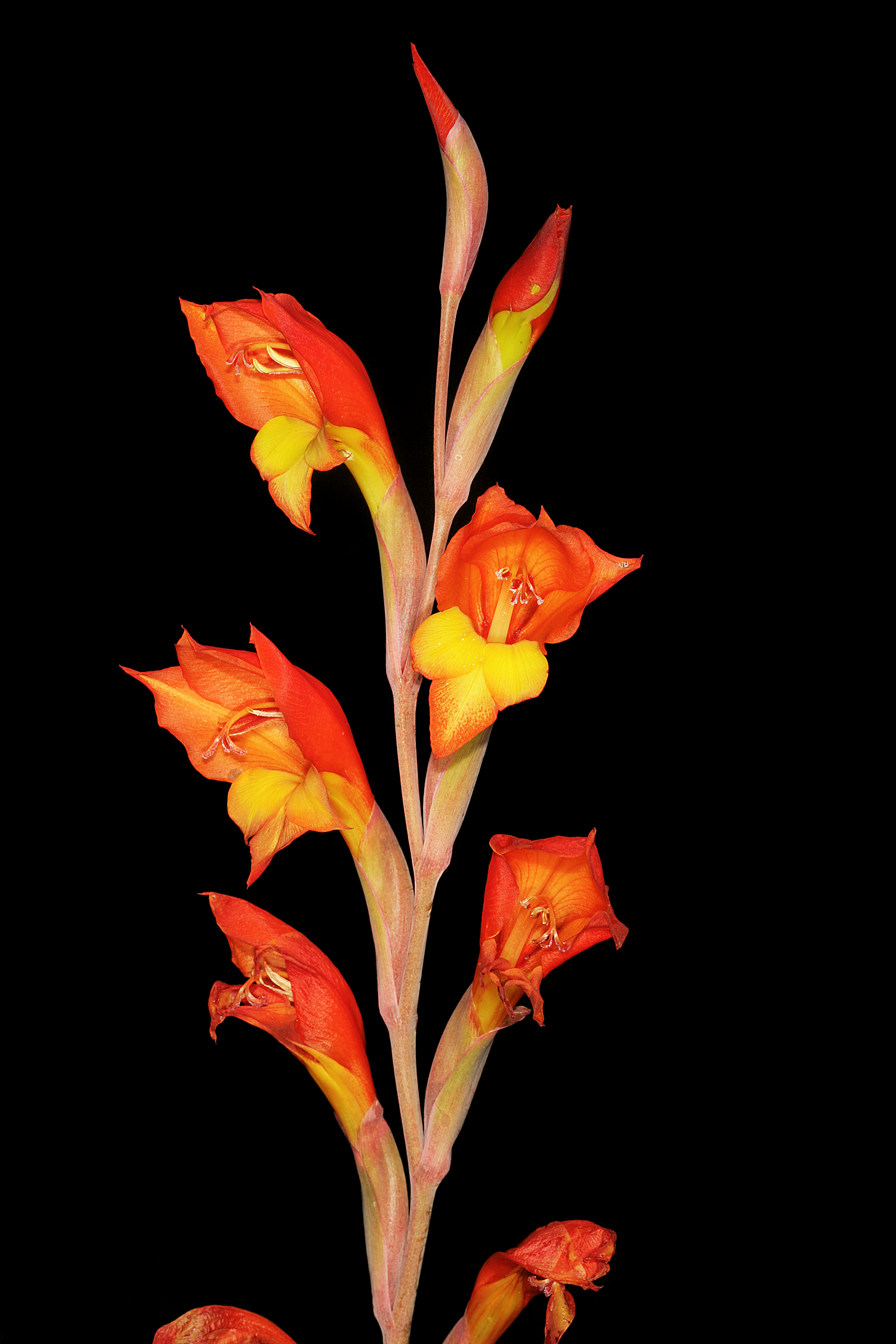
- In South Africa

Scientific classification
- Kingdom: Plantae
- Clade: Tracheophytes
- Clade: Angiosperms
- Clade: Monocots
- Order: Asparagales
- Family: Iridaceae
- Genus: Gladiolus
- Species: G. dalenii

Binomial name
- Gladiolus dalenii Van Geel

= Gladiolus dalenii =

Species of flowering plant

Gladiolus dalenii is a species of flowering plant in the iris family Iridaceae. It is one of the most widely distributed species of Gladiolus, ranging from eastern South Africa and Madagascar throughout tropical Africa and into western Arabia. It is the main parental species of the large flowering grandiflora hybrids. This species is also unusual in its genus in including diploid, tetraploid and hexaploid races. The hybrids produced from it are often tetraploids.

It produces five tall flower spikes of yellow to scarlet flowers, often streaked red over a yellow ground color, generally with a yellow throat. In cultivation, it prefers a light sandy neutral to slightly acid soil with a pH between 6.5 and 7 in a sunny sheltered position and requires a stony gritty loam.

== Gallery ==
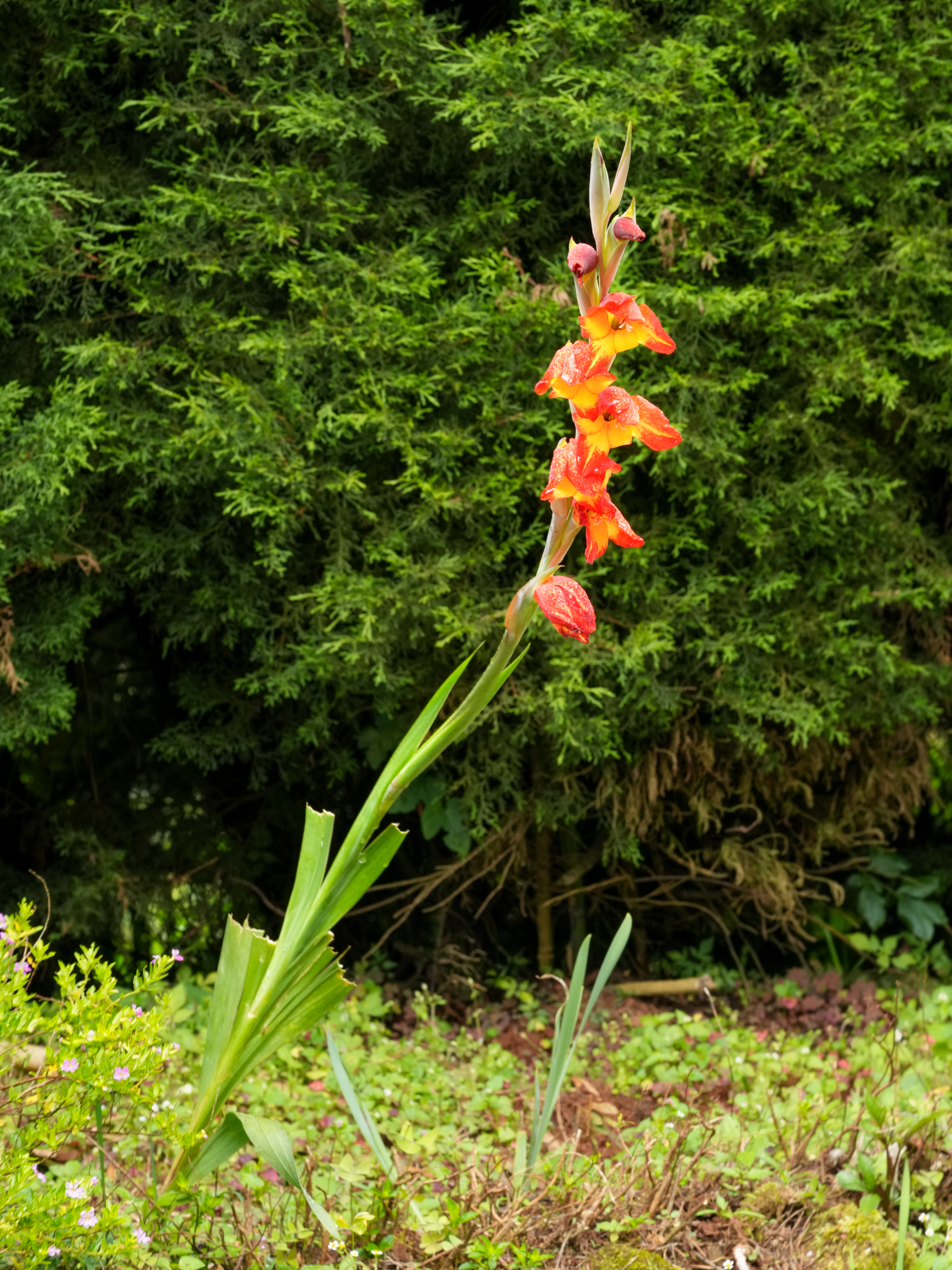
Plant with flowers, Ooty, India

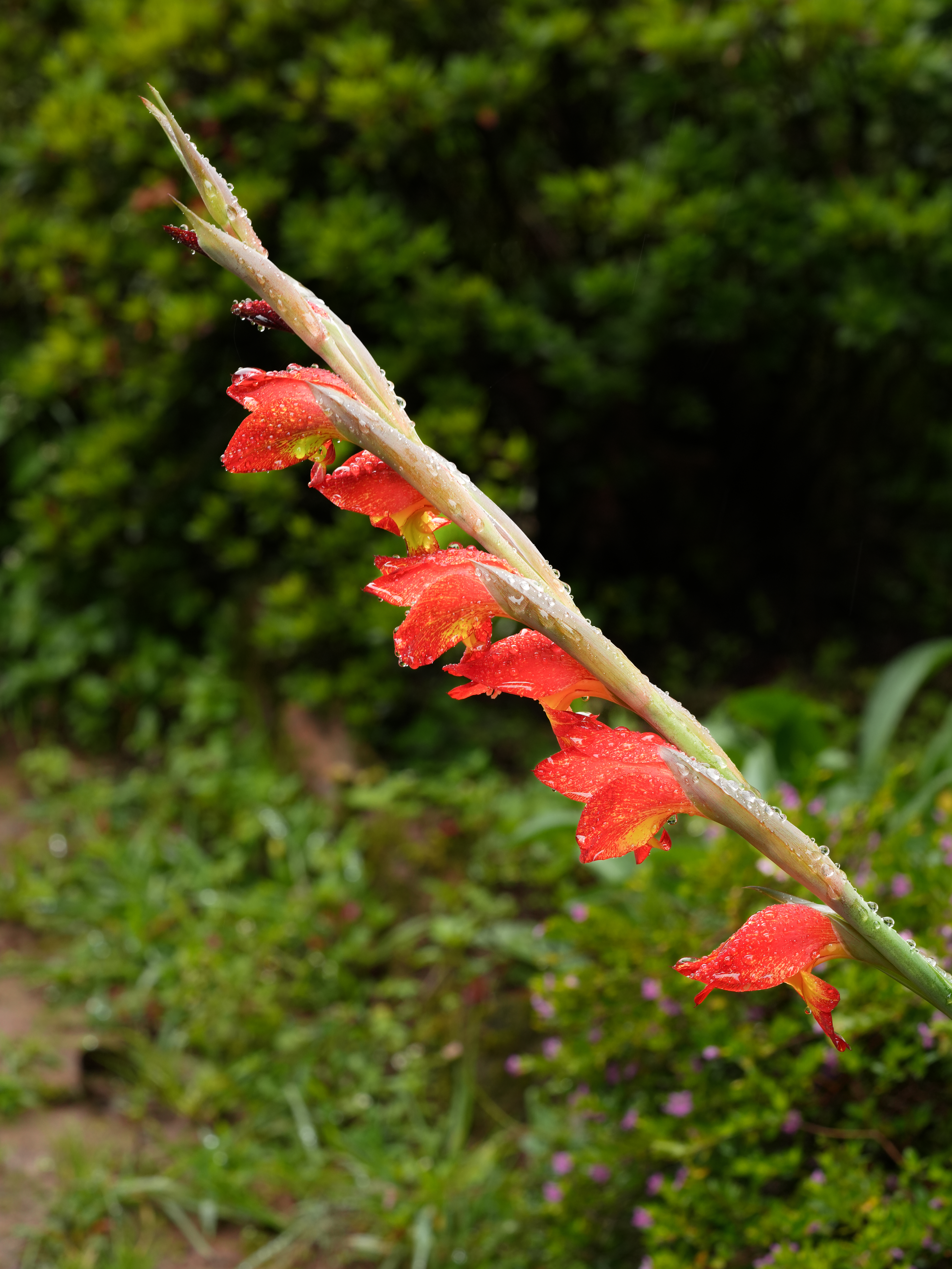
Flowers and buds, Ooty, India

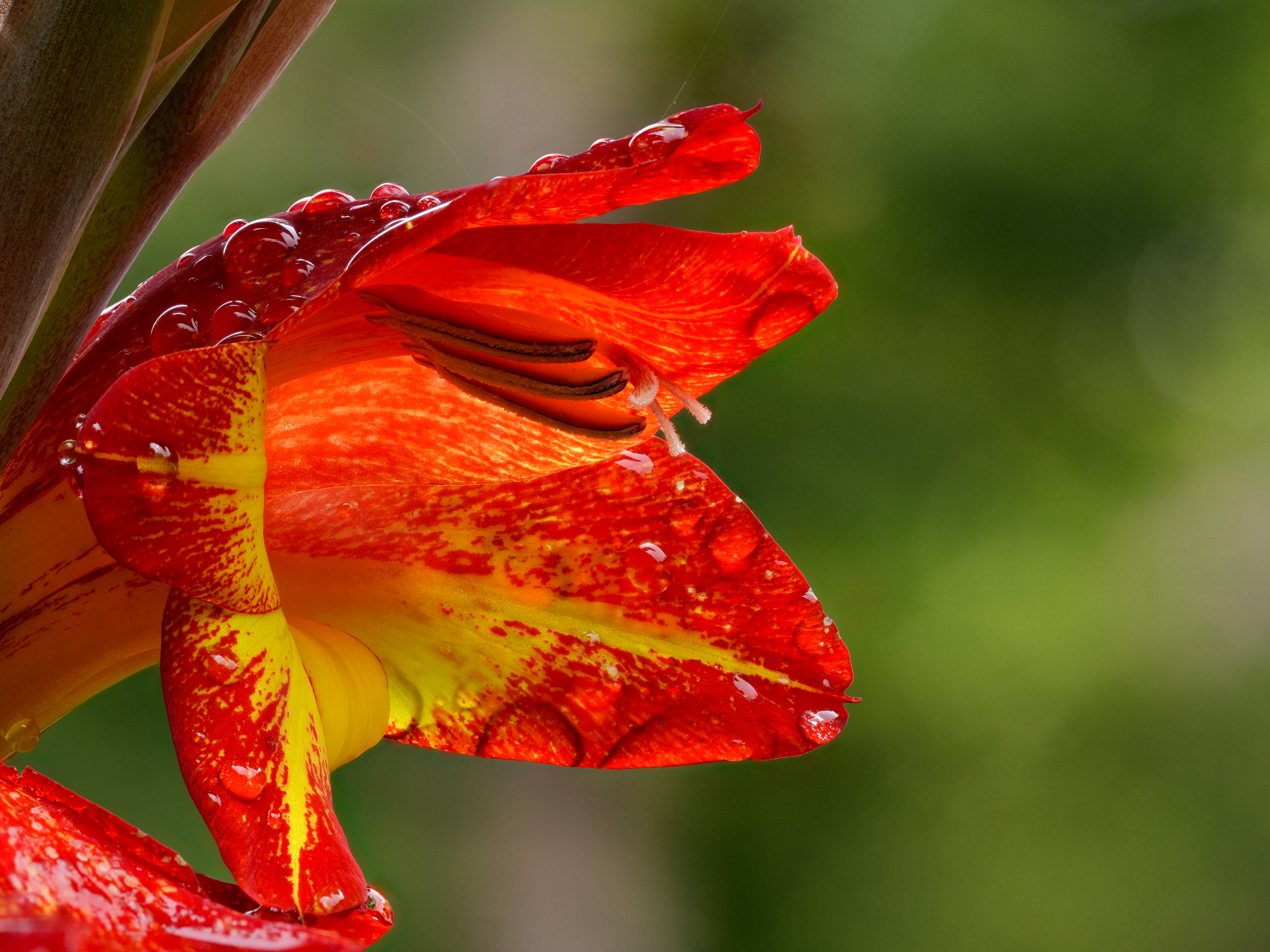
Single flower, Ooty, India

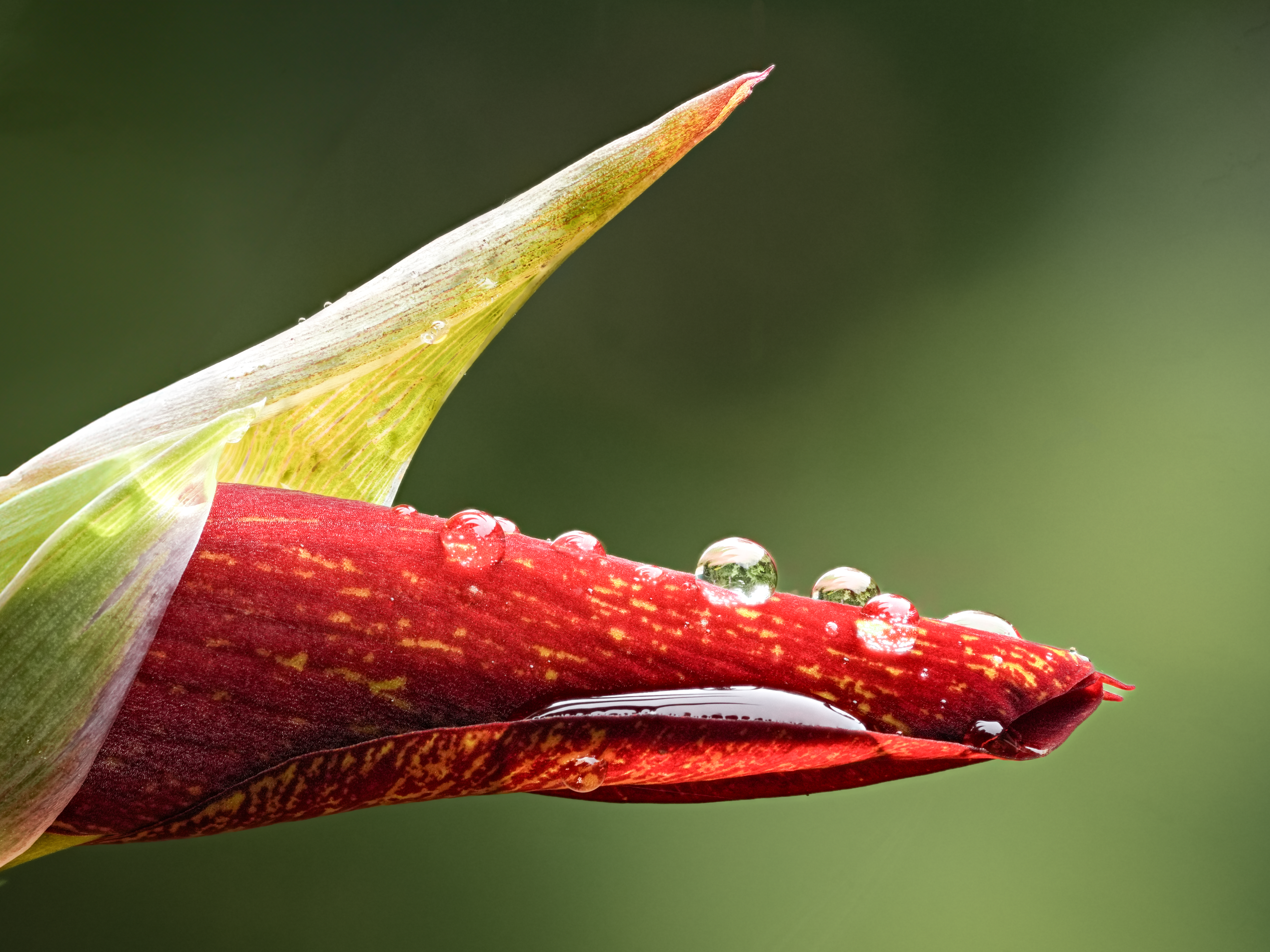
Bud in rain, Ooty, India

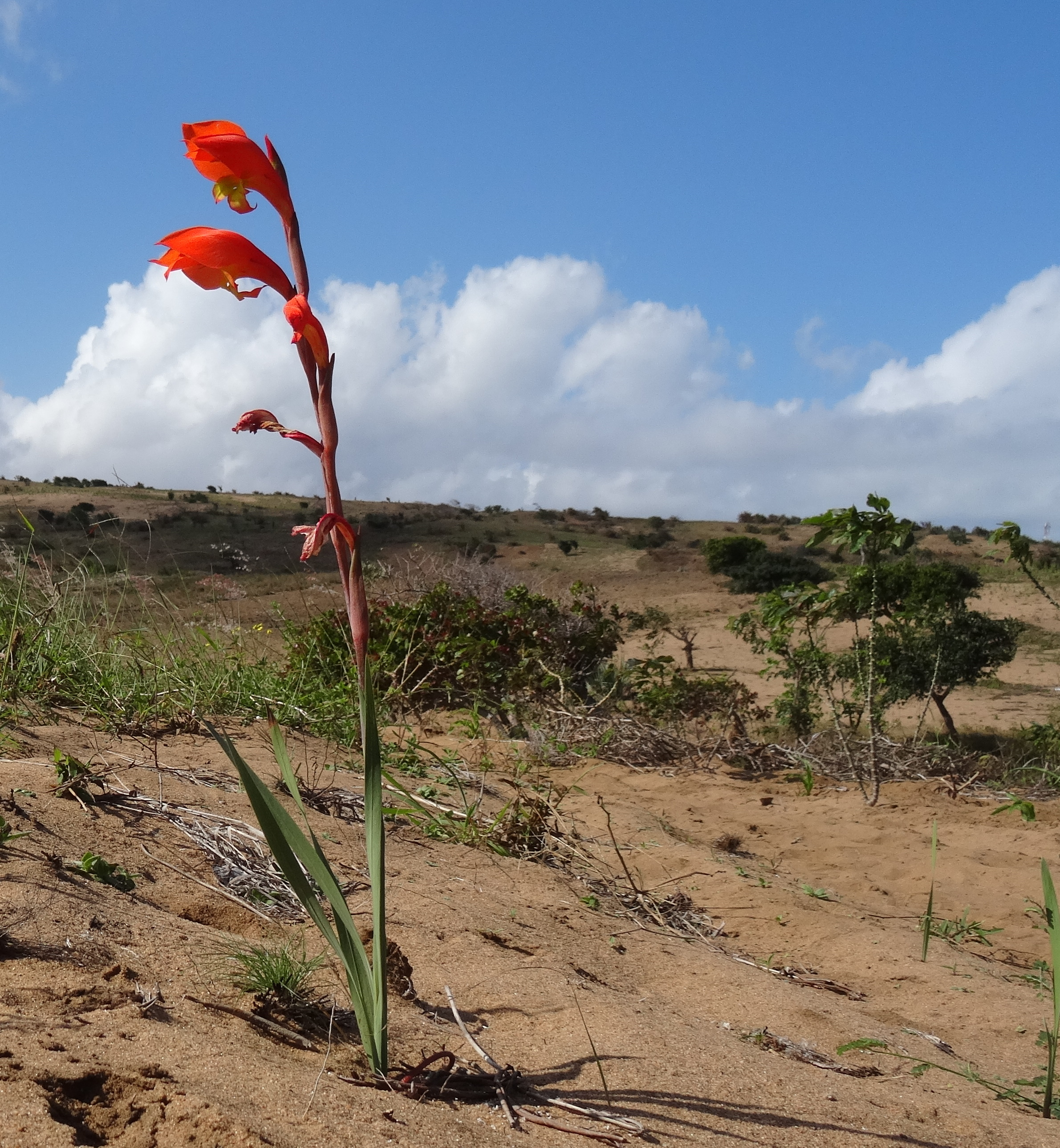
Wild plant in dunes of Mozambique

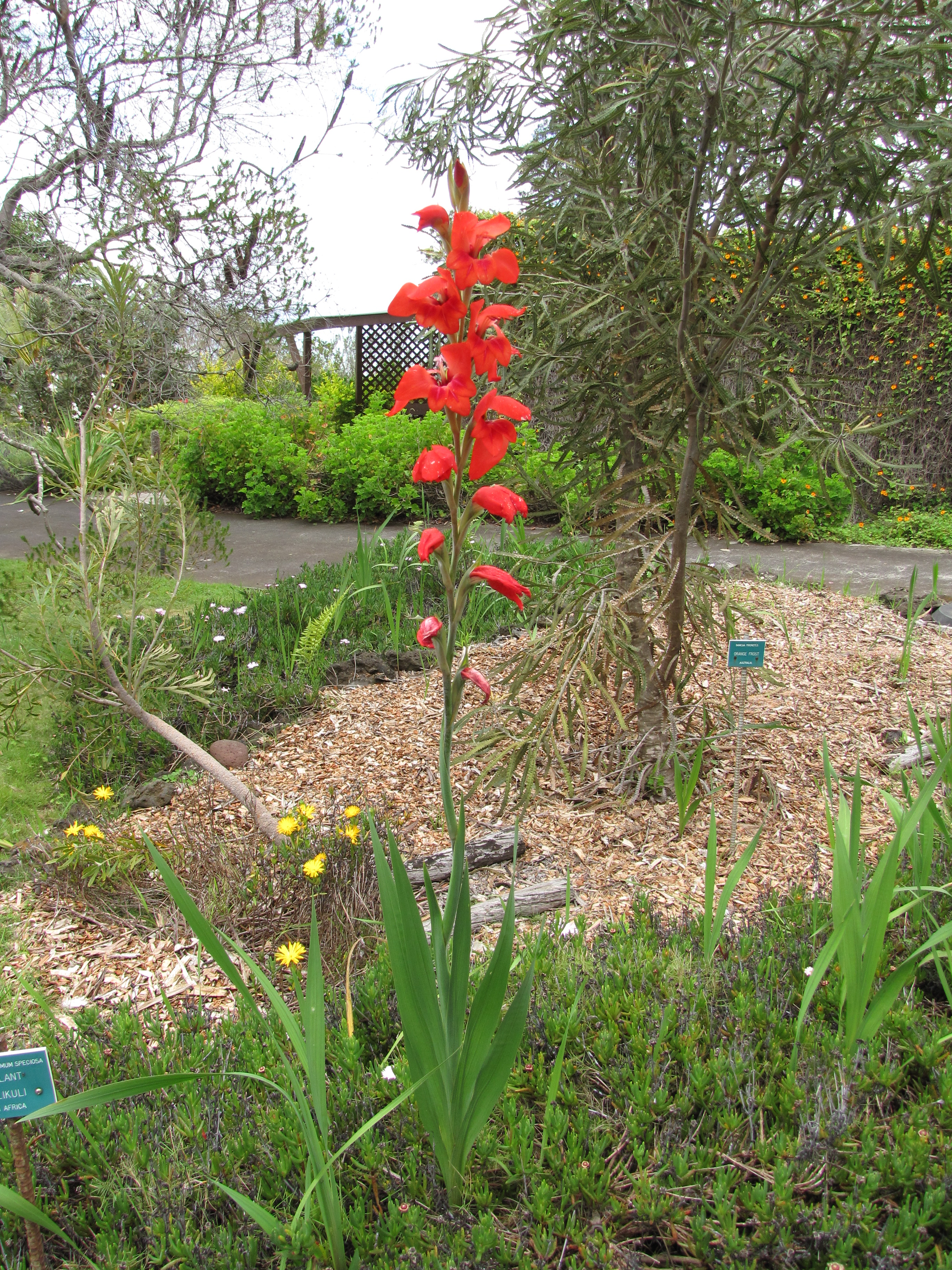
Kula Botanical Garden, Hawaii
