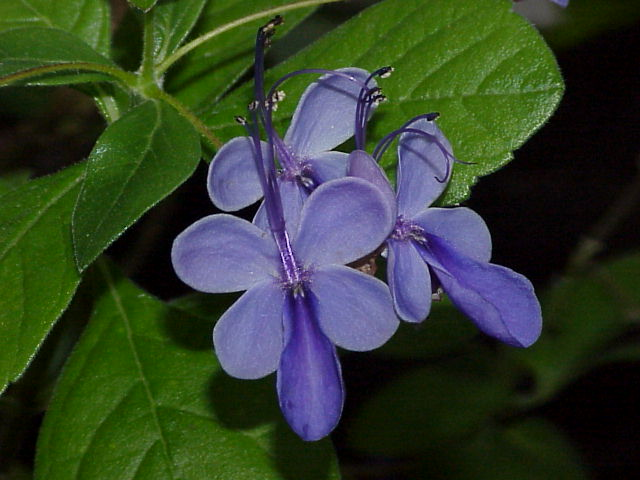
- Rotheca myricoides

Scientific classification
- Kingdom: Plantae
- Clade: Tracheophytes
- Clade: Angiosperms
- Clade: Eudicots
- Clade: Asterids
- Order: Lamiales
- Family: Lamiaceae
- Subfamily: Ajugoideae
- Genus: Rotheca; Rafinesque

Type species
- Rotheca serrata Rafinesque

Species
- See text

Synonyms
- Cyclonema Hochst.

= Rotheca =

Genus of flowering plants

Rotheca is a genus of flowering plants in the family Lamiaceae. Estimates of the number of species in the genus vary from about 35 to as many as 60. Three of the species are native to tropical Asia, with the rest occurring in Sub-Saharan Africa. The type species for the genus is Rotheca serrata. It had originally been named Rotheca ternifolia, but this name is now considered illegitimate.

Rotheca myricoides is native to tropical East Africa and is cultivated as an ornamental throughout the tropics. Rotheca serrata is from tropical Asia and has some medicinal use there.

In the 20th century, Rotheca was rarely recognized as separate from Clerodendrum. Rotheca was revived in 1998 as a result of phylogenetic analysis of DNA sequences. It can easily be distinguished from Clerodendrum by a combination of morphological characters.

== Description ==
The following description is adapted from the most recent monograph on Lamiaceae.

Rotheca is a genus of shrubs, subshrubs, and herbaceous perennial plants, with a few becoming lianas or small trees. They emit an unpleasant odor when damaged. The leaves are opposite or whorled, and sessile or with a short petiole. The calyx is actinomorphic or nearly so, and not accrescent as in some related genera. The corolla is blue, purple, or white, (rarely yellow), and 5-lobed. The abaxial lobe is often larger and different in color. The four stamens are long-exserted. The ovary is unlobed at anthesis, becoming lobed during maturity. The fruit is 4-lobed and resembles a drupe, but eventually separates into four 1-seeded mericarps.

== Taxonomy ==
Rotheca was named by Rafinesque in 1838. The name is a Latinization of a Malayalam name meaning "small teak". The Indian (Malayalam) name has had widely variant spellings.

In 1895, John Isaac Briquet included Rotheca in his rather broad circumscription of Clerodendrum. Briquet's treatment was generally followed for the next 100 years, but doubts about it were often expressed. The genus Rotheca was revived in 1998, based on molecular phylogenetic work, some of which was not published until 1999. In this work, it was shown that inclusion of Rotheca in Clerodendrum renders the latter polyphyletic.

== Species ==
One commonly consulted species list provides only a few examples. The transfer of species from Clerodendrum to Rotheca continues in a piecemeal fashion, and is mostly for the compilation of local floras. As of July 2015, The Plant List accepts the following species:

- Rotheca alata (Gürke) Verdc.
- Rotheca amplifolia (S.Moore) R.Fern.
- Rotheca aurantiaca (Baker) R.Fern.
- Rotheca bukobensis (Gürke) Verdc.
- Rotheca caerulea (N.E.Br.) P.P.J.Herman & Retief
- Rotheca calundensis (R.Fern.) R.Fern.
- Rotheca commiphoroides (Verdc.) Steane & Mabb.
- Rotheca cuneiformis (Moldenke) P.P.J.Herman & Retief
- Rotheca cyanea (R.Fern.) R.Fern.
- Rotheca farinosa (Roxb.) Govaerts
- Rotheca hirsuta (Hochst.) R.Fern.
- Rotheca incisa (Klotzsch) Steane & Mabb.
- Rotheca kissakensis (Gürke) Verdc.
- Rotheca louwalbertsii (P.P.J.Herman) P.P.J.Herman & Retief
- Rotheca luembensis (De Wild.) R.Fern.
- Rotheca makanjana (H.J.P.Winkl.) Steane & Mabb.
- Rotheca mendesii (R.Fern.) R.Fern.
- Rotheca myricoides (Hochst.) Steane & Mabb. (syn. Clerodendrum ugandense Prain) – Butterfly Bush
- Rotheca pilosa (H.Pearson) P.P.J.Herman & Retief
- Rotheca prittwitzii (B.Thomas) Verdc.
- Rotheca quadrangulata (B.Thomas) R.Fern.
- Rotheca reflexa (H.Pearson) R.Fern.
- Rotheca rupicola (Verdc.) Verdc.
- Rotheca sansibarensis (Gürke) Steane & Mabb.
- Rotheca serrata (L.) Steane & Mabb.
- Rotheca suffruticosa (Gürke) Verdc.
- Rotheca taborensis (Verdc.) Verdc.
- Rotheca tanneri (Verdc.) Verdc.
- Rotheca teaguei (Hutch.) R.Fern.
- Rotheca vanprukii (Craib) Leerat. & Chantar.
- Rotheca verdcourtii (R.Fern.) R.Fern.
- Rotheca violacea (Gürke) Verdc.
- Rotheca wildii (Moldenke) R.Fern.
