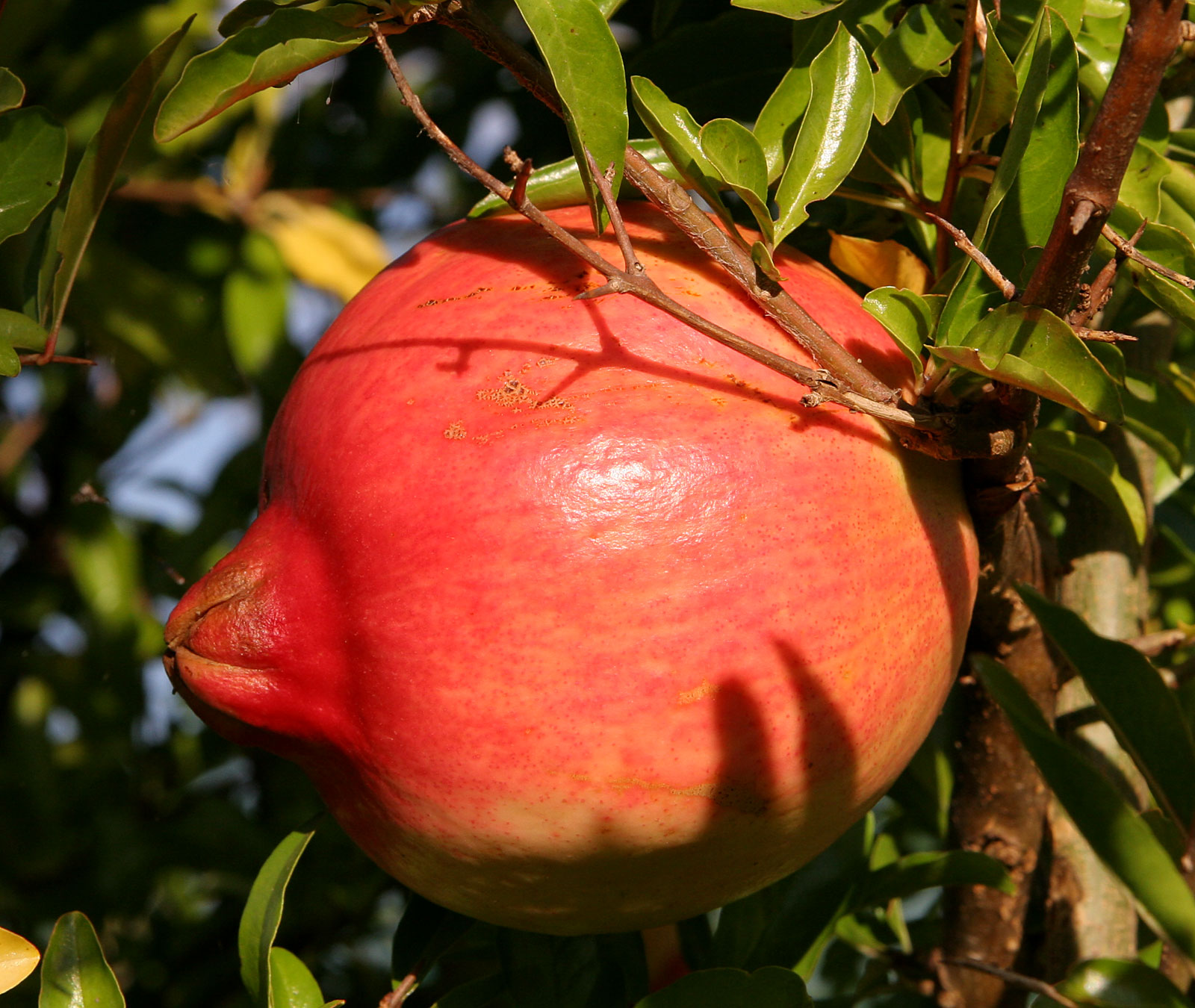
- Punica granatum

Scientific classification
- Kingdom: Plantae
- Clade: Tracheophytes
- Clade: Angiosperms
- Clade: Eudicots
- Clade: Rosids
- Order: Myrtales
- Family: Lythraceae
- Subfamily: Punicoideae (Horan.) Graham, Thorne & Reveal
- Genus: Punica; L.

Species
- See text

Synonyms
- Socotria G.M.Levin

= Punica =

Punica Temporal range: Eocene–Recent

Genus of flowering plants

Punica is a small genus of fruit-bearing deciduous shrubs or small trees in the flowering plant family Lythraceae. The better known species is the pomegranate (Punica granatum). The other species, the Socotra pomegranate (Punica protopunica), is endemic to the island of Socotra. It differs in having pink (not red) flowers and smaller, less sweet fruit.

Although Punica was previously placed in its own family Punicaceae, recent phylogenetic studies have shown that it belongs in the family Lythraceae, and it is classified in that family by the Angiosperm Phylogeny Group.

The name is derived from the Latin word for the pomegranate, malum punicum, meaning "Carthaginian apple".

The oldest fossils of the genus are from the Eocene of Europe, with the genus being widespread in Europe during the Miocene epoch.

== Extant species ==
Image	Scientific name	Common name	Distribution
	Punica granatum L.	Pomegranate	Iran to northern India
	Punica protopunica Balf.	Socotran pomegranate	island of Socotra (Yemen)

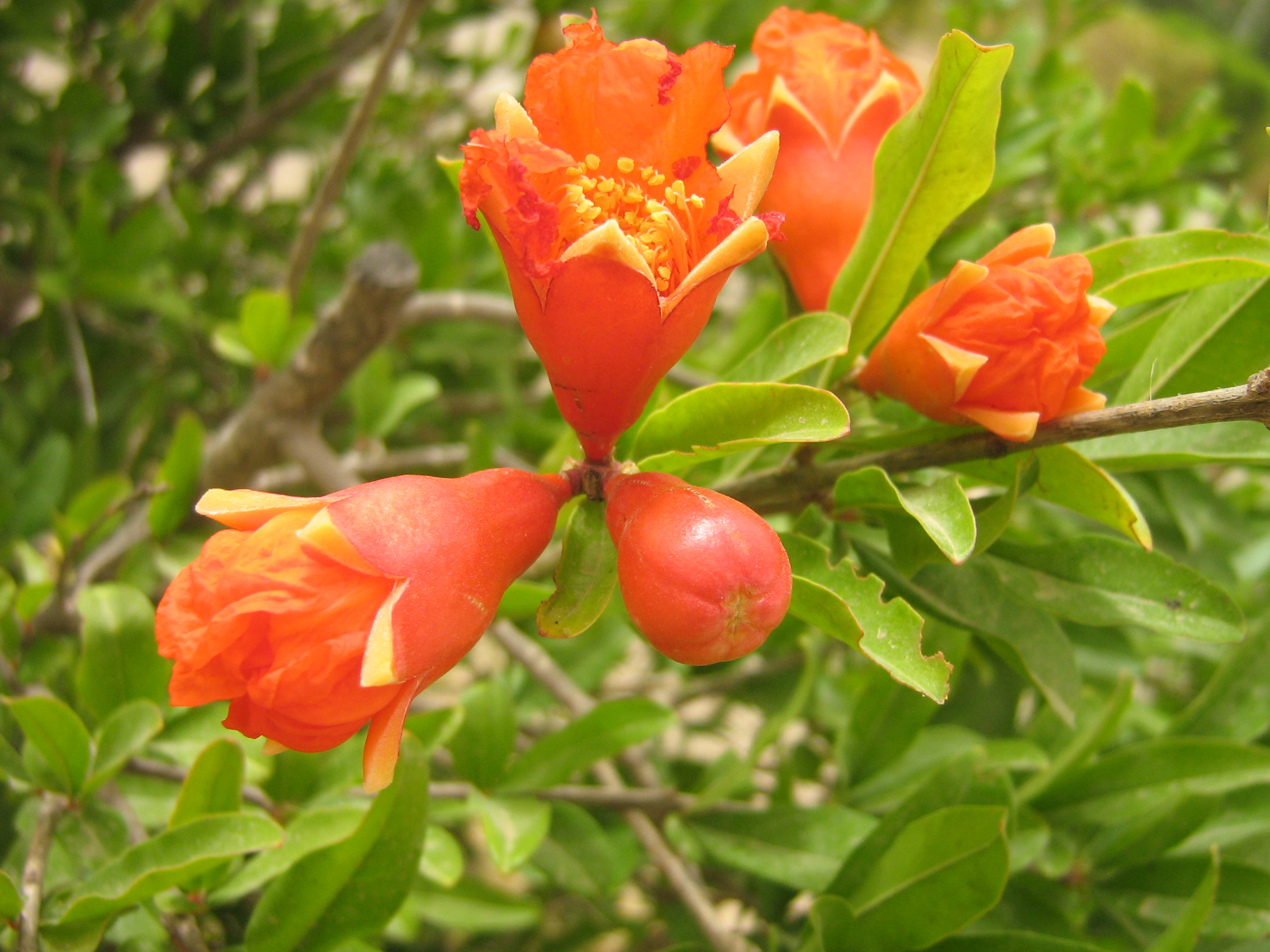
Flowers of P. granatum
