= Folklore in Hawaii =

Overview of Hawaiian mythology and legends

Folklore in Hawaii in modern times is a mixture of various aspects of Hawaiian mythology and various urban legends that have been passed on regarding various places in the Hawaiian islands. The following is a partial list of some of these legends.

== Ancient Hawaiian folklore ==
=== Night marchers ===
According to Hawaiian legend, night marchers (Hawaiian: huaka‘i pō) are ghosts of ancient warriors. They supposedly roam large sections of the island chain, and can be identified by their groups of torches. They can usually be found in areas that were once large battlefields, such as the Nuʻuanu Pali on the island of Oahu. Legend has it that, if you look a night marcher straight in the eye, you will be forced to walk among them for eternity but, if you have a relative taken by them, you will be spared. Hawaiians say that, in the presence of night marchers, one should lie down on their stomach, face down to avoid eye contact, stay quiet, breathe shallowly, and not move. Some say that they may nudge you to provoke a reaction so they can take you. Moanalua Gardens is one of the many places the Night Marchers are said to roam.

=== Carrying pork over the Nuʻuanu Pali ===
Local folklore on the island of Oahu says that one should never carry pork over the Pali Highway connecting Honolulu and Windward Oahu. The stories vary, but the classic legend is that, if one carries pork of any kind over the old Pali road (not the modern Pali highway) by automobile, the automobile would stop at a certain point on the way and not restart until the pork is removed from the vehicle.

- Some versions of the story require the pork to be raw; other versions say that this happens after dark.
- In some versions, a white dog or an old woman in a holoku will appear at the time the automobile stalls, and you must feed the pork to the dog to proceed.

This legend has its roots in ancient Hawaiian mythology. According to legend, the Hawaiian volcano goddess Pele and the demigod Kamapua‘a (a half-man-half-pig) had a turbulent relationship, and the two agreed not to visit each other. If one takes pork over the Pali, the legend goes, one is symbolically taking a piece of Kamapua‘a from one side to the other, and Pele will stop that from happening.

Alternately, the legend is attributed to a magic dog, which was killed and cooked and put in an 'umeke to be carried over the pali and given as a gift to the mother or wife of the perpetrator. Women did not eat pork in ancient Hawaii, but were allowed to eat dog. The dog's owner followed and called to the dog, which came alive, answered from within the 'umeke, causing the carrier to drop his pole and flee. The dog then returned to its master. A dog as food was offensive to the American missionaries, and under their influence, the dog meat in the story became pork. The Pele/Kamapua'a story was adapted to make the story fit: the old lady in the white holoku is also Pele, but this appears to be a corruption from other tales.

=== Ke-alii-ai Kanaka (The chief who eats men) ===
The legend of Ke-alii-ai Kanaka comes from the middle-to-late 18th century and tells of a man named Kokoa, who went on to become a cannibal chief who plagued two islands. In his youth, he was a renowned fighter with a brutal appetite for human flesh. His story begins and ends on Oahu. In it unknown how he came to love the taste of humans to an obsessive degree, but he was shunned from his home shortly after it was discovered by his community. He led a small group of followers up into the Waianae mountains, where they promptly vanished. Some times later, Kokoa and his band posed as a group of settlers who came to land on Kauai's shores, seeming from an unknown place. The King of Kauai at the time received them and noticed multiple differences between them and what he thought Hawaiian people to be, such as their darker-than-usual skin complexion, odd ways of speaking and complete lack of a set of uniform laws between them. Most glaringly, their starkly contrasting religious practices. Kokoa, renaming himself Ka-Lo, integrated smoothly into the Kauai community at first. In their public ceremonies, they would feast and play as their neighbors would. In their secret ceremonies, they would cook and eat victims and sometimes children, disguising the meat as pork. The higher-ranking members of their group, namely Ka-Lo and his daughter, were festooned with plentiful tattoos and shell jewelry. The chief himself was covered head-to-toe in tattoos depicting the natural world. He had his daughter wed a local chief, though this does not end well for either his people or the Kauai village nearest to his area. His daughter, ignorant of them, broke a Kapu law and was slain. Enraged by this turn of events, Ka-Lo and his followers revealed their cannibalistic nature in a night of devilry. They captured people they could find and held a feast of them. Shortly after this event, they fled back to Oahu, choosing to secret themselves away into the gulch of Waianae to a plateau called "Halemanu." (House of the Hand). This isolated location could only be reached on foot by a single pathway, and they would hunt anyone who walked it. This continued for some time, until the brother of a man named Hoahanau was kidnapped and dragged into the forest. Hoahanau was himself a strapping man yet, when he saw Ai-Kanaka's monstrous disposition, he fled the area. He spent the next several months honing his body and reflexes with endless training and matches against any and all fighters his words could reach. When the time came for his rematch, he coated himself in oil and approached the pathway, calling out his foe's real name. Ai-kanaka, then Ka-Lo, first Kokoa, lurked out of his home and boastfully accepted the challenge unarmed. As their match ensued, he found he could not grasp the younger man's body for any grabs, nor could he match him blow-for-blow. Thrown to the ground again and again, he sprung up to flee into his home to fetch a weapon, only to be caught, knocked off balance and thrown over the edge of his plateau home into the barbed bramble of trees below.

== Modern urban legends ==
=== Green Lady ===
The story of the green lady is that of a woman who would visit the gulch of Wahiawa, which also contains the Wahiawa Botanical Garden, with her children. One day while visiting, one of her children became lost and was never found. The story goes that she still wanders the gulch looking for her child, or children, and will take any child that she comes across in the gulch. There have been several reports of seeing a green woman covered in moss or mold wandering the gulch. Others say that the green woman closely resembles that of a Japanese mythological creature called the kappa. This creature is said to resemble a turtle-like humanoid that steals children to feast upon. The last known sighting was said to have happened in the mid to late 1980s. In modern times, children and teenagers dare each other to run across the bridge that runs over the gulch at night. Most speculators say that this story was made up to keep children from wandering into the gulch by themselves.

== See also ==
- Glen Grant
- Hawaiian mythology
