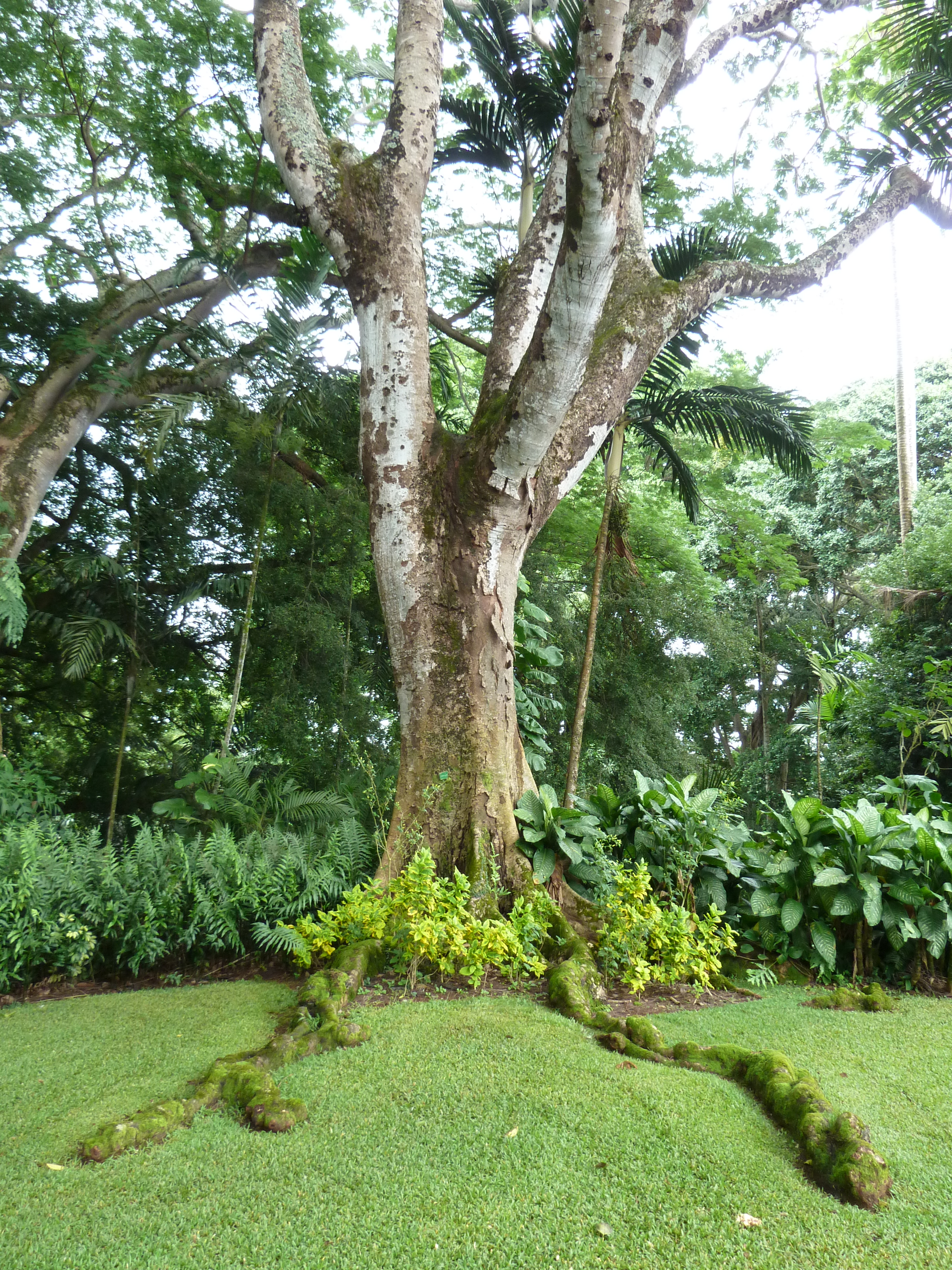
- At Wahiawa Botanical Garden, Hawaii

Scientific classification
- Kingdom: Plantae
- Clade: Tracheophytes
- Clade: Angiosperms
- Clade: Eudicots
- Clade: Rosids
- Order: Fabales
- Family: Fabaceae
- Subfamily: Caesalpinioideae
- Clade: Mimosoid clade
- Genus: Parkia
- Species: P. javanica

Binomial name
- Parkia javanica Lam.

Synonyms
- Parkia javanica (Lamk.) Merr. 1918; Gleditsia javanica Lamk. 1788; Acacia javanica DC. 1825; Mimosa biglobosa Roxb. 1832, non Jacq.; Parkia roxburghii G. Don 1832

= Parkia javanica =

Species of plant

Parkia javanica Lam., syn. Parkia roxburghii G. Don. (Indonesian: kedaung, Javanese: kedhawung, Filipino: cupang) is a plant of the genus Parkia in the family Mimosaceae.

== Description ==
Parkia javanica is a middle-sized, unarmed tree that can reach a height of up to 30 meters, characterized by spreading branches and brown, pubescent twigs. The leaves are alternate, compound, and bipinnate, with a long petiole that often contains glands below the lower pair of pinnae and a few between the upper pinnae. The pinnae vary from 8 to 30 pairs, while the leaflets, numbering 40 to 80 pairs, are closely set, sessile, linear-oblong in shape, and falcate (sickle or scythe shaped), with a base that appears as if cut off by a straight transverse line (truncate). The leaf base is often swollen, forming a pulvinus.

The tree’s inflorescence is racemose, featuring dense, clavate heads with sterile flowers lower down, on long peduncles measuring 30 to 40 cm. The receptacle of the inflorescence is narrowed into a 2.5–3 cm long stalk. The small, pale yellow flowers are complete, bisexual, regular, actinomorphic, hypogynus, pentamerous, and thalamus slightly cup shaped, with silky pubescent bracts on the outside. The calyx comprises five sepals that are gamosepalous, tubular, and imbricate, which is unique to the genus within the Mimosaceae family (which is usually valvate).

The corolla consists of five pale yellow petals that are fused at the base, forming a short tube, cleft halfway down and valvate. The androecium has 10 monadelphous stamens with filiform filaments, and united in the lower part with each other, exserted; anthers narrow, without apical glands, versatile. The gynoecium is monocarpellary with a superior ovary and a single, filiform style. The fruit is a linear, subsucculent, flat, strap-shaped pod, measuring 25 to 50 cm in length and 3.5 to 4 cm in width, glabrous, top rounded, base narrowed into a long pedicel. Flowering occurs from October to December, with fruiting from December to April. This species is distributed from India to Taimur and is found throughout Tripura, though it remains scarce in the region.

=== Identification ===
Genus Parkia

I) Stamens 10.

II) Flowers in heads.

III) Flowers without apical glands.

IV) Unarmed mid-sized trees.

V) Monadelphous; Flowers pale yellow.

== Vernacular names ==
Manipuri- zongchak/yongchak ; Bishnupriya Manipuri- longchak ; Bengali- longchak ; Kokborok (Tripuri)-wakreh ; Mizo-zwangtah ; Indonesian-kedaung ; Javanese-kedhawung ; Filipino-cupang ; Chinese- qui hua dou (Taiwan) ; Burmese- mai-karien ; Malaysia- kedung ; Thai- reang/karieng.

== Ethnobotanical importance ==
This plant is known as an important medicinal plant in the herb industry in Indonesia, using mainly the seed. In addition, other parts which are considered medicinal are the bark, leaves and the root. It is most sought after for its anti-bacterial properties and is applied in traditional medicine for infections and stomach disorders.

Some states in the North-East India like Mizoram (where it's called 'Zawngtah'), Manipur (where it's called 'Yongchak'), etc. use its fruit (the bean-liked part) as part of their meal. This bean after having its skin scraped off is eaten raw or cooked by the Mizo and other hill people of north-east India.
