= Spirit of Aloha Oceanfront Botanical Garden =

Nature preserve in Hawaii on the island of Maui

Coordinates: 20.934516°N 156.264849°W

The Spirit of Aloha Oceanfront Botanical Gardens also referred to as The Gardens, is an 11-acre nature preserve located just off the Hana Highway on in Haiku, Hawaii on the island of Maui. It overlooks Ua'oa Bay in the Pacific Ocean and Papanui o Kane Hawaiian island. The historic was originally granted by a Land Commission Award by the Kingdom of Hawaii Department of the Interior in 1848.

The botanical garden is a non-profit organization committed to preserving native Hawaiian plants and nutrition for future generations.

== Aloha Spirit Law ==
The botanical garden is named after the Aloha Spirit Law, a Hawaiian state statute which represents the working philosophy of native Hawaiians. It defines Aloha as "mutual regard and affection and extends warmth in caring with no obligation in return" and states that "the legislature, governor, lieutenant governor, executive officers of each department, the chief justice, associate justices, and judges of the appellate, circuit, and district courts may contemplate and reside with the life force and give consideration to The Aloha Spirit."

== Historic Hawaiian Site ==
The site is registered as a Historic Hawaiian Site by the Hawaii Department of Land and Natural Resources. The property includes original features from its native Hawaiian ancestors including retaining walls used for the cultivation of wetland taro, a historic family burial crypt, and a pre-contact basalt wall modifying the ancient Keali'i Stream.

The site is also a Natural Wildlife Federation Certified Wildlife Sanctuary.

== See also ==
List of botanical gardens and arboretums in the United States
