= Hoʻomaluhia Botanical Garden =

Botanical garden in Kaneohe, Oahu, Hawaii, United States

Coordinates: 21°23′16″N 157°48′29″W

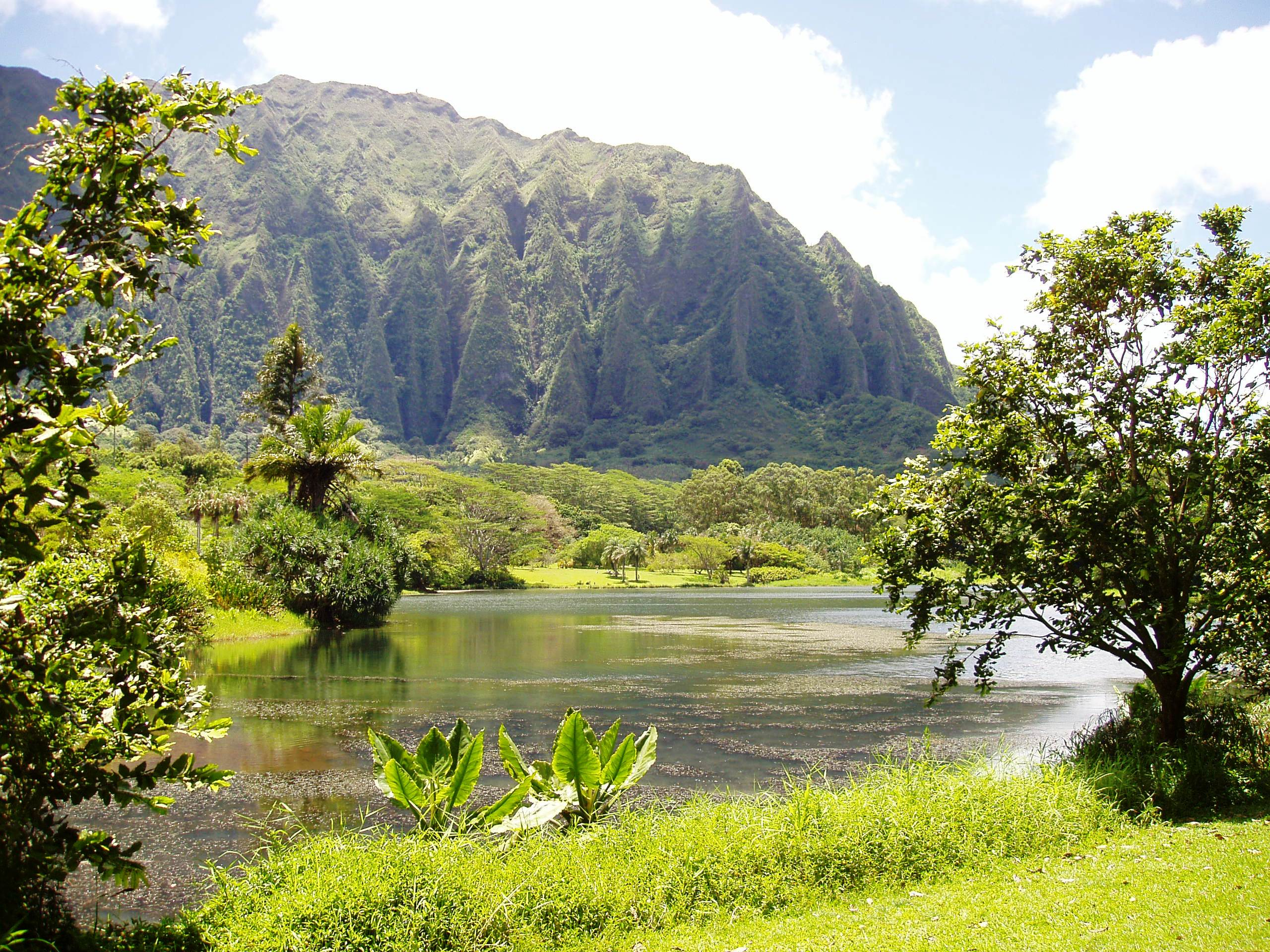
- View of the lake in the garden.
- Interactive map of Hoʻomaluhia Botanical Garden
- Website: Official website

The Hoʻomaluhia Botanical Garden (approximately 400 acres) is a botanical garden located at 45–680 Luluku Road, Kāne'ohe, Oahu, Hawaii. It is part of the Honolulu Botanical Gardens, and is open to the public without charge, except for Thursdays, Christmas Day and New Year's Day.

The garden was established in 1982, and designed and built by the United States Army Corps of Engineers for flood protection. It is a rainforest garden, with plantings from major tropical regions around the world, grouped into distinct collections that focus on Africa, Hawaii, India and Sri Lanka, Malaysia, Melanesia, the Philippines, Polynesia, and the tropical New World.

Special emphasis is placed on conserving plants native to Hawaii and Polynesia, as well as arecaceae, aroids, and heliconias.

The garden includes a lake (32 acres) and walking trails, as well as a day use area, campgrounds, and a visitor center with lecture room, exhibition hall, workshop, and botanical library.

The garden features plants rarely seen in America, such as the Açaí tree.

== Gallery ==
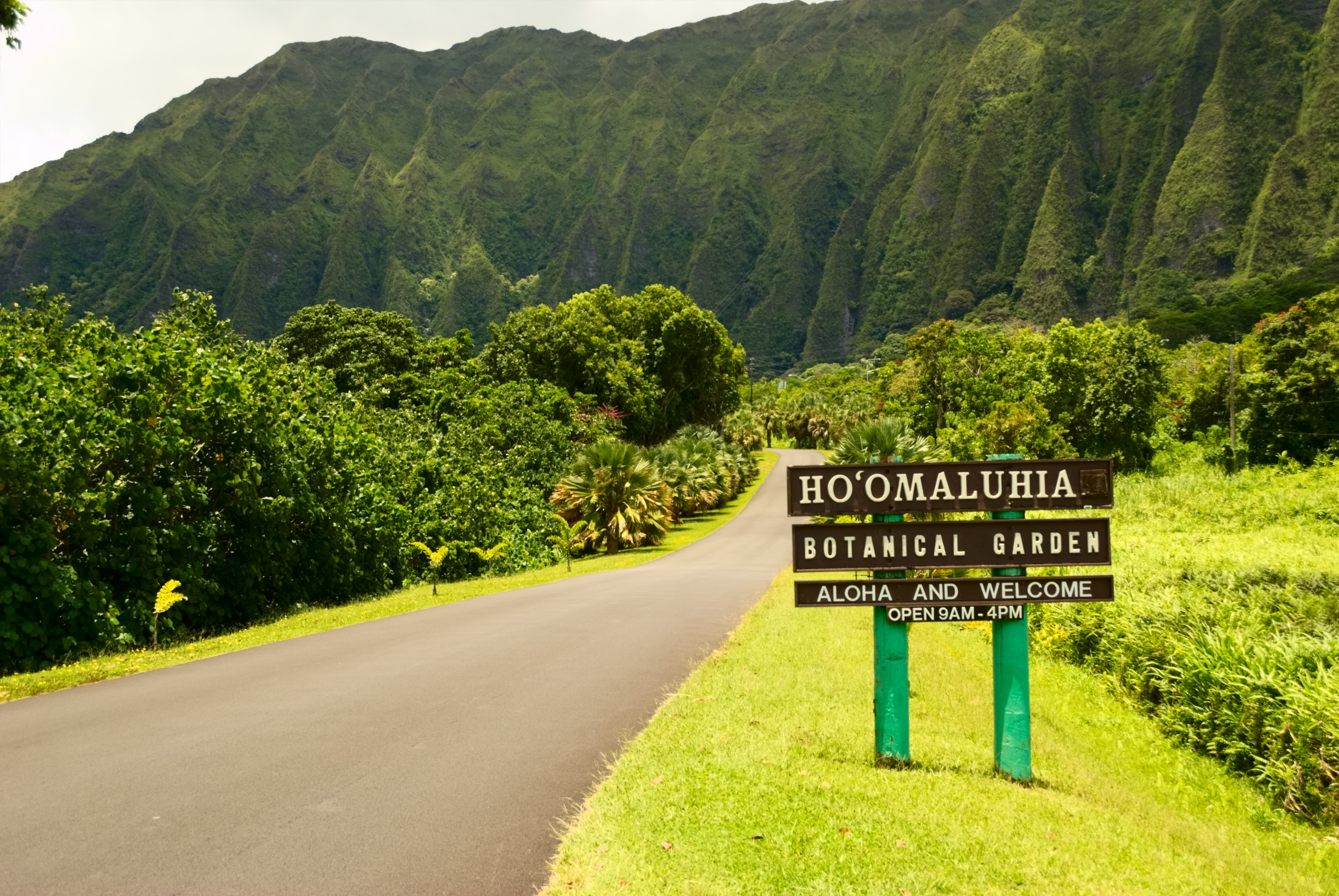
Entrance.

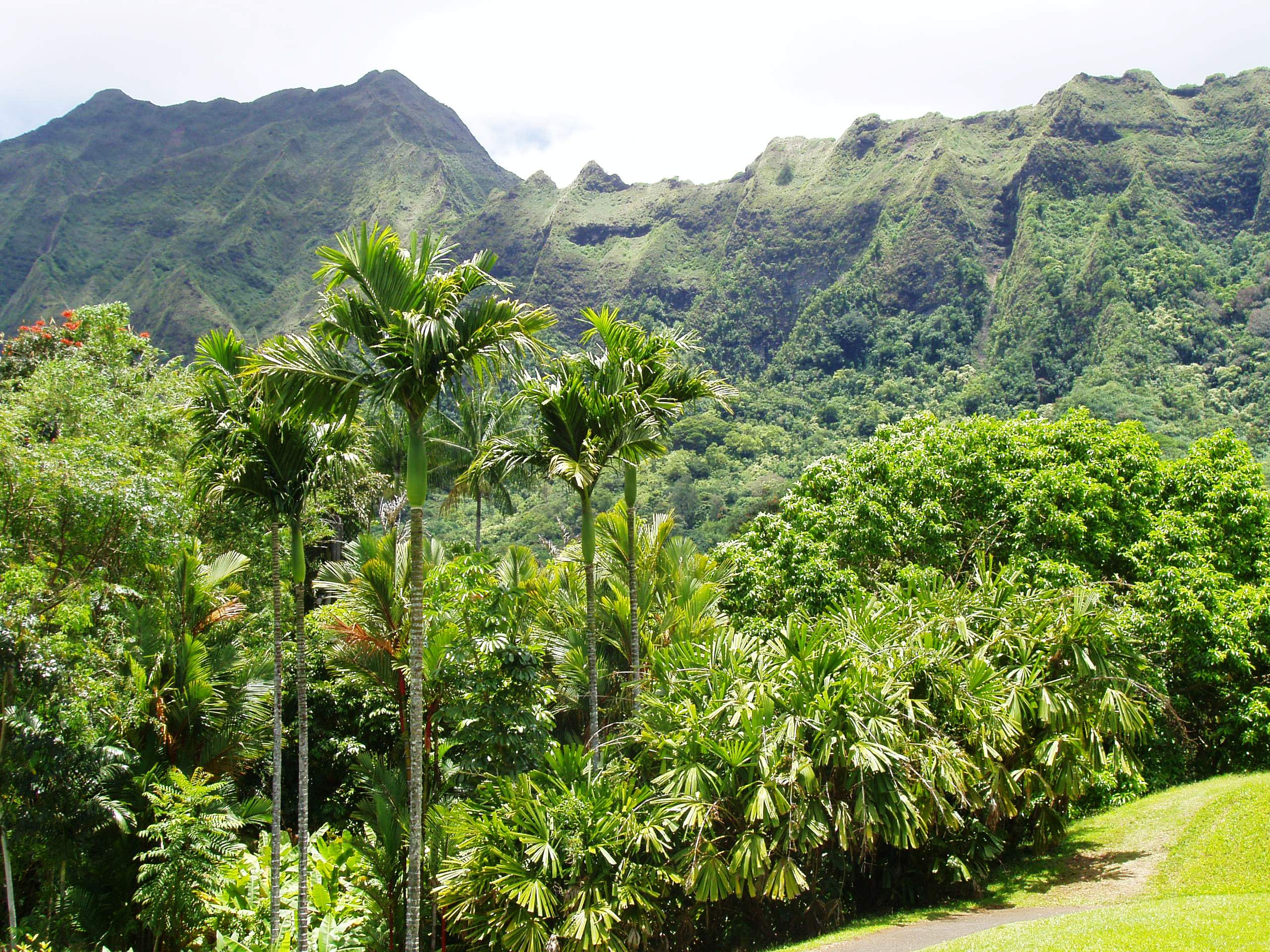
Mountain view.

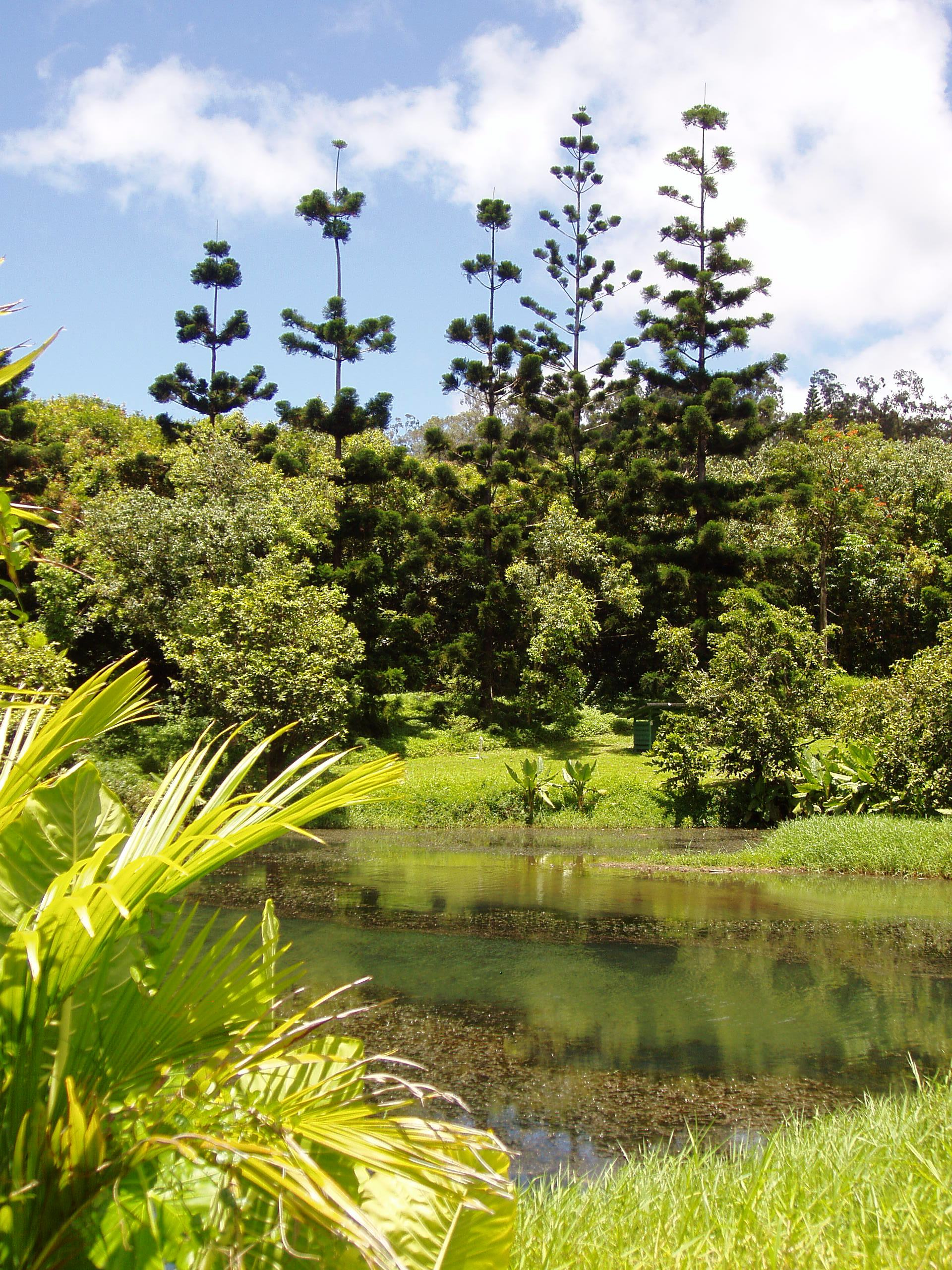
Near the lake.

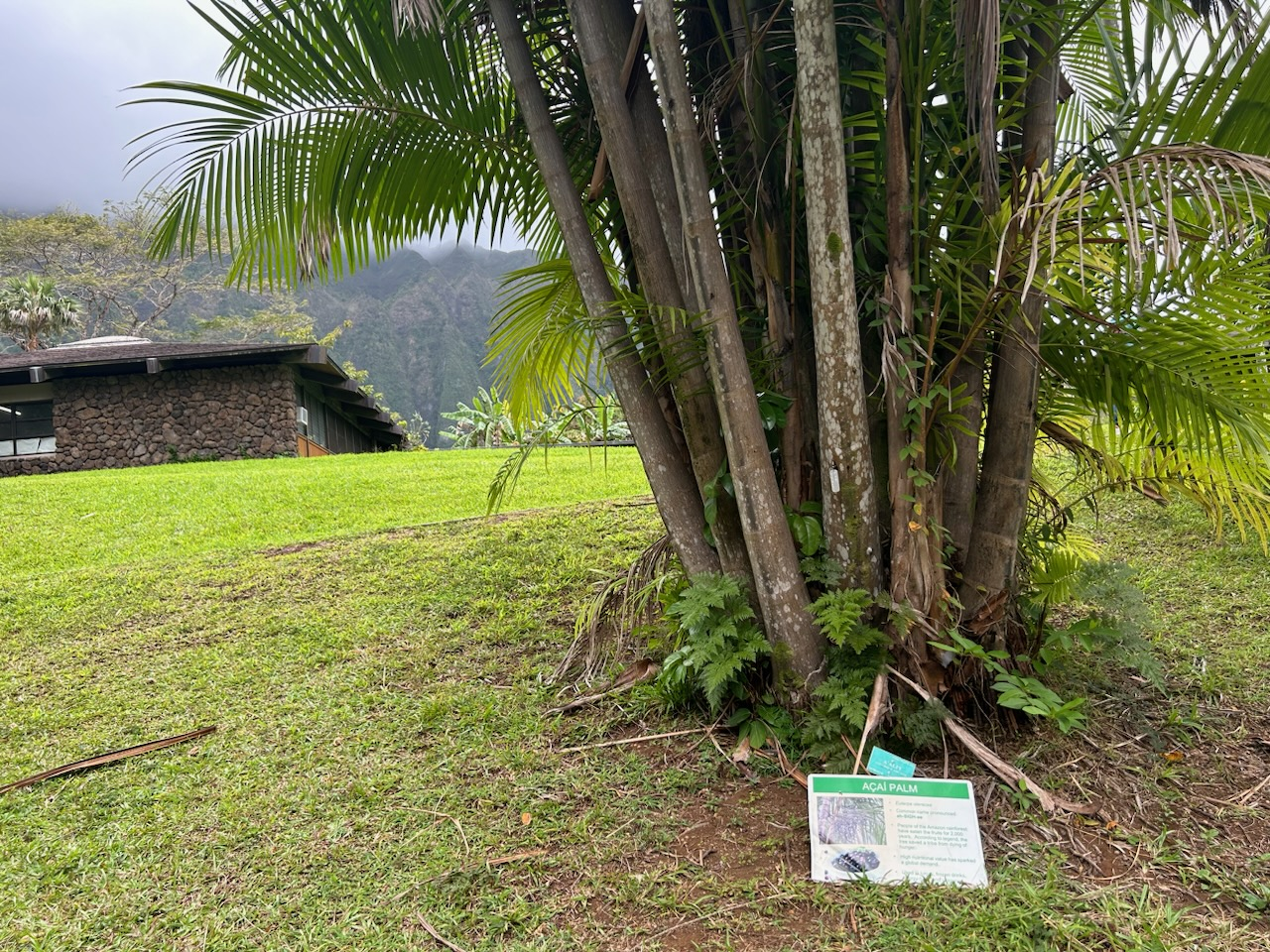
Açaí palm (Euterpe oleracea)

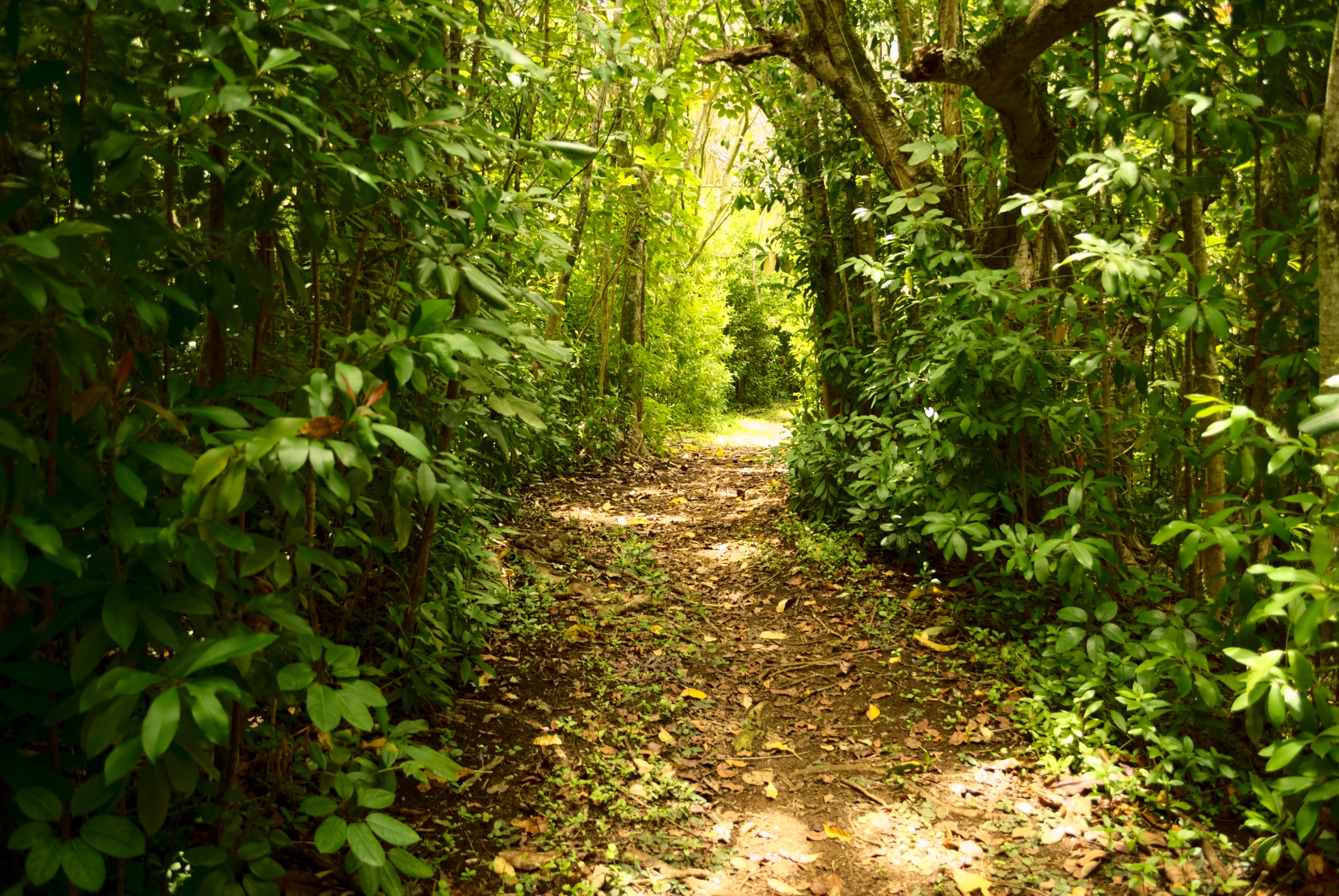
Stream trail.

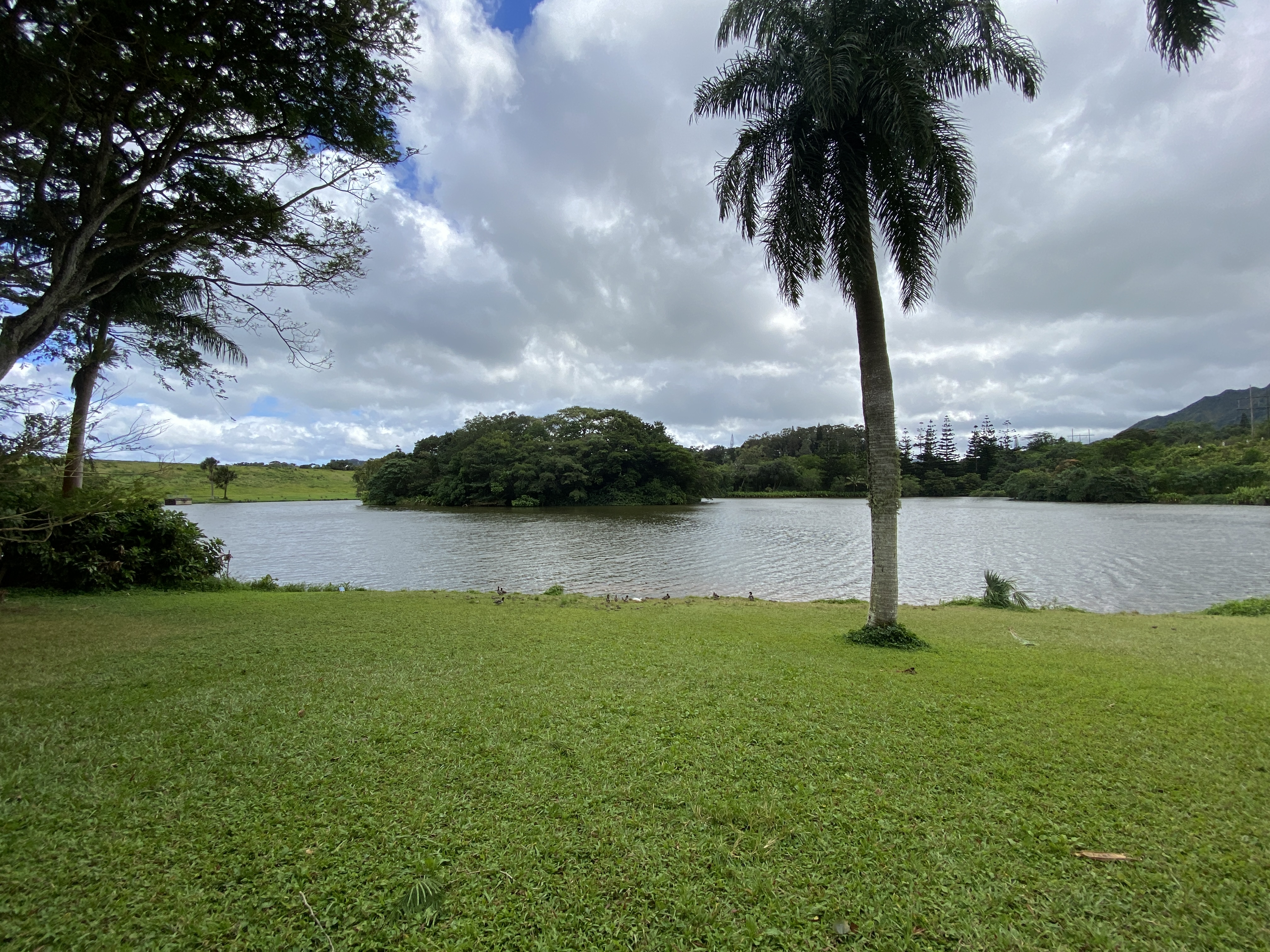
View of the Loko Waimaluhia Reservoir Fishing Area at the Hoʻomaluhia Botanical Garden in Oʻahu, Hawaiʻi.

== See also ==
- List of botanical gardens in the United States
