= Liliʻuokalani Botanical Garden =

Garden

Coordinates: 21°19′N 157°51′W

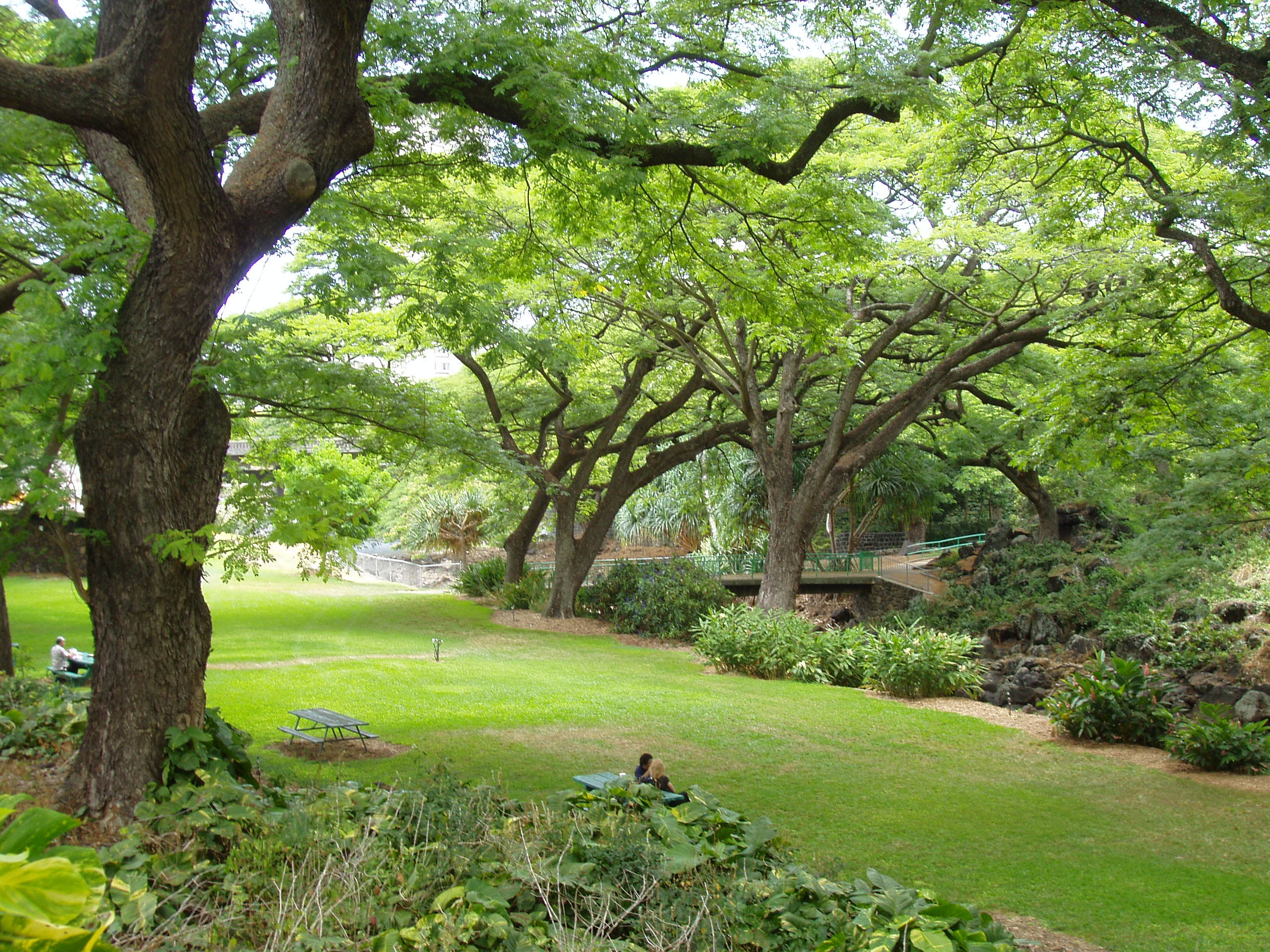
- Interactive map of Liliʻuokalani Botanical Garden

The Liliʻuokalani Botanical Garden is a city park and young botanical garden located on North Kuakini Street, Honolulu, Hawaiʻi. The garden is 7 acres (28,000 m^{2}). It is one of the Honolulu Botanical Gardens, and open daily without charge, except for Christmas and New Year's Day.

The garden's site was given to the City and County of Honolulu by Queen Liliʻuokalani, Hawaiʻi's last reigning monarch, and contains the Nuʻuanu Stream and Waikahalulu waterfall. It is under development to feature native Hawaiian plants exclusively.

== See also ==
- Foster Botanical Garden (close nearby)
- Liliʻuokalani Park and Gardens
- List of botanical gardens in the United States
