= Princeville Botanical Gardens =

Botanical garden in Kauaʻi, Hawaii, United States

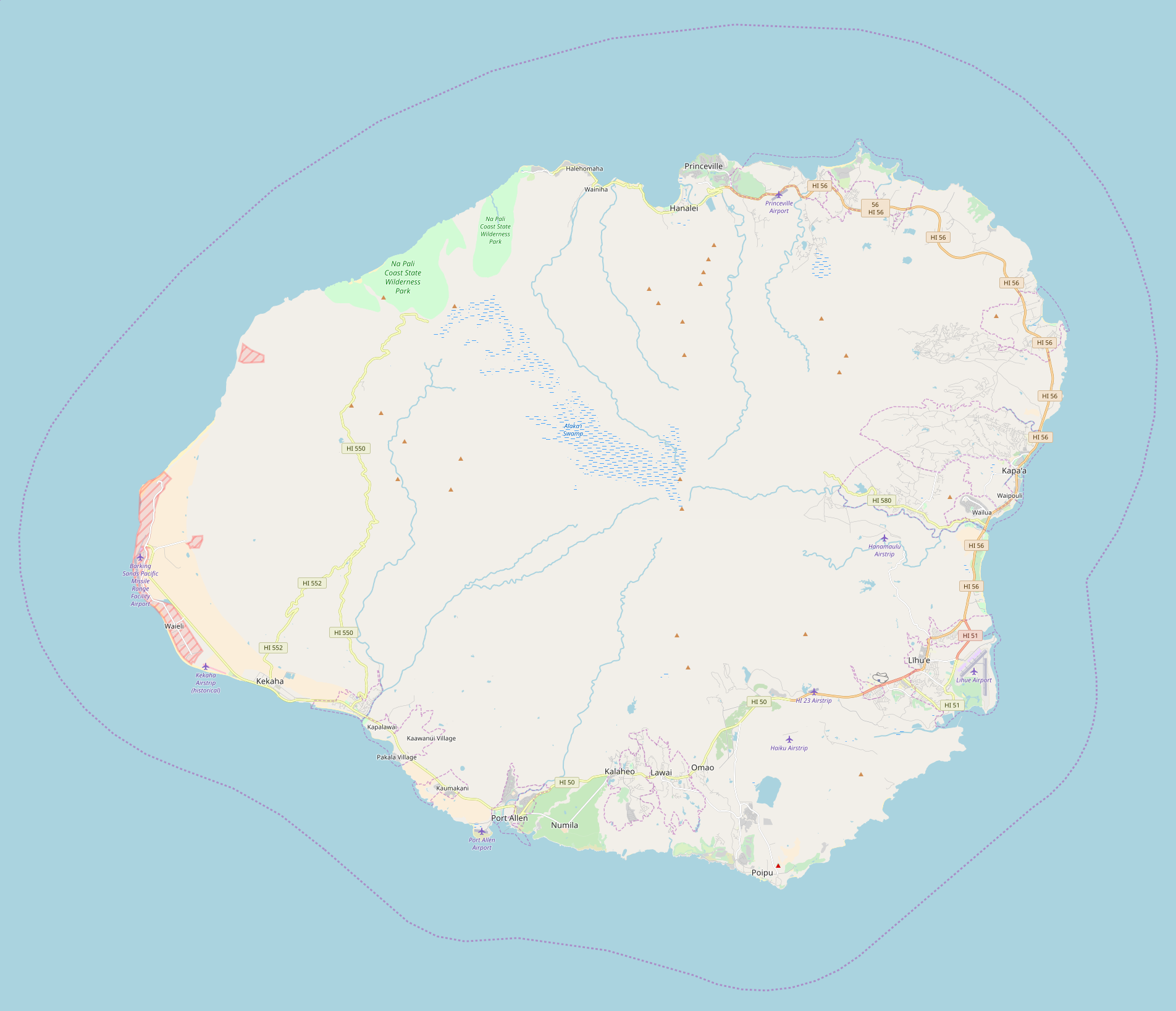
- Location within Kauai Location within Hawaii
- Type: Private
- Location: Kauaʻi, Hawaii
- Nearest town: Princeville, Hawaii
- Coordinates: 22.1975°N 159.4550°W
- Area: 9 acres (3.6 ha)
- Opened: August 2010
- Founder: Bill Robertson; Lucinda Robertson; Jason Robertson; Michael Wise
- Designer: Lucinda Robertson
- Owner: Robertson family
- Open: Monday-Tuesday; Thursday-Friday; 9 AM - 12:30 PM
- Status: Open
- Awards: 2022 TripAdvisor Travelers' Choice
- Species: 600
- Website: kauaibotanicalgardens.com

The Princeville Botanical Gardens are a botanical garden in Kauaʻi, Hawaii, near the Hanalei National Wildlife Refuge and the unincorporated area of Princeville on the island's north shore. It has an area of 9 acres (36,000 m^{2}). The area farms chocolate, honey, and a variety of fruits, giving tours and tastings of them. General admission, however, is unavailable and the gardens must be seen on prereserved tours.

Most of the plants that reside in the gardens are a combinations of tropical, canoe, medicinal, and endangered/rare plants.

== History ==
The botanical gardens, formally a cattle ranch, began in 2001 as a conservation project of couple Bill and Lucinda Robertson, along with their son Jason and friend Michael Wise, who is also the main gardener. It eventually expanded greatly in 2004 when the duo moved to Kauaʻi. Many introduced plants had outcompeted and overtook native ones, causing the Robertsons to protect the area vigorously.

The Robertsons then decided to open their garden to the public in August 2010, allowing guided tours to be held.

== Features ==
A three-hour tour of chocolate informing partakers of the cocoa tree and the history of chocolate is also offered, with gourmet chocolate from all around the globe being available for tasting. Tours do not accommodate for wheelchairs or strollers.

== See also ==
- List of botanical gardens and arboretums in the United States
