= Kula Botanical Garden =

Botanical garden in Maui, Hawaii, United States

Coordinates: 20.7922°N 156.3270°W

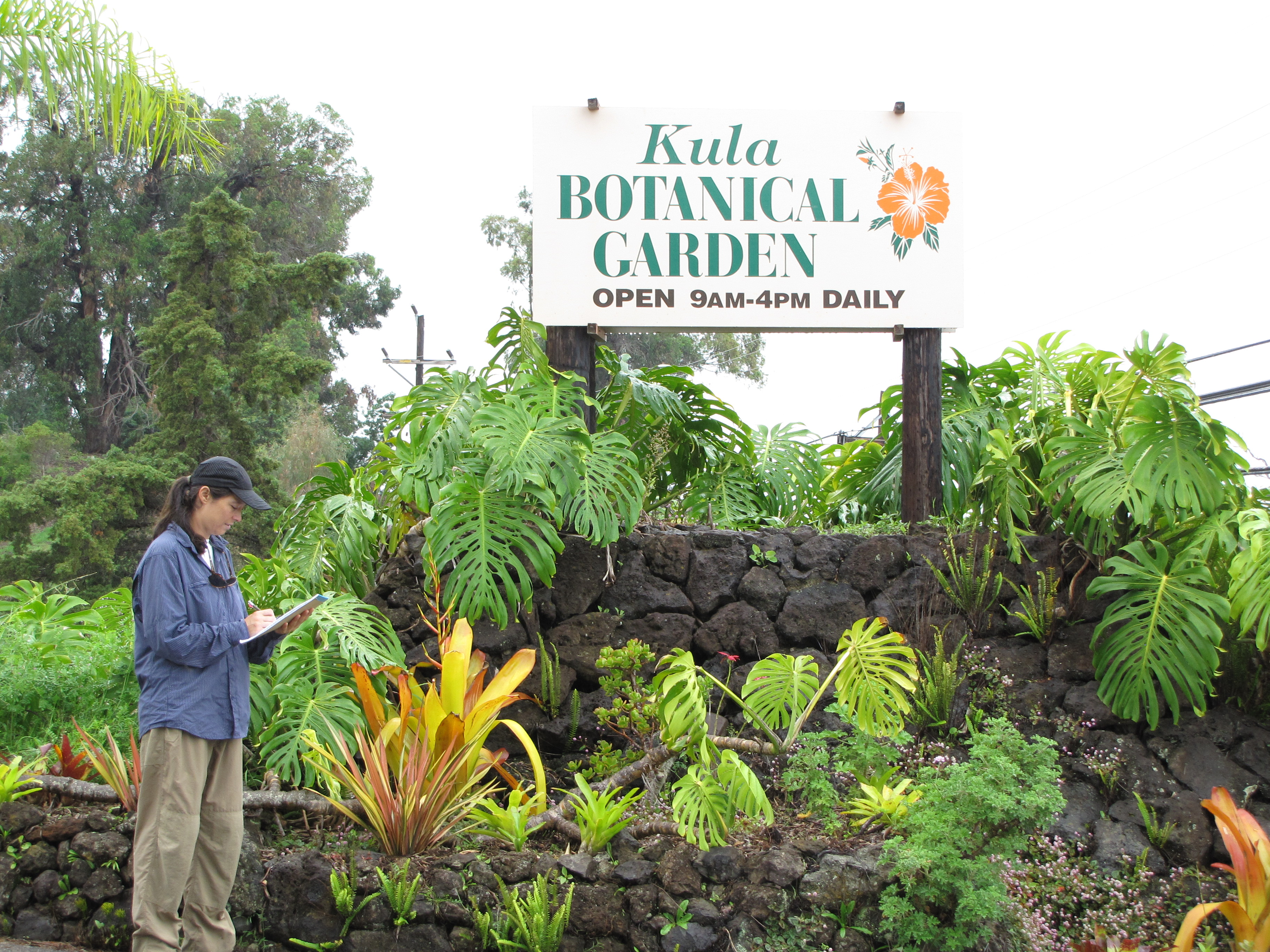
- Interactive map of Kula Botanical Garden
- Website: Official website

Kula Botanical Garden is a 8-acre (32,000 m^{2}) botanical garden located on the slopes of Mount Haleakala on the island of Maui, Hawaii. The garden was created by landscape architect Warren McCord and his wife Helen McCord, who first opened the garden in 1971.

Located on Kekaulike Road near the Kula Highway (Highway 37) junction, the Kula Botanical Garden is open daily and charges admission for adults.

It is a native Hawaiian plant reserve. It was Maui's first public garden. The garden is located near the Haleakalā volcano, at an elevation of 3,300 feet (1,000 m). Both tropical and semitropical species grow here, and the relatively temperate climate provided by the elevation also allows some mid-latitude plants to be established. Today the garden contains nearly 2,000 plant varieties, including collections of protea, orchids, bromeliads, native Hawaiian plants, and trees including koa and kukui. Other features include an aviary, a koi pond, waterfalls, and a covered bridge.

Native birds like ‘Apapane and ‘Amakihi are frequently seen flying around the gardens.

The garden occasionally suffers flood and wind damage when a hurricane or Kona low strikes. Significant damage from Kona storms happened in December 2021 and March 2026.

== See also ==
- List of botanical gardens and arboretums in Hawaii
