= Wahiawa Botanical Garden =

Botanical garden in Oʻahu, Hawaiʻi

Coordinates: 21°30′08″N 158°01′05″W

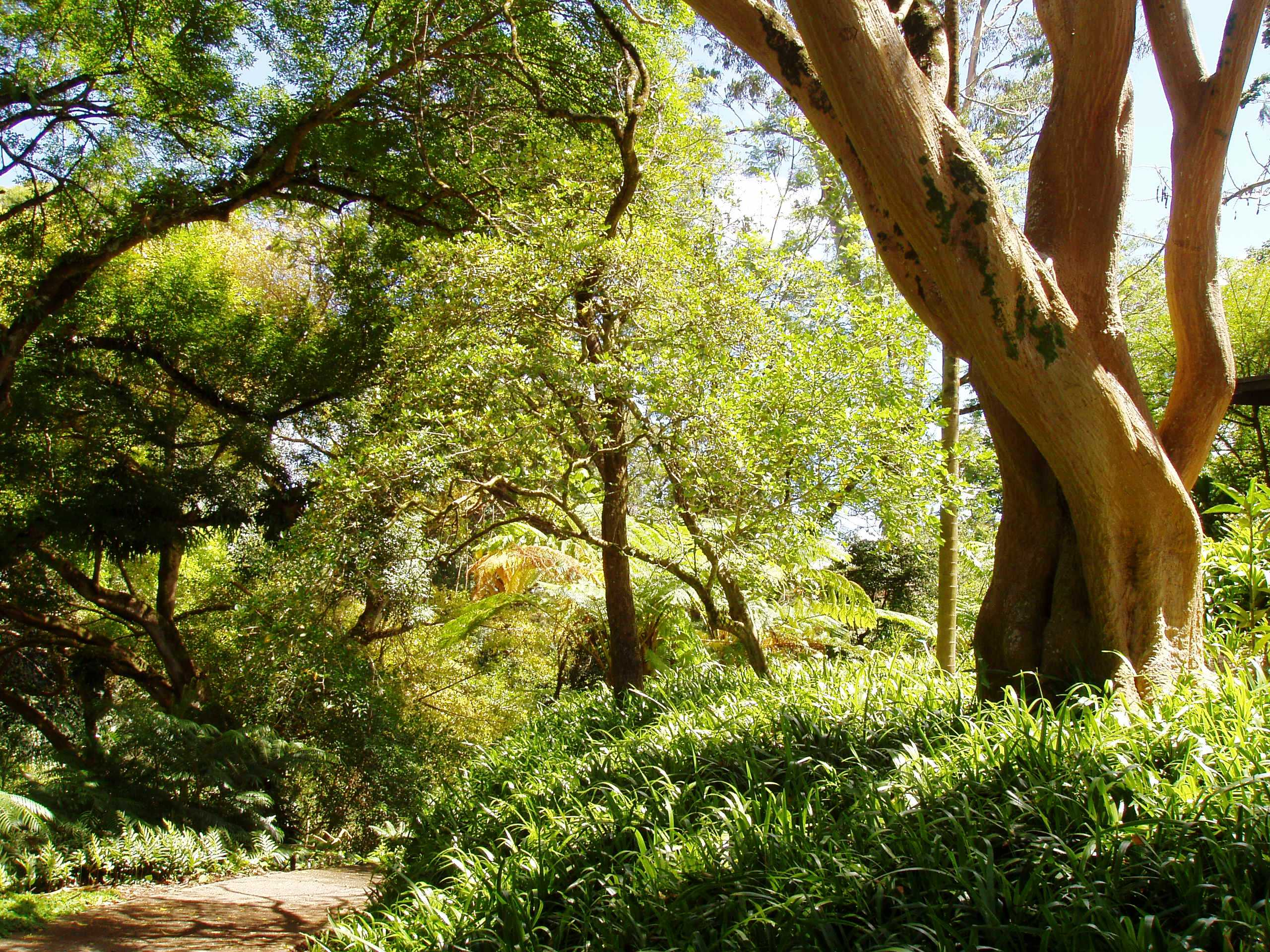
- Interactive map of Wahiawa Botanical Garden
- Website: Official website

The Wahiawa Botanical Garden, 27 acres (11 ha) is a botanical garden on a high plateau in central Oʻahu, Hawaiʻi, United States, located between the Wai'anae and Ko'olau mountain ranges. The garden is one of the Honolulu Botanical Gardens, and home to a collection of tropical flora requiring a relatively cool environment, with emphasis on native Hawaiian plants. The garden is nicknamed the "tropical jewel" of the Botanical Gardens.

The Garden's site began in the 1920s, when the Hawaiian Sugar Planters' Association leased land from the State of Hawaiʻi for experimental tree planting. Most of the Garden's large trees date from that era. The property was transferred to Honolulu in 1950, and opened as a botanical garden in 1957. The garden is open seven days a week, from 9 am to 4 pm.

== Plant collections ==
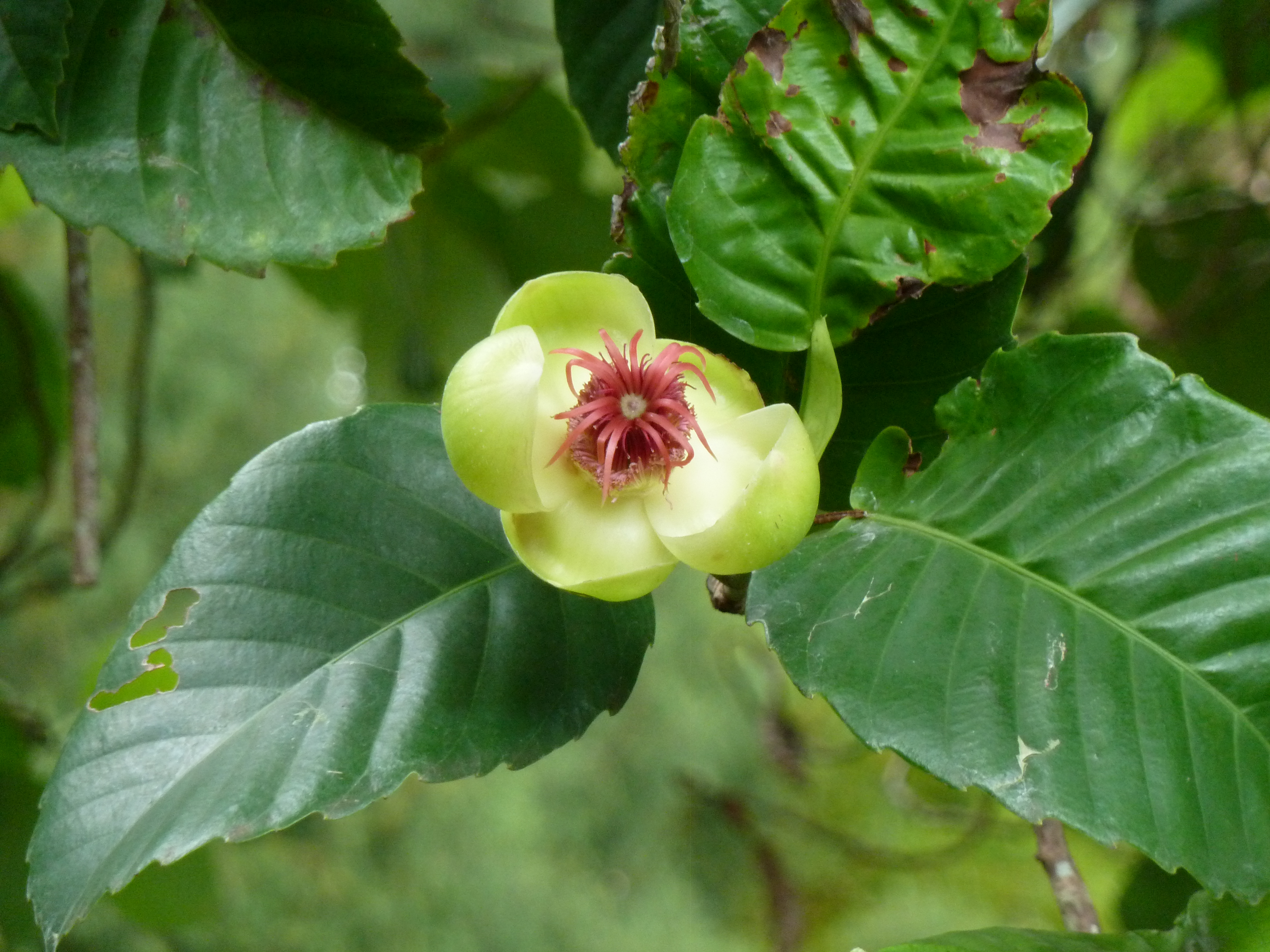
Dillenia philippinensis.

The Garden's collections include: blue ginger (Dichorisandra thyrsiflora), jade vine (Strongylodon macrobotrys)), hāpuʻu ʻiʻi (Cibotium chamissoi), koa (Acacia koa), blue jacaranda (Jacaranda mimosifolia), Nageia nagi, Angiopteris evecta, shaving brush tree (Pseudobombax ellipticum), autograph tree (Clusia rosea), nutmeg (Myristica fragrans), allspice (Pimenta dioica), travellers' palm (Ravenala madagascariensis), Chrysophyllum oliviforme, common screwpine (Pandanus utilis), and Parkia javanica.

The collections also include guanacaste (Enterolobium cyclocarpum), candle tree (Parmentiera cereifera), elephant apple (Dillenia indica), Moreton Bay fig (Ficus macrophylla), Queensland kauri (Agathis robusta), Brownea macrophylla, chicle (Manilkara zapota), camphor tree (Cinnamomum camphora), Mexican cedar (Cedrela odorata), bamboo (Bambusa vulgaris), rainbow eucalyptus (Eucalyptus deglupta), Ochrosia elliptica, ʻIeʻi.e. (Freycinetia arborea), and māmaki (Pipturus albidus).

== See also ==
- Folklore in Hawaii
- List of botanical gardens in the United States
