= Honolulu Botanical Gardens =

Botanical gardens in Honolulu County, Oahu, Hawaii

The Honolulu Botanical Gardens are botanical gardens located in Honolulu County, Oahu, Hawaii, and operated under the county's auspices. The gardens are open daily except for Christmas Day and New Year's Day.

The Gardens' stated mission is to plan, develop, grow, curate, maintain, and study documented collections of tropical plants in an aesthetic setting for the purposes of conservation, botany, horticulture, education, and recreation.

The five individual gardens comprising the Honolulu Botanical Gardens are:

- Foster Botanical Garden
- Ho'omaluhia Botanical Garden
- Koko Crater Botanical Garden
- Liliʻuokalani Botanical Garden
- Wahiawa Botanical Garden
