= Koko Crater Botanical Garden =

Botanical garden on the eastern end of Oahu, Hawaii, United States

Coordinates: 21.2869°N 157.681°W

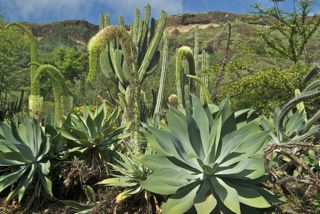
- Interactive map of Koko Crater Botanical Garden
- Website: Official website

The Koko Crater Botanical Garden (60 acres) is a botanical garden located within the Koko Crater (Koko Head) on the eastern end of Oahu, Hawaii. It was given the dual title of the Charles M. Wills Cactus Garden by the Honolulu Department of Parks and Recreation, in recognition of his contributions to the garden, in 1966.

The garden is part of the Honolulu Botanical Gardens, and first established in 1958. Its hot, dry climate is suitable for Plumeria and Bougainvillea cultivars in the outer crater, kiawe (Prosopis pallida) and koa haole (Leucaena leucocephala) trees, and four major collections organized by region (Africa, the Americas, Hawaii, and Pacifica).

Other collections include adeniums, alluaudias, aloes, baobabs, cacti, euphorbias, palms, and sansevierias, as well as a native grove of wiliwili trees (Erythrina sandwicensis). A loop trail (2 miles) runs through the collections. The garden has about 500 trees and 200 species of trees.

== See also ==
- List of botanical gardens in the United States
