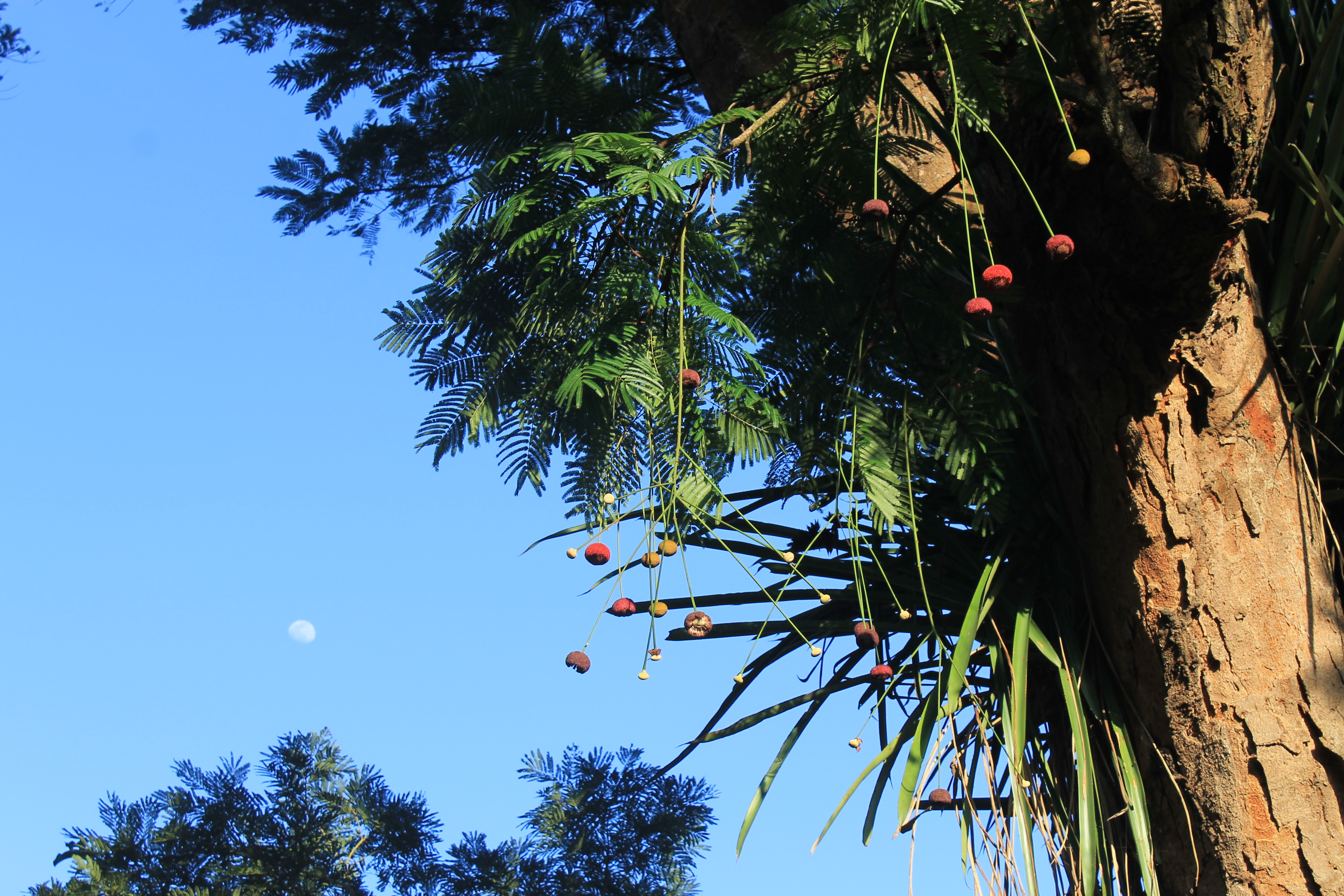

Conservation status
- Least Concern (IUCN 3.1)

Scientific classification
- Kingdom: Plantae
- Clade: Tracheophytes
- Clade: Angiosperms
- Clade: Eudicots
- Clade: Rosids
- Order: Fabales
- Family: Fabaceae
- Subfamily: Caesalpinioideae
- Clade: Mimosoid clade
- Genus: Parkia
- Species: P. pendula

Binomial name
- Parkia pendula (Willd.) Benth. ex Walp.

= Parkia pendula =

Species of legume

Parkia pendula is a species of neotropical evergreen tree found throughout Central and South America. It is part of the Parkia genus, a group of flowering plants that are part of the legume family, Fabaceae.

== Habitat ==
Parkia pendula can be found in primary and secondary forests, from altitudes of 20 to 500 meters above sea level. It prefers well-drained, subtropical environments, ideally thriving on hills or slopes with a 30% incline that experience more than 4000 mm of precipitation annually. They commonly grow alongside Peltogyne purpurea, Caryocar costaricense, and Qualea paraensis.

An adult tree is very flood tolerant, capable of withstanding long-term submersion. Despite this, early seedlings can only survive a few weeks in flooded conditions, limiting the range of environments Parkia pendula can thrive in.

=== Range & distribution ===
Parkia pendula can be found in a variety of countries, mainly Bolivia, Brazil, Colombia, Costa Rica, French Guiana, Guyana, Honduras, Nicaragua, Peru, Suriname, and Venezuela. It grows in many lowland forests, with a large reserve found in a national park in Espirito Santo, Brazil.

=== Threats ===
Insects, specifically certain species of beetles, deposit eggs inside the bud of Parkia pendula, acting as a parasite on the seeds. Despite this, there is no considerable impact on the persistence of the species and the IUCN lists it as a species of Least Concern.

== Description ==
Parkia pendula trees range from 15 to 50 meters in height and can be up to 1.2 meters in diameter. The bark is either whitish-grey or reddish-brown and plated, with many lenticels. The strong, fruity aroma of a blooming Parkia pendula can be attributed to monoterpenes in the flower, specifically the stereoisomers (Z) 𝛽-ocimene and (E) 𝛽-ocimene.

Unlike other Parkia species, Parkia pendula has a flattened and layered crown of leaves. The horizontal branches support alternating bipinnate leaves that come in about 15 to 27 pairs, narrowing to a maximum of 3 leaves whorled about a node. The leaves themselves are dark green and oblong, with curved distal ends.

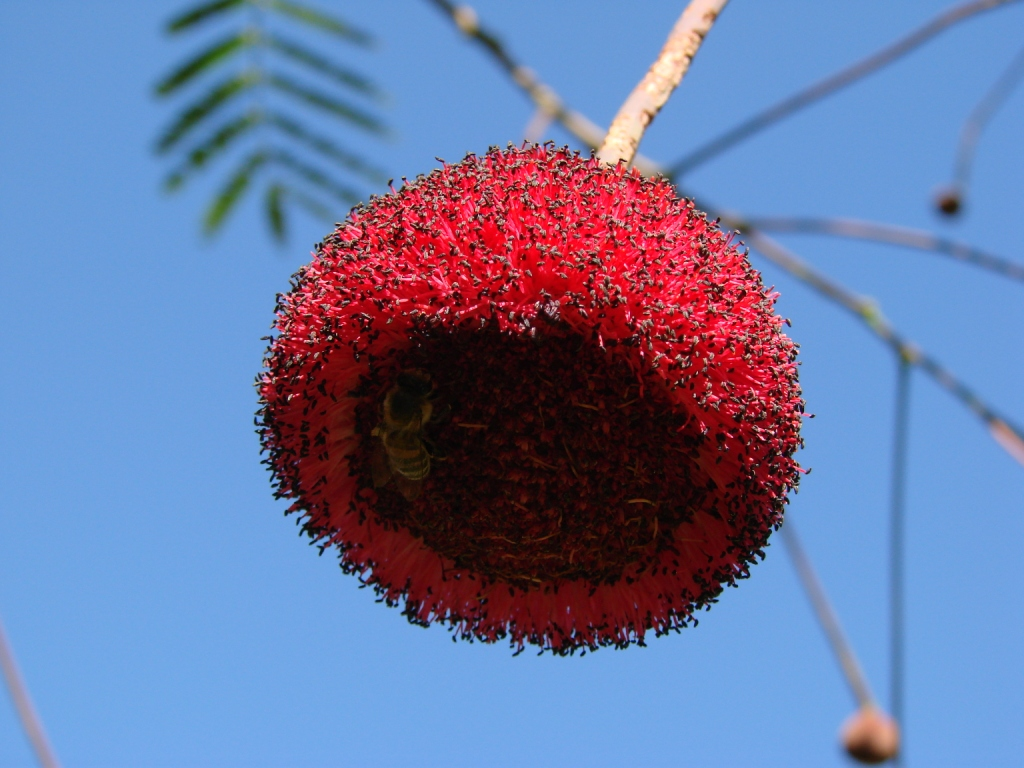

=== Flowers ===
The flowers produced by Parkia pendula grow as inflorescences, particularly pseudanthiums. They have yellowish-pink petals arranged radially. The heads are about to 3.4 cm in length and have a diameter of 4.5 to 4.9 cm. Each pseudanthium contains ~1300 small flowers densely packed around a spherical receptacle. The flowers themselves hang off of thin, woody stems known as peduncles approximately one meter below the crown of the tree. Flowers typically bloom from December to January in Costa Rica, and from January to August in Venezuela.

Fertile flowers have a gamosepalous calyx beneath their corolla and display five distinctive lobes. Each fertile flower has ten androgynous stamen evenly joined at their base, with a single style and several minuscule stigma. Though typically hermaphroditic and containing a single ovary, some flowers are functionally male and lack both ovaries and styles.

Some flowers can produce nectar in large quantities that adheres to the styles. Nectariferous flowers open less fully, despite having a larger diameter than fertile flowers. Nectar is typically produced at dusk after blooming and contains sugar (mainly fructose) concentrations of 20%. The nectar produced contains 14 amino acids, though by quantity proline constitutes 85%.

=== Fruit ===
The fruit/seed pods of Parkia pendula are considered legumes. They are 8 to 30 cm long and 1.9 to 3.2 cm wide. Only a few flowers ever fertilize and develop into seed pods.

Seed pods have a variety of exteriors, whether they are shiny, smooth, dull, hairy, sticky, or some combination of those. The fruit pods are also colorful, ranging from olive or deep greens to reddish brown hues.

Parkia pendula typically fruits in February and July in Costa Rica, from January to November in Venezuela, and in May in Bolivia. Locals are known to harvest the fruits, typically picking them from trees throughout March and April. The collected fruit pods are left outside until they burst and the seeds can be scooped out.

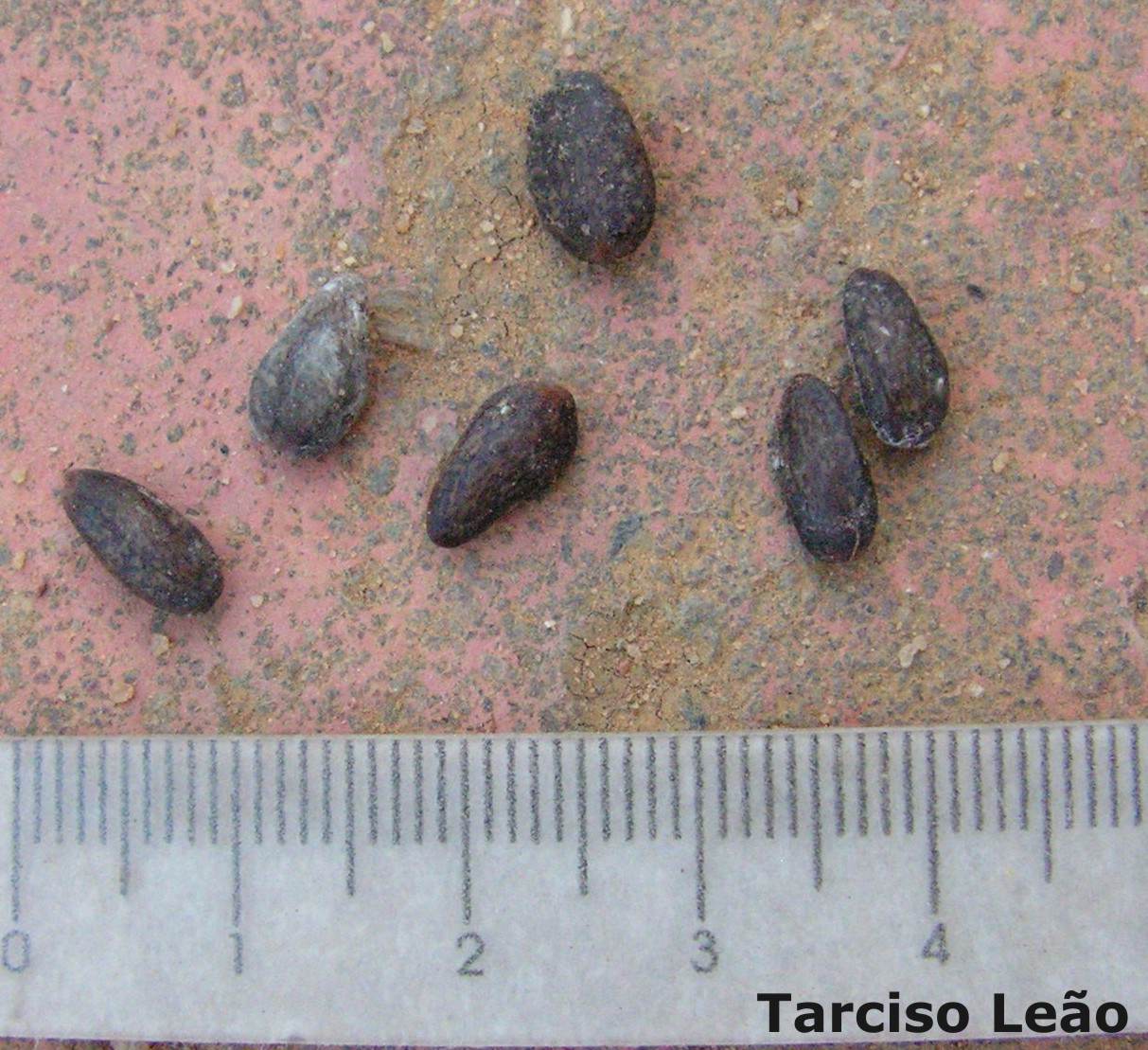
The seeds of Parkia pendula.

=== Seeds ===
The pods of Parkia pendula contain anywhere from 15 to 34 seeds. They have an elliptical shape and are 0.9 to 1 cm in length and 0.4 to 0.5 cm in width. Seeds weigh between 0.06 and 0.11 grams and there are said to be 9848 to 10100 seeds per kilogram of fruit pods.

The seed pod gum of Parkia pendula is extremely sticky due to a high concentration of sugars such as galactose and arabinose. In fact, there are recorded instances of small vertebrates getting caught in the gum and being fatally trapped due to their exposure to the elements and potential predators.

Seeds typically germinate 6 to 19 days after sowing, and anywhere from 36% to 58.5% of seeds actually germinate. Experiments conducted in Brazil showed that by cutting opposite the radicle emergence, scarring the seeds with an abrasive stone, or immersing in sulfuric acid for less than 30 minutes, germination rates would increase.

== Reproduction ==
The Parkia pendula tree exhibits mass flowering, typically with 150 to 200 capitula blooming in one night. The flowers open sequentially from the base to the tip. The capitula appear bright red due to the color of the anthers and filaments, then become yellow-red at dusk when nectar and pollen are produced. When the styles elongate, the plant takes on a purple-red hue, finishing the dramatic color shift all within one night. Flowers are usually shed afterwards within a span of 3 to 4 days.

=== Pollination ===
Like other members of the Mimosoideae subfamily, Parkia pendula exhibits pollen aggregation, specifically polyads. It further differentiates itself from other members of Mimosoideae by having globose polyads rather than flattened polyads from pollen grain layering. Parkia pendula polyads are about 100 mm in diameter and composed of 32 pollen grains, with an outer exine that is grooved. The stigma for each fertile flower only contains a cavity for one polyad, but since the number of pollen grains matches the number of ovules, one polyad can fertilize all the ovules of a flower.

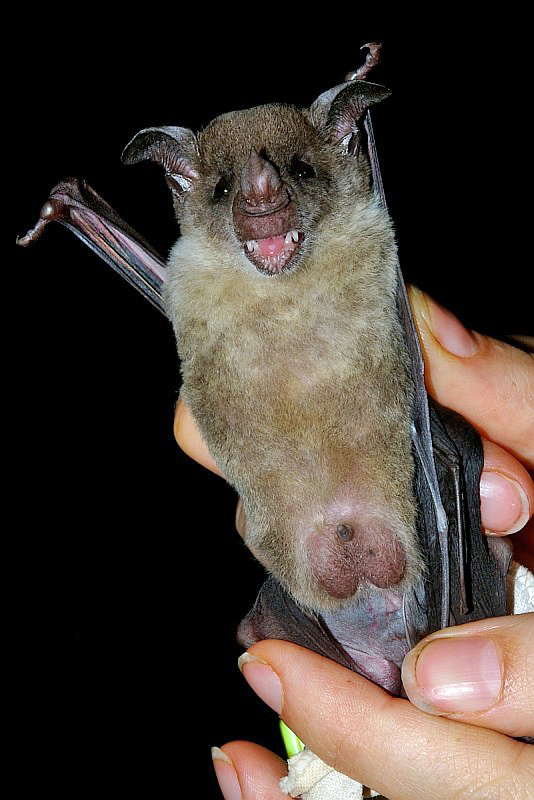
Phyllostomus discolor, a common pollinator of Parkia pendula.

Parkia pendula is chiropterophilous, meaning it is largely pollinated by bats. While a dozen different species have been observed pollinating Parkia pendula, the most common is Phyllastomus discolor. Bats are attracted to the large quantity of nectar produced by nectariferous flowers. When bats land upside-down on the flowers, large quantities of pollen accumulate on the underside of their feet and spread to other flowers. However, some species, like Glossophaga soricina, do not land on the flower and do not facilitate pollination.

The corolla is a key part of pollination, as its round shape and exposed arrangement allows it to be found by bats via echolocation. Typically bat-pollinated plants emit a sulfur scent, but Parkia pendula has no sulfur compounds in its flowers, further substantiating that bats find it by echolocation.

Other pollinators include opossums, kinkajous, porcupines, ring-tailed coati, certain primates, and occasionally bees.

=== Seed dispersal ===
Parkia pendula has a unique seed dispersal mechanism. The seed pods secrete an amber-colored gum, and after bursting, the seeds within get stuck on the gum. It then dries and washes away during precipitation.

Besides dehiscence, Parkia pendula also disperses seeds utilizing animals. Many primates and parrots feed on the gum due to the high concentration of proteins, carbohydrates, and magnesium. These animals will consume and defecate the seeds later on. Additionally, members of the ant species Pachycondyla crassinoda have also participated in seed dispersal.

== Taxonomy ==
The genus Parkia was established by Robert Brown in 1826, notably different from other members of their subfamily Mimosideae due to their fertile flowers having a calyx with five lobes and ten stamen. The genus contains three subsections: Parkia, Platyparkia, and Sphaeroparkia; Parkia pendula is a part of Platyparkia, along with Parkia paraenesis and Parkia platycephala.

== Uses ==
The wood from Parkia pendula is moderately heavy, with a density of 0.57 g/cm^{3}. Processed wood typically has a white or yellow color, with a thick textured grain. It is resistant to fungal infections, but porous enough for preservatives, so it is commonly used in furniture and carpentry.

Due to its high growth rate and capability to attract wild animals while fixing copious amounts of nitrogen, Parkia pendula is perfectly suited to afforestation. It can be planted in degraded, barren environments and serve as a dependable foundation for establishing a forest.

The seed pod gum is also notably used to catch birds.

=== Medicinal use ===
Parkia pendula has been known to treat dysentery, headaches, inflammation, itching, and fevers. The bark has commonly been used by locals to treat stomach aches. Research has been conducted examining the use of lectin as a histochemistry marker to distinguish meningothelial tumors and as treatment for cutaneous wounds in normal and immunocompromised mice. PPeL, the lectin produced when Parkia pendula seeds are purified, binds to cell surface carbohydrates in oligosaccharides and glycoconjugates, expressing cytoplasmic staining which can be used to characterize tumor cell types.
