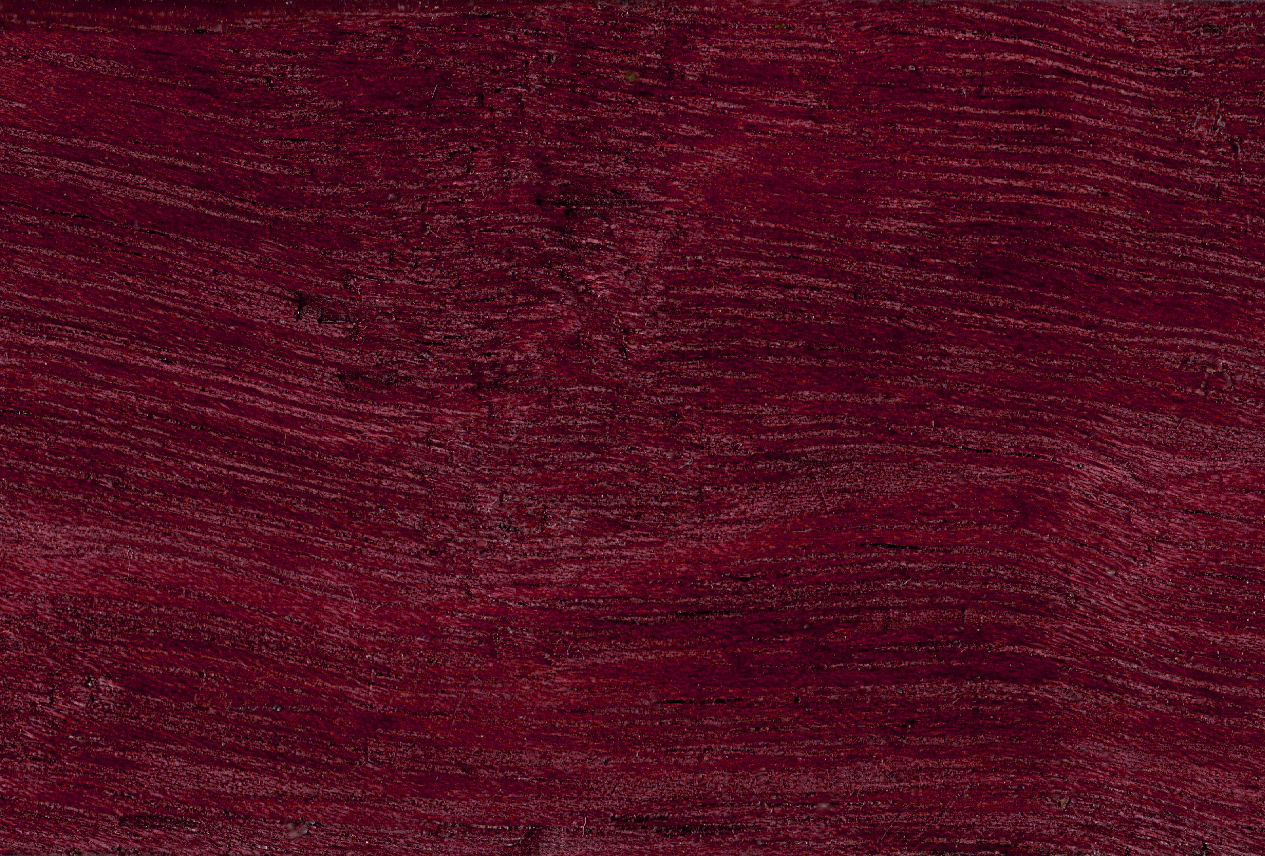
- Peltogyne mexicana wood

Conservation status
- Endangered (IUCN 3.1)

Scientific classification
- Kingdom: Plantae
- Clade: Tracheophytes
- Clade: Angiosperms
- Clade: Eudicots
- Clade: Rosids
- Order: Fabales
- Family: Fabaceae
- Genus: Peltogyne
- Species: P. mexicana

Binomial name
- Peltogyne mexicana Martínez
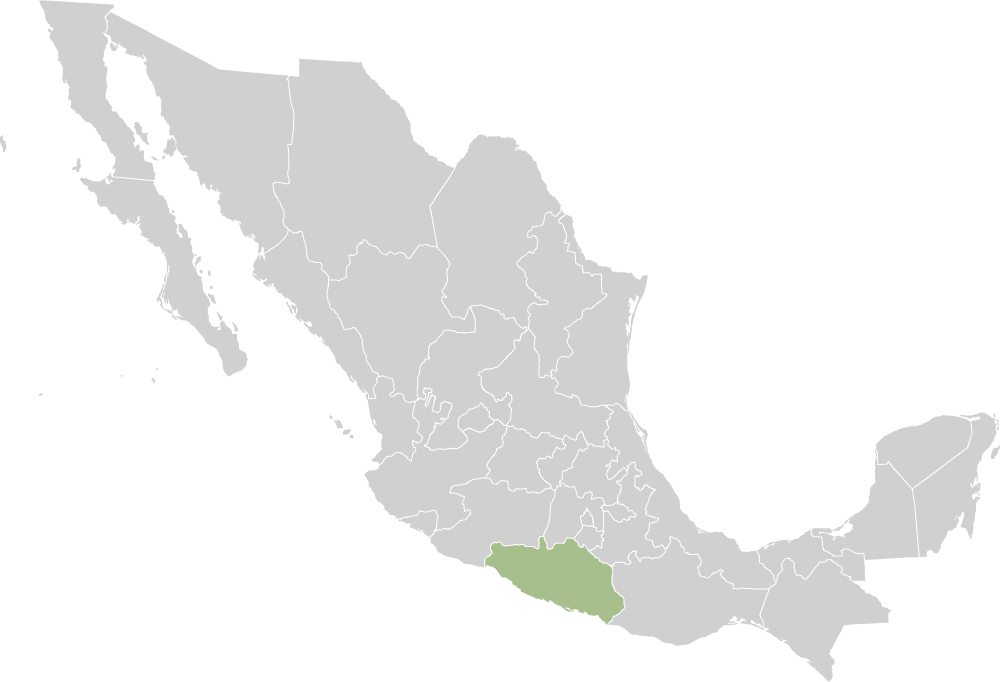
- Natural range of the Peltogyne mexicana species

= Peltogyne mexicana =

Species of legume

Peltogyne mexicana is a species of tree that belongs to the family Fabaceae. Members of the genus Peltogyne are commonly known in different regions as purpleheart, morao, nazareno, violeta, pau roxo, or palo morado. The genus Peltogyne is neotropical and is made up of 23 species. Peltogyne mexicana occurs in Guerrero, Mexico, and is one of the northernmost species in the genus.

Many of the vernacular names derive from the characteristic of the color of the wood, which is unusually purple in the center. The coloration darkens and intensifies with exposure to air and ultraviolet (UV) light; if it is put in water for a few hours, the purple color changes to intense black. Peltogyne mexicana is considered a precious wood.

== Classification and description ==
The flowers are grouped in inflorescences, from 5 to 8 cm, with peduncles and densely ferruginous-pubescent pedicels. The flowers are white, aromatic, 8 mm in diameter, with the surface covered with beautiful whitish; with four sepals of which only three are visible outside the button, slightly violet or chestnut colored, 3 mm; with five elliptical petals 5 mm long by 2 to 2.5 wide; with 10 stamens, of which five are greater than 7 mm and alternate with the others (5 to 6 mm), are all fertile, with white filaments. The fruit is oblique, compressed, from 3 to 4 cm, with the apex rounded. It is usually covered by a kind of very sticky sap. It flowers in August and is pollinated by insects.

== Distribution and environment ==
This tree was reported as a new botanical species by Maximino Martínez in 1960.

The distribution of P. mexicana is in Guerrero, Mexico. P. mexicana is a geographic outlier, with most other members of the genus found in South America.

== Wood ==
This species is prized for its beautiful heartwood which, when cut, quickly turns from a light brown to a rich purple color. Exposure to ultraviolet (UV) light darkens the wood to a brown color with a slight hue of the original purple. This effect can be minimized by treating cut wood with a finish or sealant containing a UV inhibitor. The dry timber is very hard, stiff, and dense with a specific gravity of 0.86 (860 kg/m^{3} or 54 lb/cu ft). Purpleheart is correspondingly difficult to work with.

=== Uses and hazards ===
Purpleheart is prized for use in fine inlay work, especially on musical instruments, guitar fret boards, woodturning, cabinetry, flooring, and furniture. The timber is also valuable in applications that require toughness, such as truck decking.

Exposure to the dust, generated by cutting and sanding purpleheart, can cause irritation and nausea, possibly due to the presence of dalbergione (neoflavonoid) compounds in the wood, limiting purpleheart's use for crafts. Purpleheart is also a fairly expensive wood, which is why it is usually used in smaller-scale projects.

== State of conservation ==
This species has a category of Endangered species (A) according to NOM-059-ECOL-2010, caused in part by overexploitation and deforestation and compounded by its slow growth.

== Gallery ==
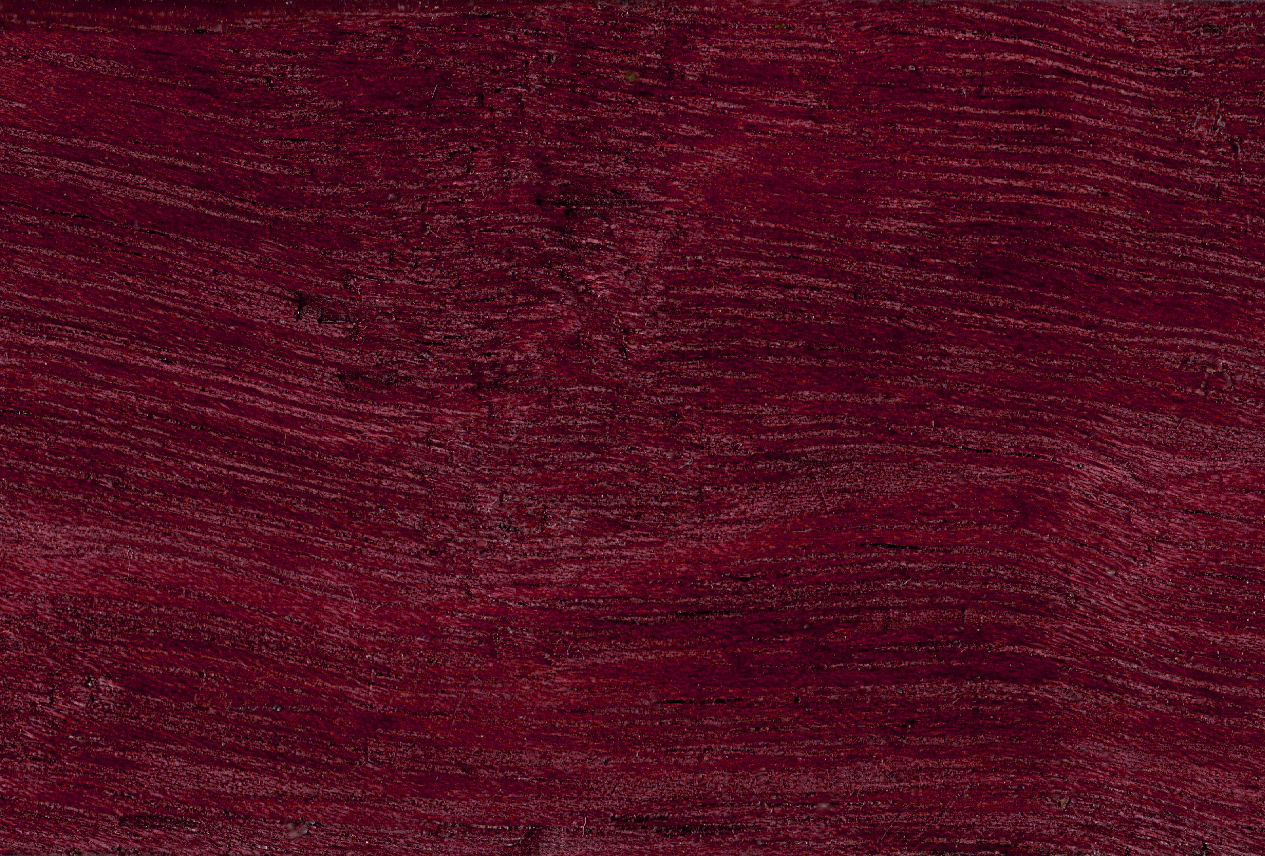
Example of P. mexicana heartwood
