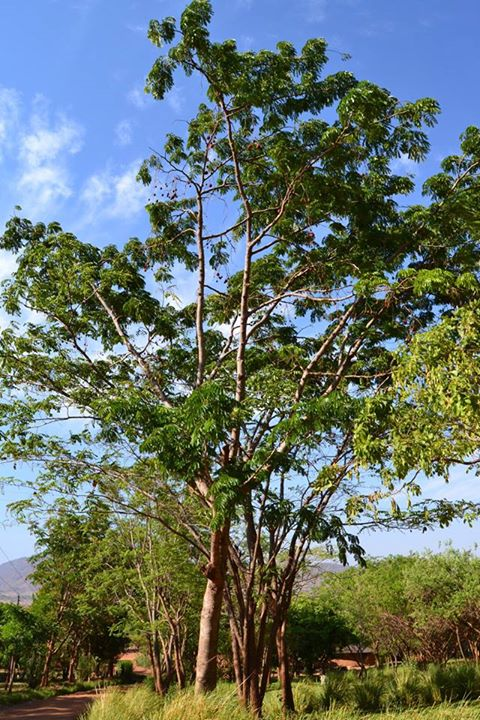

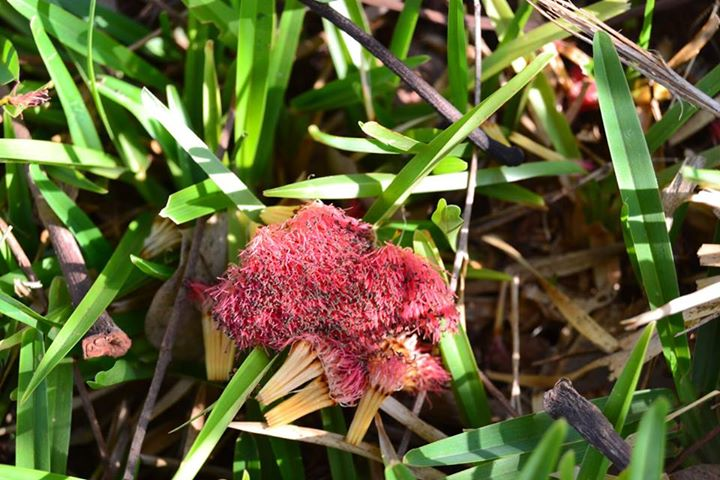
- Cross-section of flower

Conservation status
- Least Concern (IUCN 3.1)

Scientific classification
- Kingdom: Plantae
- Clade: Tracheophytes
- Clade: Angiosperms
- Clade: Eudicots
- Clade: Rosids
- Order: Fabales
- Family: Fabaceae
- Subfamily: Caesalpinioideae
- Clade: Mimosoid clade
- Genus: Parkia
- Species: P. filicoidea

Binomial name
- Parkia filicoidea Oliv.

Synonyms
- Parkia bussei Harms; Parkia hildebrandtii Harms

= Parkia filicoidea =

Species of legume

Parkia filicoidea, or African locust bean ('filicoidea' - fern-like foliage), is a large, spreading flat-crowned tree to 30 metres tall, the bole of which may be narrowly buttressed to a height of about 3 metres, and up to 120 cm DBH. It occurs in wet evergreen or semi-deciduous forest, sometimes on forest fringes, riverbanks and lakes, termite mounds, at elevations up to 1000 metres from Côte d'Ivoire, east to Sudan and Somalia, Uganda, Kenya, Malawi and south to Angola, Zambia, Zimbabwe and Mozambique. Bark on trunk scaly or smooth, grey to yellow-brown, branchlets glabrous to puberulous.

Upper surface of leaf petiole usually with 2 narrow glands; rhachis puberulous; 4–11 pinna pairs; 11–17 pinnule pairs, oblong, rounded at apex, asymmetrically rounded or subtruncate at base, averaging 1.2–3.2 cm. long, 5–12 mm. wide, glabrous but slightly puberulous near base, 2 longitudinal nerves more distinct than the others.

Its flowers are unusual in being pendant on long stalks - 9–52 cm. long - in densely-packed claviform heads of about 7 cm diameter, brick-red to reddish-pink, with a pungent smell. The ensuing black, shiny, pods form in bunches, are 25–80 cm long and 2–4 cm wide, and enclose a dry, powdery, yellowish-orange pulp, eaten as a snack or made into a yellow meal, and in which are embedded some 20 dark-brown seeds. The mature seedpod breaks into segments, which remain connected to one edge of the pod. The tree is often planted as fodder, and also to improve the soil's nutrients. It propagates readily by seed, which having no dormant period will deteriorate rapidly, and should be sown quickly. Seeds freshly extracted will germinate even in the absence of water. Seeds found in elephant and baboon droppings readily germinated.

Seeds are boiled and allowed to ferment, producing strong-smelling, blackish, paste used as a food and seasoning. This smell, caused by lipid changes during processing and storage, is eliminated by frying or roasting. Seeds have a high percentage of protein (32%) and a low fat content (10%). Seed oil is 54% unsaturated fatty acids - the main fatty acids being oleic acid (43%), stearic acid (17%) and linoleic acid (11%).

Parkia filicoidea is briefly deciduous, mostly while flowering during the dry season, though flowering trees have been recorded throughout the year in Kenya and Tanzania. Sterile, nectar-producing flowers, attract pollinating bats at night and squirrels by day. Fruits develop over the ensuing 2 – 3 months. The species is symbiotic with some soil bacteria, forming root nodules and fixing atmospheric nitrogen, part of which is utilized by the plant and the remainder by neighbouring plants. The bark of this species is used in tribal medicine, a decoction is taken to stimulate lactation (galactagogue), as a treatment for malaria, and to ease rheumatism and toothache. The fruit pulp, the leaves and the seeds are also used to feed livestock and poultry.

The timber is white, soft, and easily worked, with interlocked grain and coarse texture, showing a tendency to picking-up during planing. It is not durable and prone to termite, pinhole borer and marine borer attacks. Heartwood is straw-coloured with a pink or green tint, becoming reddish-brown on exposure. Freshly-cut wood has an unpleasant odour.
