= Parkia korom =

Conservation status
- Vulnerable (IUCN 2.3)

Scientific classification
- Kingdom: Plantae
- Clade: Tracheophytes
- Clade: Angiosperms
- Clade: Eudicots
- Clade: Rosids
- Order: Fabales
- Family: Fabaceae
- Subfamily: Caesalpinioideae
- Clade: Mimosoid clade
- Genus: Parkia
- Species: P. korom

Binomial name
- Parkia korom Kaneh.

Species of legume

Parkia korom is a species of flowering plant in the family Fabaceae that is endemic to the Federated States of Micronesia.
