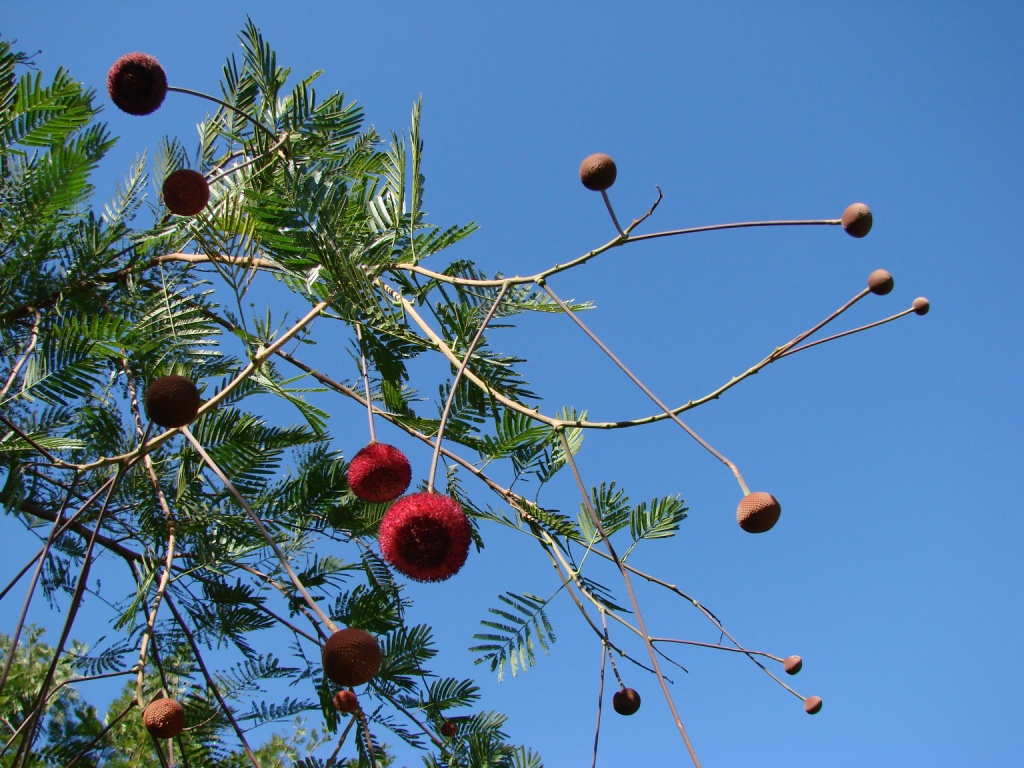
- Parkia platycephala

Scientific classification
- Kingdom: Plantae
- Clade: Tracheophytes
- Clade: Angiosperms
- Clade: Eudicots
- Clade: Rosids
- Order: Fabales
- Family: Fabaceae
- Subfamily: Caesalpinioideae
- Clade: Mimosoid clade
- Genus: Parkia; R.Br.

Species
- See text.

Synonyms
- Paryphosphaera H. Karst.

= Parkia =

Genus of plants

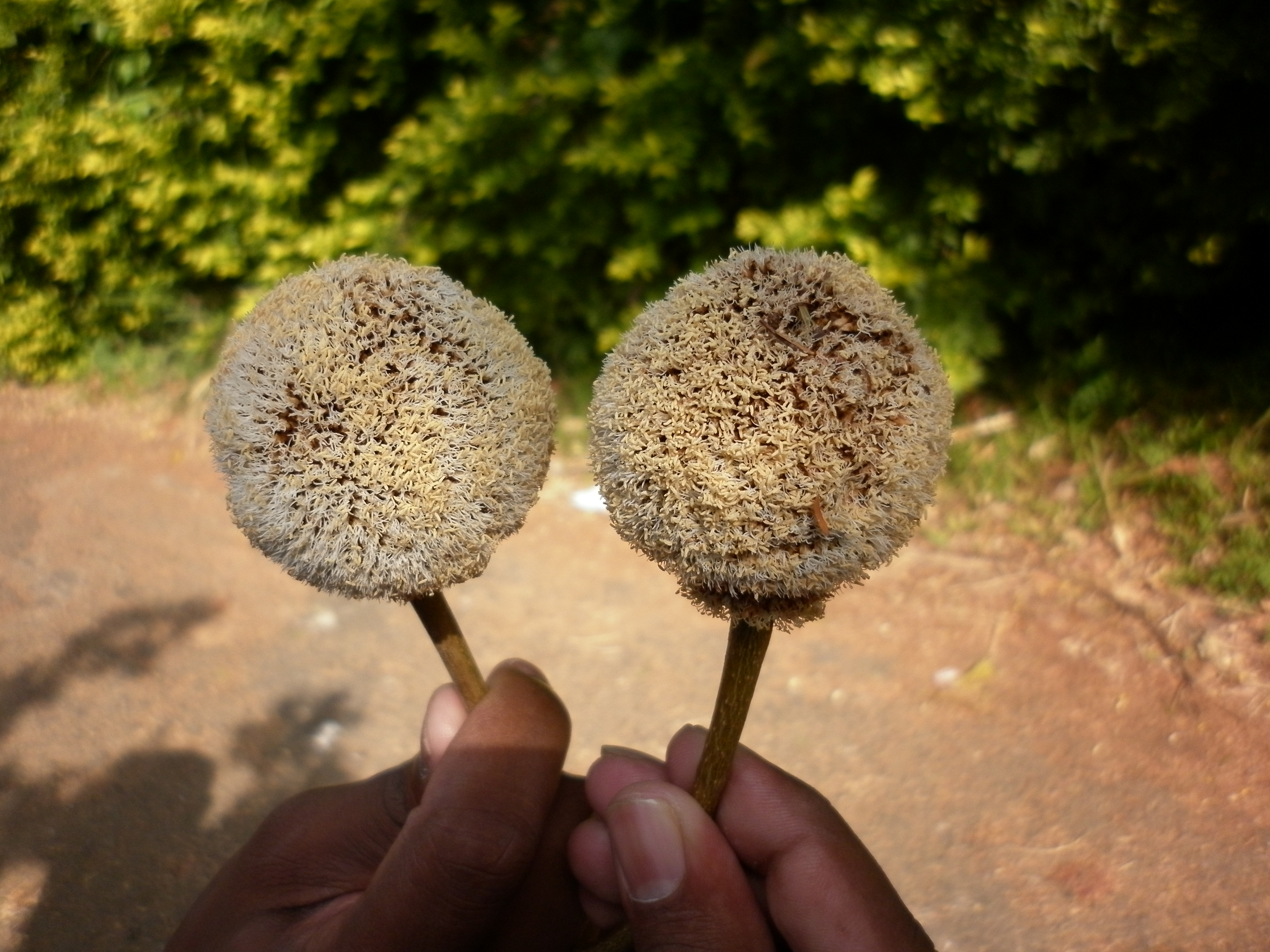
Parkia biglandulosa inflorescence, taken at AC&RI, Killikulam, India

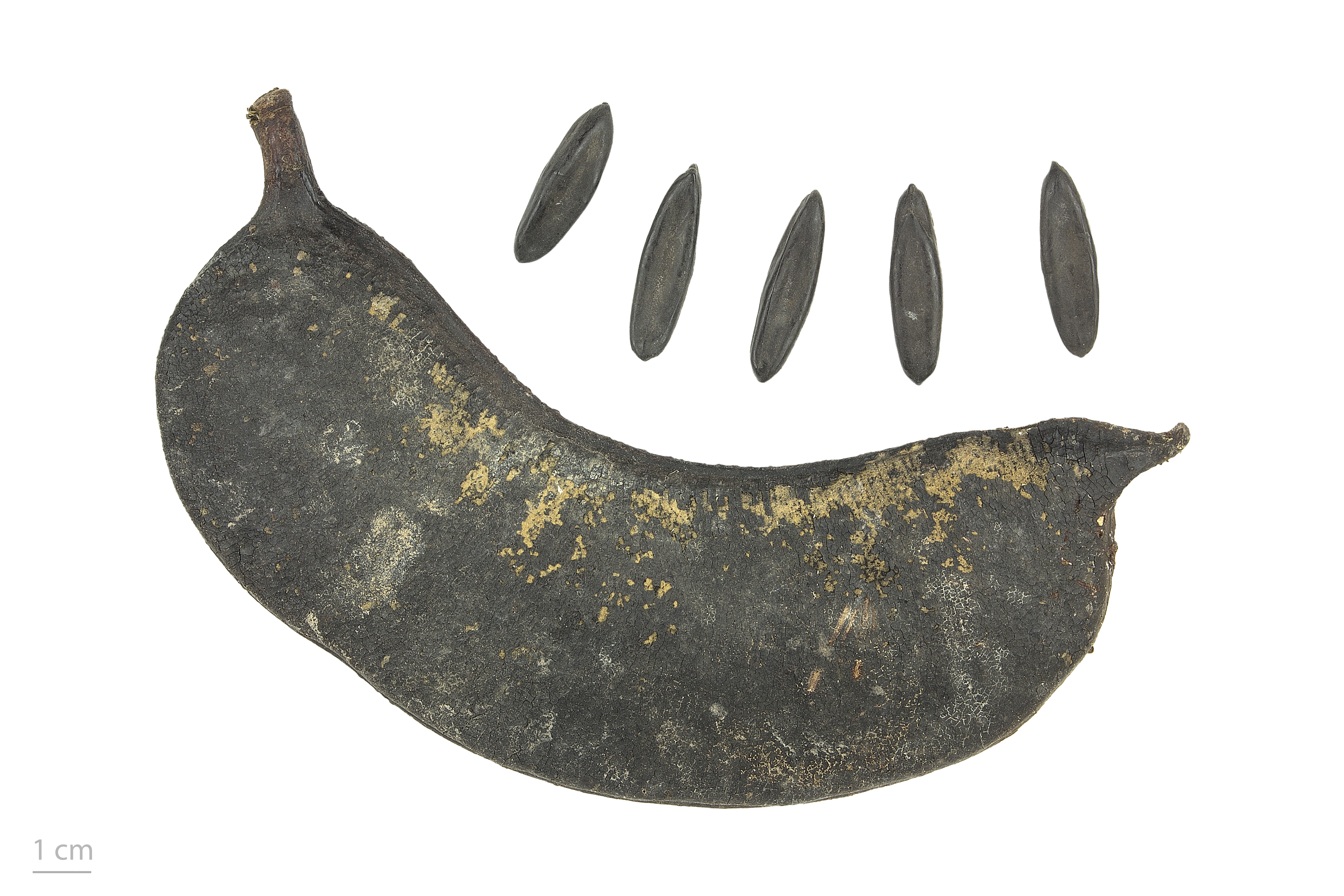
Parkia multijuga seed pod, MHNT

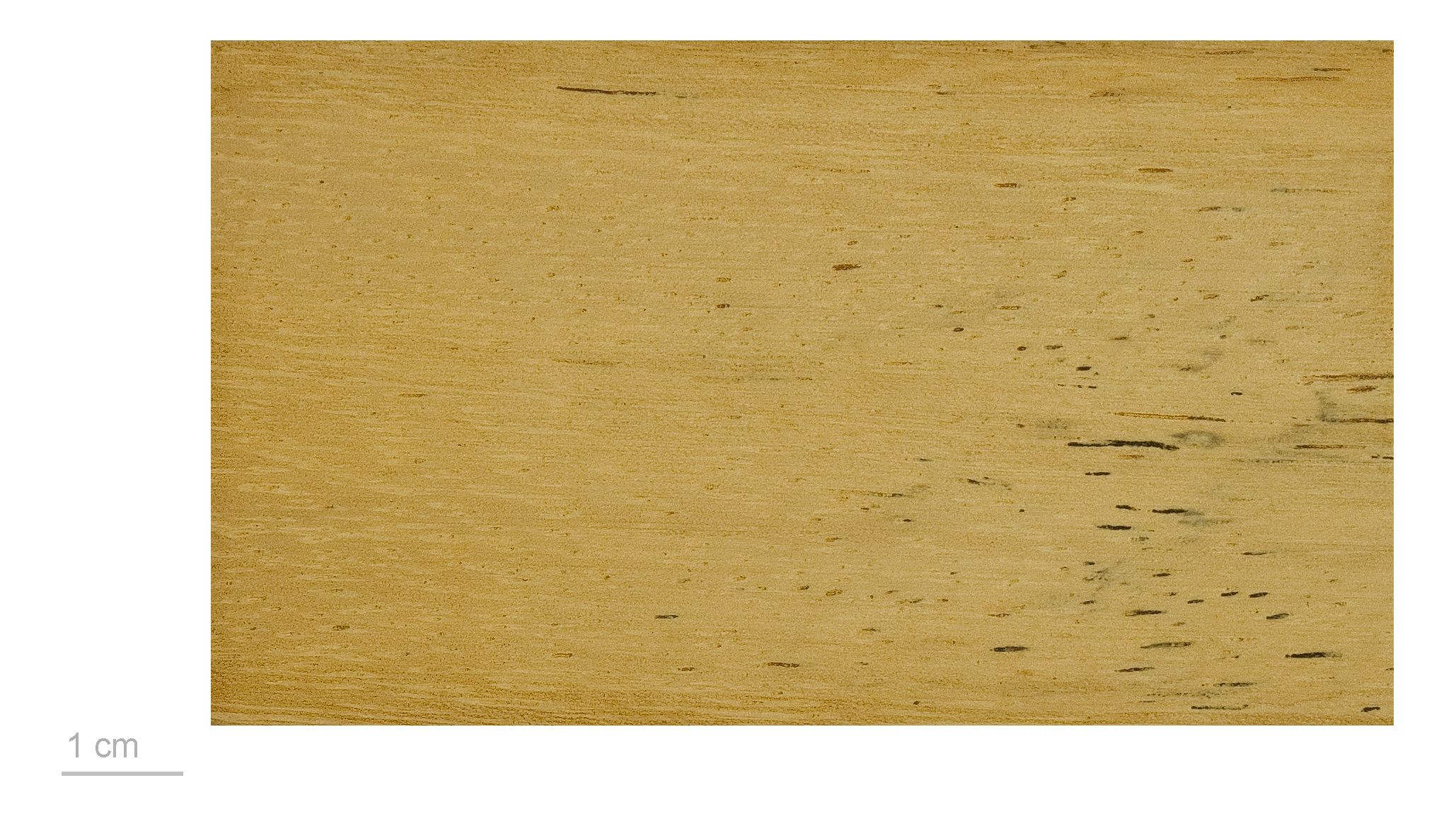
Parkia pendula wood, MHNT

Parkia is a genus of flowering plants in the family Fabaceae. It belongs to the mimosoid clade of the subfamily Caesalpinioideae. Several species are known as African locust bean.

In 1995, about 31 species were known. Four more species were outlined in 2009.

Parkia species are found throughout the tropics, with four species in Africa, about ten in Asia, and about 20 in the neotropics. The neotropical species were revised in 1986.

== Species ==
As of 2020, Plants of the World Online (POWO) recognised the following species:

- Parkia bahiae H.C.Hopkins
- Parkia balslevii H.C.Hopkins
- Parkia barnebyana H.C.Hopkins
- Parkia bicolor A.Chev. – African locust-bean
- Parkia biglandulosa Wight & Arn.
- Parkia biglobosa (Jacq.) R.Br. ex G.Don
- Parkia cachimboensis H.C.Hopkins
- Parkia decussata Ducke
- Parkia discolor Spruce ex Benth.
- Parkia filicina (Willd.) Benth. ex Walp.
- Parkia filicoidea Welw. ex Oliv.
- Parkia gigantocarpa Ducke
- Parkia igneiflora Ducke
- Parkia insignis Kurz
- Parkia intermedia Hassk.
- Parkia javanica (Lam.) Merr.
- Parkia korom Kaneh.
- Parkia leiophylla Kurz
- Parkia lutea H.C.Hopkins
- Parkia madagascariensis R.Vig.
- Parkia multijuga Benth.
- Parkia nana D.A.Neill
- Parkia nitida Miq.
- Parkia panurensis Benth. ex H.C.Hopkins
- Parkia paraensis Ducke
- Parkia parrii Horne ex Baker
- Parkia parvifoliola Hosok.
- Parkia paya H.C.Hopkins
- Parkia pendula (Willd.) Benth. ex Walp.
- Parkia platycephala Benth.
- Parkia reticulata Ducke
- Parkia sherfeseei Merr.
- Parkia singularis Miq.
- Parkia speciosa Hassk. – twisted cluster bean, stink bean
- Parkia sumatrana Miq.
- Parkia timoriana (DC.) Merr. – tree bean
- Parkia truncata R.S.Cowan
- Parkia ulei (Harms) Kuhlm.
- Parkia velutina Benoist
- Parkia versteeghii Merr. & L.M.Perry
