= Parkia parrii =

Conservation status
- Data Deficient (IUCN 3.1)

Scientific classification
- Kingdom: Plantae
- Clade: Tracheophytes
- Clade: Angiosperms
- Clade: Eudicots
- Clade: Rosids
- Order: Fabales
- Family: Fabaceae
- Subfamily: Caesalpinioideae
- Clade: Mimosoid clade
- Genus: Parkia
- Species: P. parrii

Binomial name
- Parkia parrii Horne ex Baker

Species of legume

Parkia parrii is a species of flowering plant in the family Fabaceae that is endemic to Fiji.
