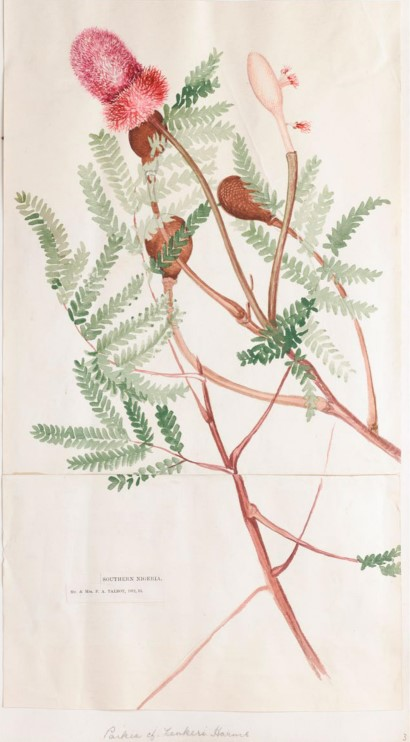

Conservation status
- Least Concern (IUCN 3.1)

Scientific classification
- Kingdom: Plantae
- Clade: Tracheophytes
- Clade: Angiosperms
- Clade: Eudicots
- Clade: Rosids
- Order: Fabales
- Family: Fabaceae
- Subfamily: Caesalpinioideae
- Clade: Mimosoid clade
- Genus: Parkia
- Species: P. bicolor

Binomial name
- Parkia bicolor A. Chev.

Synonyms
- Parkia agboensis A.Chev. Parkia klainei Pierre ex De Wild. Parkia zenkeri Harms

= Parkia bicolor =

Species of legume

Parkia bicolor, the African locust-bean, is a species of flowering plant, a tree in the family Fabaceae. It is native to tropical West and Central Africa. Its natural habitats are tropical moist lowland forests, swampland, woodland and savannah.

== Description ==
Parkia bicolor is a medium to large tree growing to a height of about 40 m (130 ft) with a trunk a metre or more in diameter with narrow, spreading buttresses. The crown is umbrella-shaped and has widely spreading branches. The young twigs are felted with short reddish-brown hairs. The leaves are alternate with ten to twenty-five pairs of pinnae, each composed of numerous pairs of small, narrow leaflets. The inflorescence is a pendulous, two-part head of small flowers, which is followed by long, dangling pods each containing up to twenty-five seeds.

== Distribution and habitat ==
Parkia bicolor is found in tropical western and central Africa, its range extending from Sierra Leone eastward to Yangambi in the Democratic Republic of the Congo, and southwards to Cabinda (Angola). It typically grows in rainforest and gallery forest, as well as woodland, swampy areas and savannah. When forest is being cleared, this species is often left as isolated trees because of its useful properties.

== Ecology ==
The flowers at the base of the flowerhead are sterile but produce plentiful nectar which attracts bats. The flowers are largely pollinated by the bats, but pottos and dormice have also been observed visiting them.

== Uses ==
The timber of Parkia bicolor is not highly esteemed but is used to make planks, and canoes and for light construction work, joinery and turnery. Additionally, it is used to make plywood and pulpwood. The flesh of the fruit can be eaten, and the seeds can be fermented to make a condiment. The bark, leaves and roots are all used in traditional medicine and the spreading crown makes this a useful shade tree.

Parkia bicolor exudes a water-soluble, proteinaceous gum. After hydrolysis, this yields 74% galactose, 9% arabinose, 9.5% glucuronic acid and 7.5% 4-0-methylglucuronic acid.

== Status ==
This is a common tree with a wide range, and is present in several protected areas. When the forest is clear felled, this tree is often preserved because of its edible and medicinal purposes. It faces no particular threats and the International Union for Conservation of Nature has listed it as being of "least concern".
