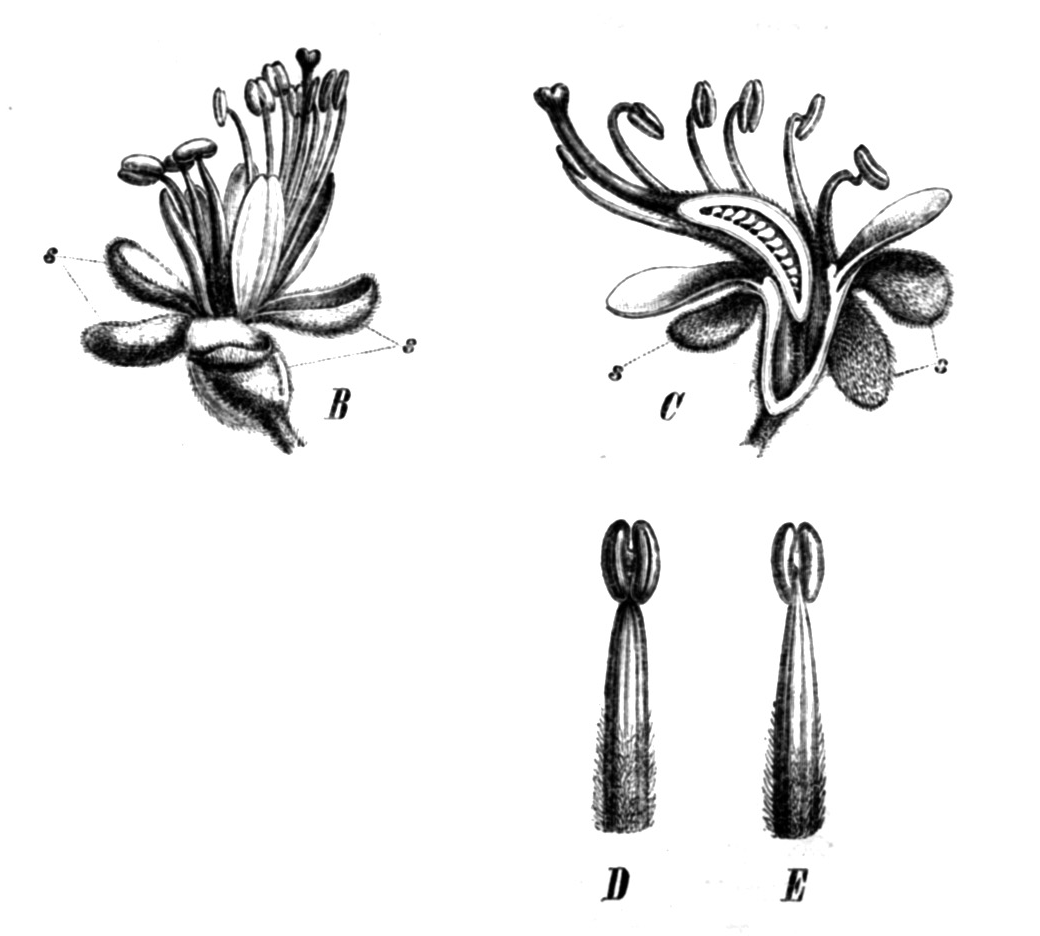
- Illustration of Peltogyne paniculata flowers

Scientific classification
- Kingdom: Plantae
- Clade: Tracheophytes
- Clade: Angiosperms
- Clade: Eudicots
- Clade: Rosids
- Order: Fabales
- Family: Fabaceae
- Subfamily: Detarioideae
- Tribe: Detarieae
- Genus: Peltogyne; Vogel

Species
- See text

Synonyms
- Orectospermum Schott

= Peltogyne =

Genus of flowering plants

Peltogyne, commonly known as purpleheart, violet wood, amaranth and other local names (often referencing the colour of the wood) is a genus of 23 species of flowering plants in the family Fabaceae; native to tropical rainforests of Central and South America; from Guerrero, Mexico, through Central America, and as far as south-eastern Brazil.

They are medium-sized to large trees growing to 30–50 m (100–160 ft) tall, with trunk diameters of up to 1.5 m (5 ft). The leaves are alternate, divided into a symmetrical pair of large leaflets 5–10 cm (2–4 in) long and 2–4 cm (1–2 in) broad. The flowers are small, with five white petals, produced in panicles. The fruit is a pod containing a single seed. The timber is desirable, but difficult to work.

== Distribution ==
The species of the genus range from southeastern Brazil through northern South America, Panama, Costa Rica, and Trinidad, with the majority of species in the Amazon Basin. P. mexicana is a geographic outlier, native to the Mexican state of Guerrero. Overharvesting has caused several species to become endangered in areas where they were once abundant.

== Wood ==
The trees are prized for their heartwood which, when cut, quickly turns from a light brown to a rich purple color. Exposure to ultraviolet (UV) light darkens the wood to a brown color with a slight hue of the original purple. This effect can be minimized with a finish containing a UV inhibitor.

The dry timber is very hard, stiff, and dense with a specific gravity of 0.86 (860 kg/m^{3} or 54 lb/cu ft). Purpleheart is correspondingly difficult to work with. It is very durable and water-resistant.

Due to its stiffness, the wood is used as a tonewood in instruments, especially guitar fretboards and reinforcing strips in the neck of guitars and basses. Some neck-through-body guitars are reinforced with purpleheart to aid structural and tuning stability as well as for its resonant tonal properties.

== Uses and hazards ==
Purpleheart is prized for use in fine inlay work especially on musical instruments, guitar fret boards (although rarely), woodturning, cabinetry, flooring, and furniture.

Purpleheart presents a number of challenges in the woodshop. Its hard-to-detect interlocking grain makes hand-planing, chiseling and working with carving tools a challenge. However, woodturners can note that with sharp tools, it turns clean, and sands well.

Exposure to the dust generated by cutting and sanding purpleheart can cause skin, eye, and respiratory irritation and nausea, possibly because of the presence of dalbergione (neoflavonoid) compounds in the wood. This also makes purpleheart wood unsuitable to most people for use in jewelry. Purpleheart is also a fairly expensive wood, which is why it is usually used in smaller-scale projects.

== Species ==
The following list of species is according to Plants of the World Online.

- Peltogyne altissima Ducke
- Peltogyne angustiflora Ducke
- Peltogyne campestris Ducke
- Peltogyne catingae Ducke
- Peltogyne chrysopis Barneby
- Peltogyne crenulata Afr.Fern.
- Peltogyne discolor Vogel
- Peltogyne excelsa Ducke
- Peltogyne floribunda (Kunth) Pittier
- Peltogyne gracilipes Ducke
- Peltogyne heterophylla M.F.Silva
- Peltogyne lecointei Ducke
- Peltogyne maranhensis Ducke
- Peltogyne mattosiana Rizzini
- Peltogyne mexicana Martinez
- Peltogyne paniculata Benth.
- Peltogyne paradoxa Ducke
- Peltogyne parvifolia Benth.
- Peltogyne pauciflora Benth.
- Peltogyne prancei M.F.Silva
- Peltogyne purpurea Pittier
- Peltogyne recifensis Ducke
- Peltogyne subsessilis W.A.Rodrigues
- Peltogyne venosa (M.Vahl) Benth.

== Gallery ==
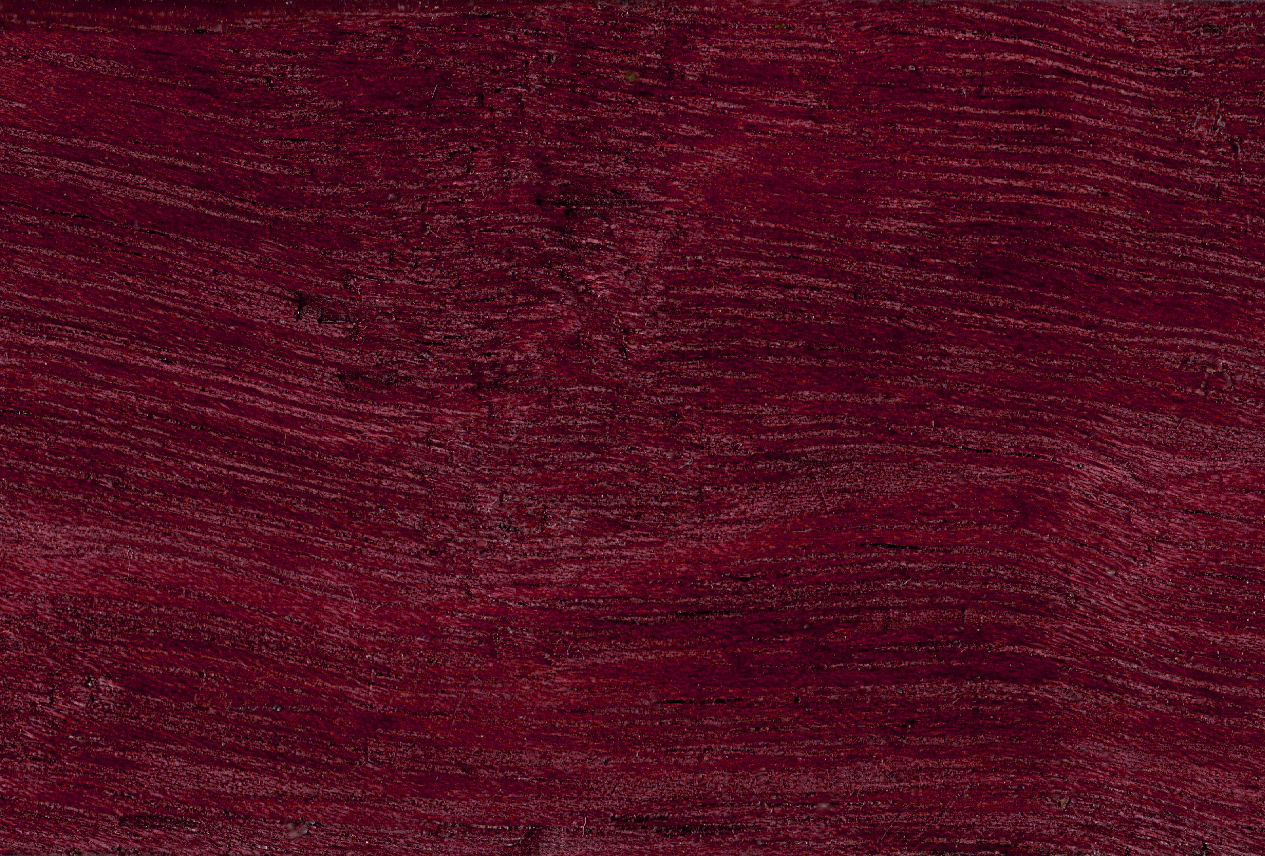

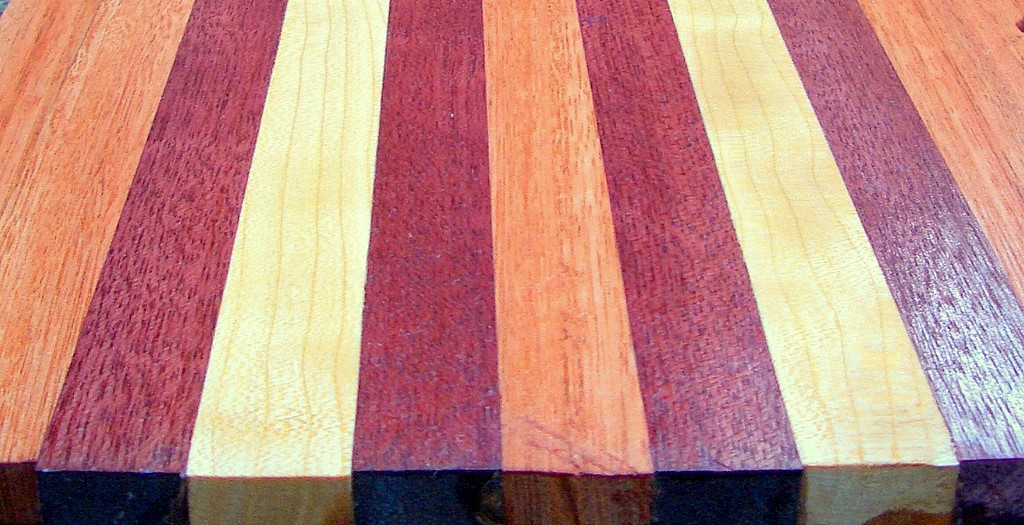
A board laminated with Purpleheart (the darkest of the three), as well as the lighter colored cherry and the salmon-colored Lyptus

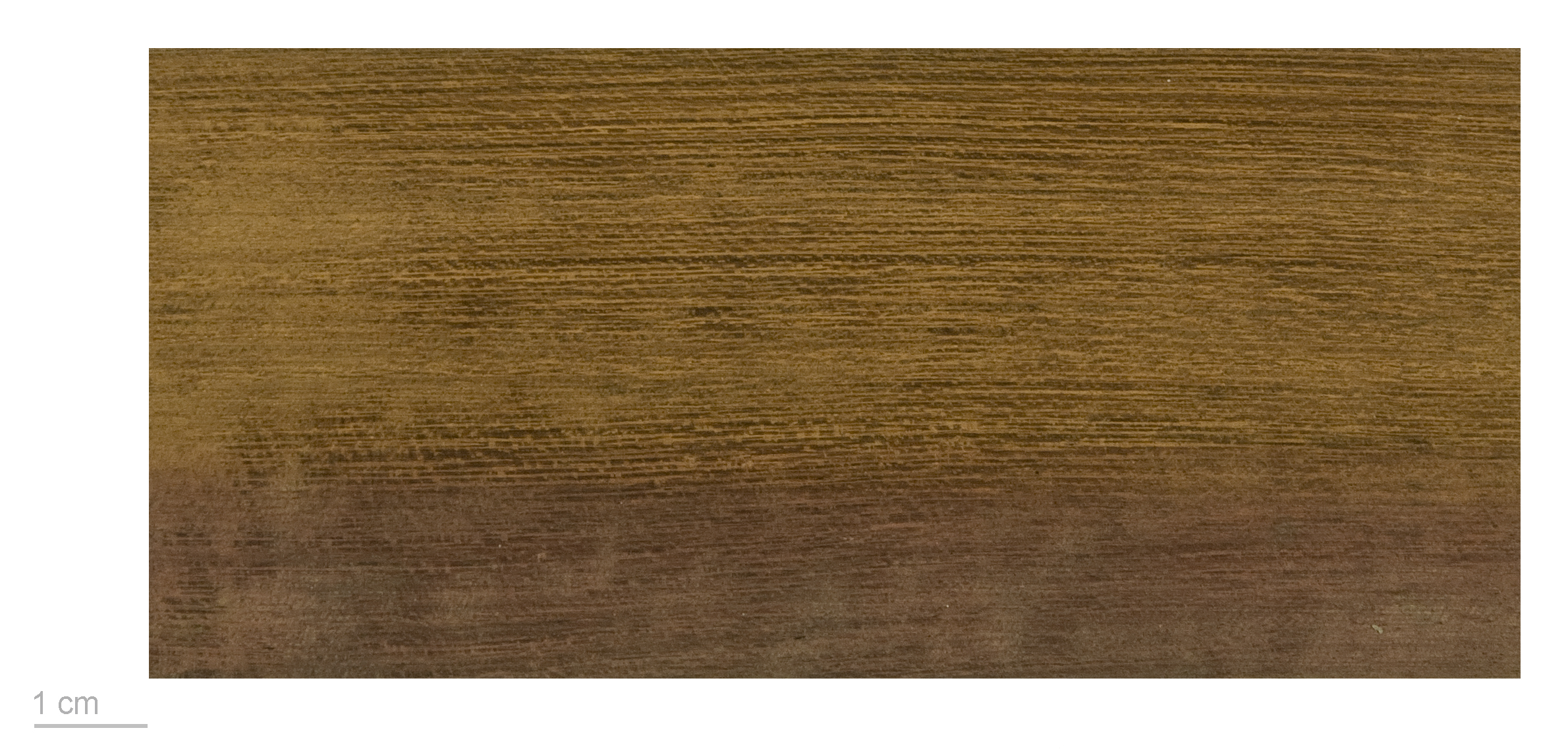
Peltogyne sp. - MHNT
