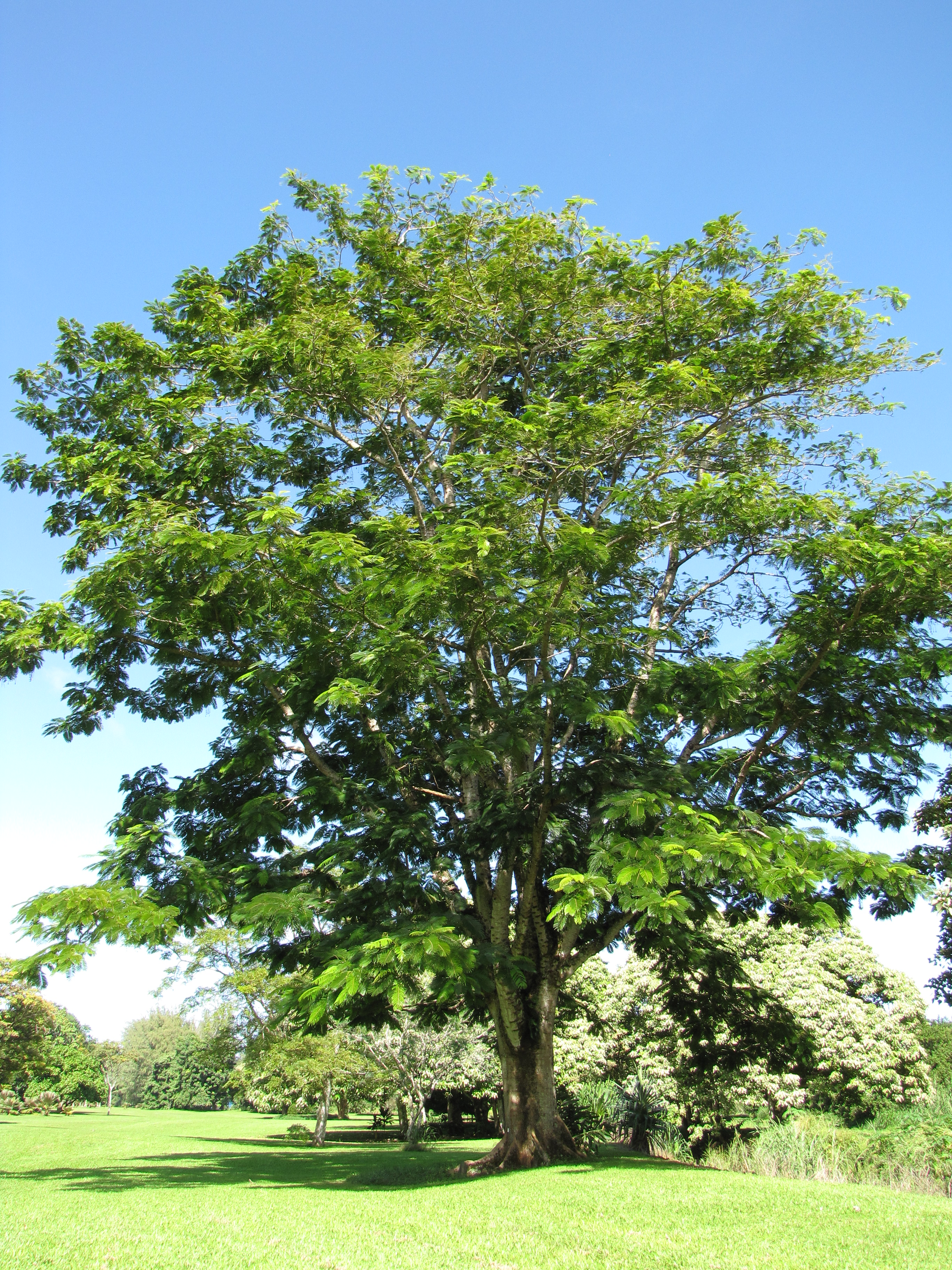

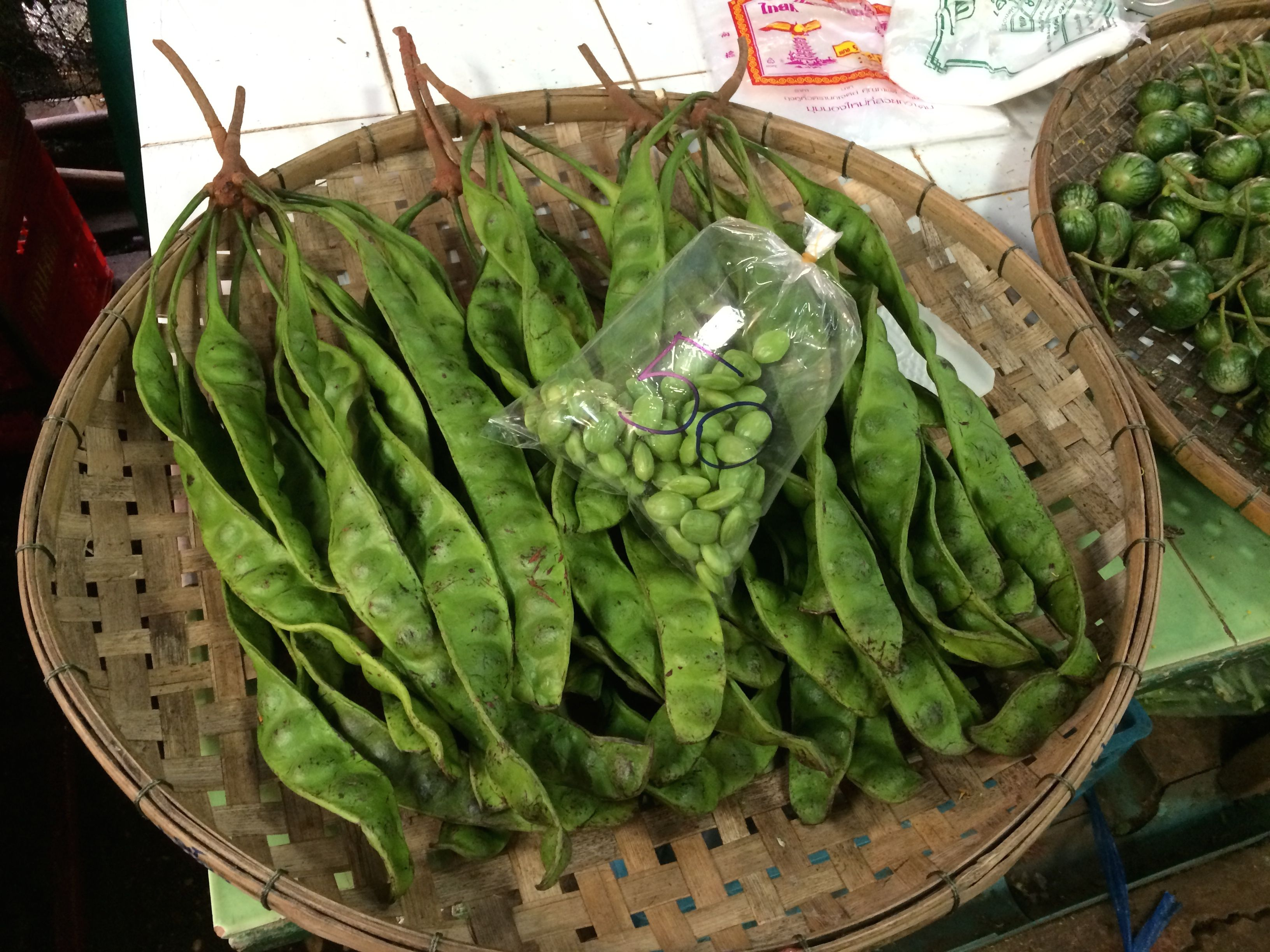

Conservation status
- Least Concern (IUCN 3.1)

Scientific classification
- Kingdom: Plantae
- Clade: Embryophytes
- Clade: Tracheophytes
- Clade: Spermatophytes
- Clade: Angiosperms
- Clade: Eudicots
- Clade: Rosids
- Order: Fabales
- Family: Fabaceae
- Subfamily: Caesalpinioideae
- Clade: Mimosoid clade
- Genus: Parkia
- Species: P. timoriana

Binomial name
- Parkia timoriana (DC.) Merr.

Synonyms
- Parkia javanica; Parkia roxburghii G. Don

= Parkia timoriana =

Species of flowering plant

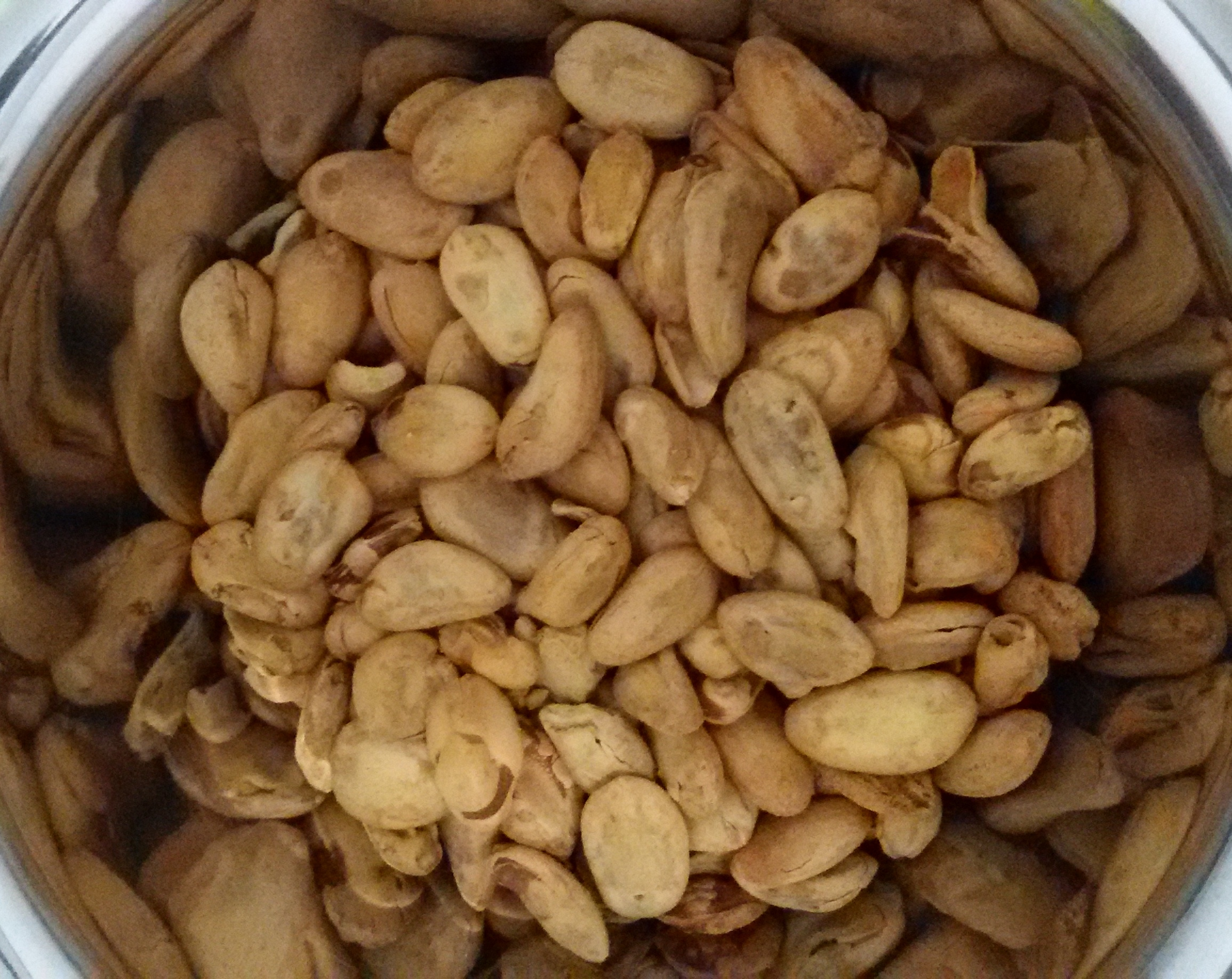
Roasted tree bean's seeds as snack in Indonesia

Parkia timoriana is a species of flowering plant in the Mimosa subfamily (Mimosoideae) of the legume family. English common names include tree bean. It is native to Thailand, Malaysia, Myanmar, Indonesia, and Assam and Manipur in India. It is widely cultivated for food and wood, and as an ornamental.

The tree is vulnerable to the pest insect Cadra cautella, a moth. The larva bores into the seed to pupate, feeding on the seed interior and filling it with webbing. It also consumes the flower heads.

== Description ==
This plant is a tree growing up to 30 meters tall. The leaf is bipinnate. It is divided into 20 to 30 or more leaflets called pinnae, which are up to 12 centimeters long. Each pinna is divided into 50 to 60 (even 70) pairs of smaller, narrow leaflets each up to a centimeter long. The inflorescence is a head of flowers dangling at the end of a peduncle up to 45 centimeters long. The flower head is a few centimeters wide and contains several flowers with five-lobed corollas. The fruit is a long, flattened legume pod up to 36 centimeters long which contains up to 21 hard, black seeds each around 2 centimeters long.

The flowers of this tree are pollinated by Old World fruit bats, especially Eonycteris spelaea, which feeds on the nectar. Bats are more efficient pollinators of the flowers than are the insects that also visit.

== Uses ==
There are a number of human uses for this tree. The wood is used for firewood and lumber. In Africa the wood is not generally used, but the tree is often planted for ornamental purposes. It is a popular garden tree in India, particularly in Assam and Manipur, where it is a "characteristic feature" of Meitei backyards. It is tolerant of sun and shade.

Tree bean is a common food in Thailand and Indonesia. In Thai cuisine this vegetable is known as nitta sprout, and it is added to curry. When the seeds are mature, they have a hard, black seed coat. The seeds can be dried and stored. The seeds have a strong "sulphur smell," which is due to the presence of thioproline. The treebean therefore requires an acquired taste. In some areas, the seeds of the related tree species Parkia speciosa (also known as yongchaak, petai or stink beans) are much more popular, and tree bean will be consumed as a second choice.
