= Parkia parvifoliola =

Conservation status
- Endangered (IUCN 3.1)

Scientific classification
- Kingdom: Plantae
- Clade: Tracheophytes
- Clade: Angiosperms
- Clade: Eudicots
- Clade: Rosids
- Order: Fabales
- Family: Fabaceae
- Subfamily: Caesalpinioideae
- Clade: Mimosoid clade
- Genus: Parkia
- Species: P. parvifoliola

Binomial name
- Parkia parvifoliola Hosokawa, 1938

Species of legume

Parkia parvifoliola is an endangered species of flowering tree in the family Fabaceae. It is endemic to the Palauan island of Babeldaob, in the central-western Pacific Ocean, and has a very restricted range, most of its population being found in an area of less than 4.1 km^{2} (1.6 sq mi) in the center of the island.

== Taxonomy ==
Parkia parvifoliola was first described by Takahide Hosokawa in 1938, in Transactions, Natural History Society of Formosa.

== Description ==
Parkia parvifoliola is a canopy tree with a mean height of 21 m (69 ft). Its fruit is a 24–30 cm (9.4–11.8 in) long strap shaped fibrous pod, which can lie dormant underground until soil conditions are favourable.

== Distribution and habitat ==
The species is endemic to the Palauan island of Babeldaob, in the central-western Pacific Ocean. It is found in stable, wet and inaccessible areas of primary forest and is rare, having an extent of occurrence of 10 km^{2} (3.9 sq mi) and an area of occupancy of 4–12 km^{2} (1.5–4.6 sq mi), but one population inhabiting three locations in central Babeldaob that span a total of less than 4.1 km^{2} (1.6 sq mi) accounts for almost the entire population of the species, which in 2022 was estimated to have 400 mature individuals.

The main threat to the species is human-induced habitat loss. Other threats include fires, both deliberate and accidental, and the invasive tree Falcataria moluccana, which can grow taller than native Palauan trees and thus take over their habitats. Due to the species' highly restricted range and the threats it faces, it was listed as endangered by its 2022 IUCN Red List assessment.
