= Peltogyne purpurea =

Conservation status
- Vulnerable (IUCN 3.1)

Scientific classification
- Kingdom: Plantae
- Clade: Embryophytes
- Clade: Tracheophytes
- Clade: Spermatophytes
- Clade: Angiosperms
- Clade: Eudicots
- Clade: Rosids
- Order: Fabales
- Family: Fabaceae
- Genus: Peltogyne
- Species: P. purpurea

Binomial name
- Peltogyne purpurea Pittier

Species of legume

Peltogyne purpurea, commonly known as purpleheart in English and nazareno, azulillo, or sangre de Cristo in Spanish, is a species of tree native to the Pacific coast of Costa Rica and Panama, and also the Atlantic coast of Colombia.

== Distribution ==
Peltogyne purpurea is native to the Pacific coast of Costa Rica and Panama, and also the Atlantic coast of Colombia. It is a common canopy tree in rainforests 50–500 meters above sea level at sites with more than 2500 mm (98.5 in) rainfall per year and temperatures from 23 to 27 °C or 73 to 80 °F. It occupies sites with well-drained and deep loamy soils in sloping terrains, as well as poor, reddish clay soils with high concentrations of iron and aluminum.

== Description ==
Peltogyne purpurea grows up to 50 meters tall and 1 meter in diameter. It has a rounded crown and typically short buttress roots that occasionally reach 3 meters tall. Purpleheart bark is smooth and light gray in old trees. Its distinct coloration makes it recognizable from great distances.

The leaves are alternate, pinnate and composed of a single pair of leaflets that are 5–7 cm long and 2–3 cm broad. Peltogyne purpurea reproduces between August and December, depending on geographic location. The flowers are white, aromatic, and small, and are arranged in subterminal panicles, or clusters. Purpleheart fruit matures between November and February. Fruits are brown with single seed pods. They are compressed, oval-shaped, and usually grow to 5 cm long.

In Costa Rica, Panama, and Colombia, Peltogyne purpurea has been declared a vulnerable species. Peltogyne purpurea was included in the "Red Book of Plants of Colombia: Endangered Timber Species", under the IUCN designation of Vulnerable (VU).

== Wood ==
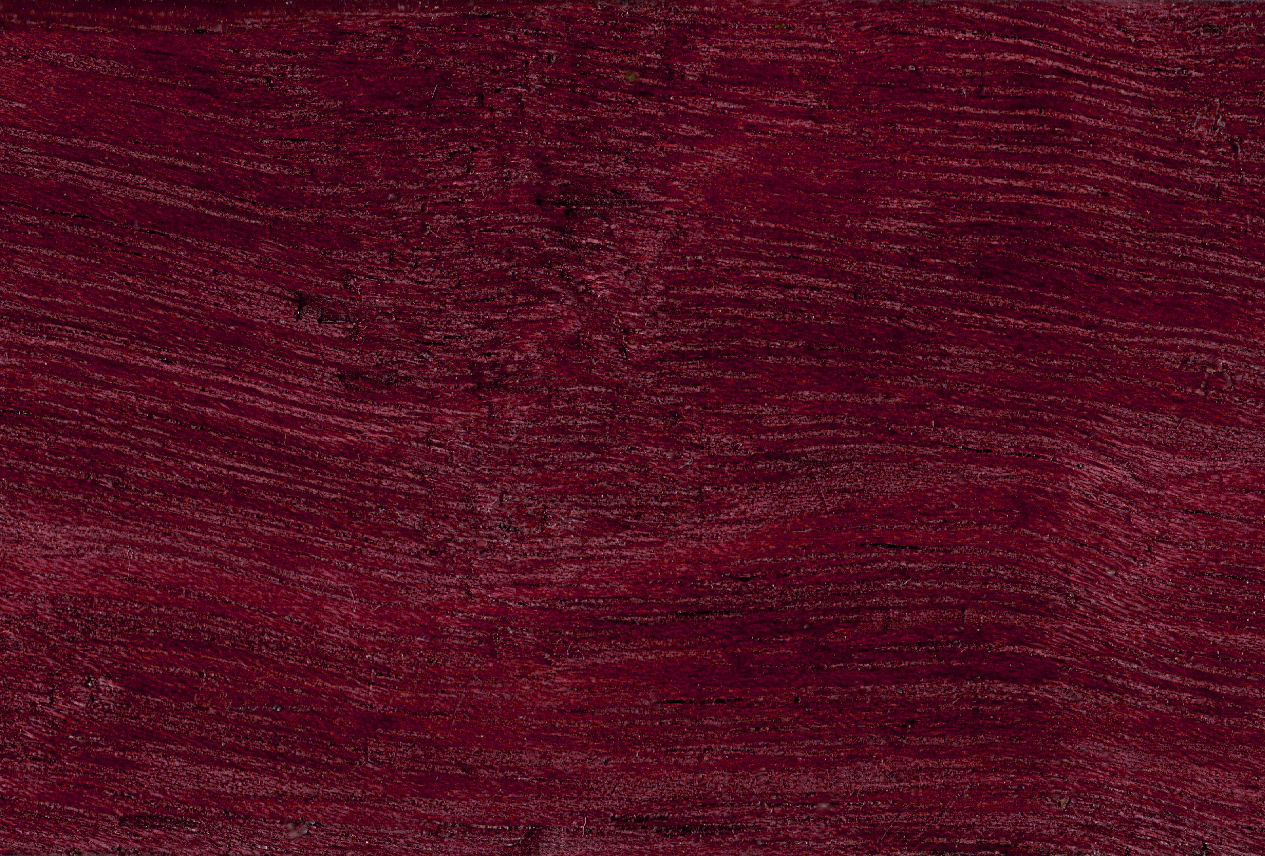
Purpleheart wood

Purpleheart wood is heavy (0.8-1 g/cm^{3}) with a medium to fine texture. The sapwood is gray-yellow, whereas the heartwood is bright purple with dark stripes. The wood is difficult to work with, dry, and preserve, but has a high natural durability. Purpleheart wood is popular for manufacturing floors, furniture, structural elements, and architectural finishes due to its physical and mechanical properties.

Purpleheart wood is moderately difficult to work with hand or machine tools. Slow feed rates and hardened cutters are suggested, because purpleheart exudes a gummy resin when heated by dull tools. The wood turns smoothly, is easy to glue and takes finishes well.

== Cultivation ==
There is little information about cultivation, because Peltogyne purpurea is not commercially cultivated. Its fruits can be collected directly from the tree, or from the soil once fruits have fallen. To remove the seeds, fruits must to be exposed to sunlight for 3–4 hours for one or two days. Seeds can be stored 2 to 3 years with regulated conditions of 5 °C and 6–8 % humidity. A kilogram of seeds has between 2200 and 2500 seeds.

In a plant nursery, seeds can be planted in disinfected sand seedbeds. Once plants reach 8–10 cm (normally 4 weeks after germination), plants are ready to be transplanted to the pots, bags or boxes. A plant will be ready to be planted in the field once it reaches 23 cm.

Peltogyne purpurea is a recognizable, coveted and highly exploited species; however, it is poorly studied and the only research that has been undertaken is in Costa Rica.

== Uses ==
In Costa Rica and Panama, purpleheart wood is an economically valuable tree, however its harvest is prohibited by law. The wood is commonly used for general carpentry, interior and exterior decoration, furniture, cabinet work, flooring, marquetry, stairways, wooden boat building & restoration, and luxury coffins.
