= Lagopsis =

Lagopsis may refer to:

- Lagopsis (mammal) - an extinct genus of animals in the family Ochotonidae
- Lagopsis (plant) - a genus of plants in the family Lamiaceae
