= Coleophora stachydis =

Scientific classification
- Kingdom: Animalia
- Phylum: Arthropoda
- Clade: Pancrustacea
- Class: Insecta
- Order: Lepidoptera
- Family: Coleophoridae
- Genus: Coleophora
- Species: C. stachydis

Binomial name
- Coleophora stachydis Baldizzone, 1994

Species of moth

Coleophora stachydis is a moth of the family Coleophoridae that is endemic to Afghanistan.

The larvae feed on Stachys parviflora. They feed on the leaves of their host plant.
