= Acrocercops isodelta =

Scientific classification
- Domain: Eukaryota
- Kingdom: Animalia
- Phylum: Arthropoda
- Class: Insecta
- Order: Lepidoptera
- Family: Gracillariidae
- Genus: Acrocercops
- Species: A. isodelta

Binomial name
- Acrocercops isodelta Meyrick, 1908

Species of moth

Acrocercops isodelta is a moth of the family Gracillariidae, known from Sri Lanka and India. It was described by Edward Meyrick in 1908. The hostplants for the species include Colebrookea oppositifolia and Elsholtzia fruticosa.
