= Brazoria =

Brazoria may refer to:

- Brazoria County, Texas
- Brazoria, Texas, a town in Brazoria County
- Brazoria (plant), a plant genus in the family Lamiaceae
