= Craniotome =

Craniotome may refer to:

- Craniotome (plant), a genus of plants in the mint family
- Craniotome, a tool used for a craniotomy to cut the skull
