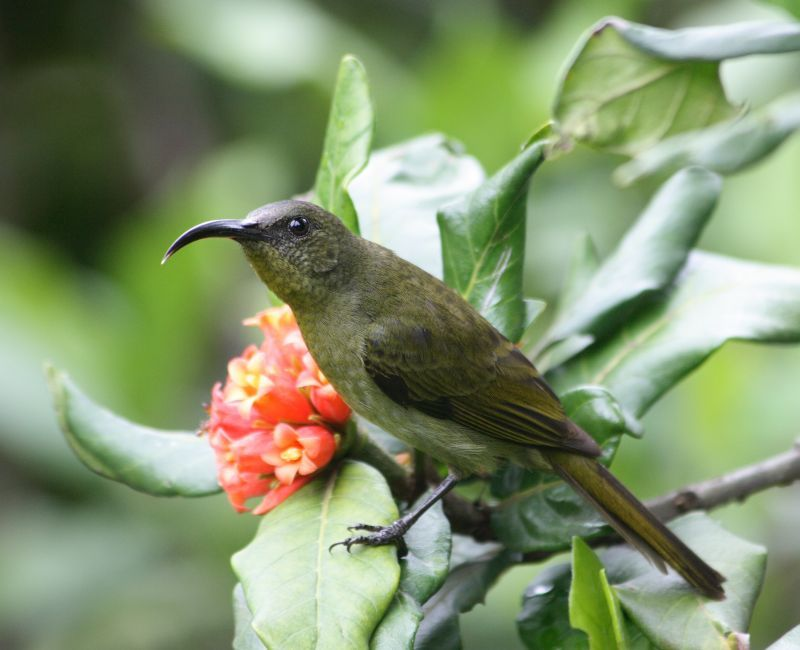

Conservation status
- Least Concern (IUCN 3.1)

Scientific classification
- Kingdom: Animalia
- Phylum: Chordata
- Class: Aves
- Order: Passeriformes
- Family: Nectariniidae
- Genus: Cyanomitra
- Species: C. olivacea

Binomial name
- Cyanomitra olivacea (Smith, 1840)

Synonyms
- Nectarinia olivacea

= Olive sunbird =

Species of bird

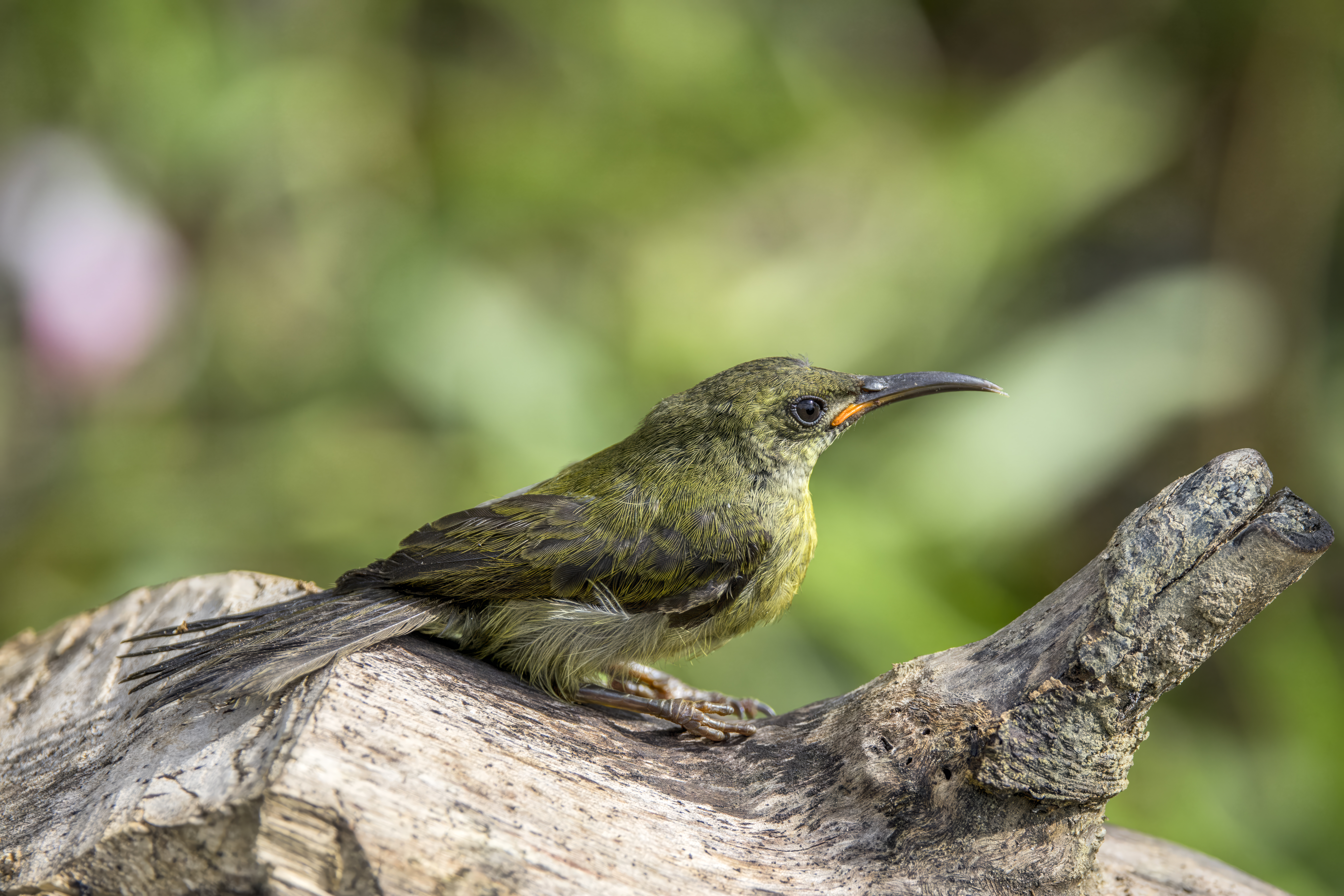
A juvenile oilve sunbird in Ankasa Forest Reserve, Ghana

The olive sunbird (Cyanomitra olivacea) is a large African species of sunbird belonging to the family Nectariniidae which encompasses species of sunbirds, spiderhunters, and flowerpeckers, and sugarbirds.

It has a large distribution that spans across central Africa from western countries including Senegal, Guinea, and Angola towards eastern countries including Ethiopia, Kenya, and Mozambique. This range also extends to southern African countries including South Africa and Zimbabwe. It is mainly nectarivorous and lives in a variety of forest, scrubland, and modified habitats.

== Description ==
The olive sunbird is a large sunbird that ranges from 6.2-15 g in mass, 50–73 mm in wing length, 20–29 mm in bill length, 35–66 mm in tail length, and 12–15 cm in overall body size depending on the subspecies and sex.

Its body colouration can vary from fully dark-olive to dull-olive with a paler olive-yellow or olive-grey underside. It has a long beak that curves downward and varies in colour from solid black to mottled grey, beige, and yellow-orange depending on the subspecies. Yellowish-orange pectoral tufts can be present in the males and females found in eastern subspecies while only males bear these tufts in western subspecies.

Olive sunbirds show morphological differences between forest-savanna boundaries despite minimal genetic variation. Adult males from forest-savanna boundary habitats had longer wings, legs, and bills than adult males found in forest habitats.

== Taxonomy and systematics ==
It belongs to the order Passeriformes in the family Nectariniidae and the Genus of Cyanomitra. Historically, the olive sunbird was separated into two species: the eastern olive sunbird (Cyanomitra olivacea) and the western olive sunbird (Cyanomitra obscura). C. olivacea included races changamwensis, neglecta, alfredi, olivacina while C. obscura included races guineensis, cephaelis, ragazzii, granti, sclateri. These two groups were and still are customarily treated as two separate species based on the distinction that eastern females bear large, yellow pectoral tufts while western females lack them. Differences in vocalizations between the two groups also contribute to this notion. However, mitochondrial DNA (mtDNA) analysis and minimal plumage differentiation provide evidence that both groups belong to the same species (conspecific). Consequently, C. olivacea is officially regarded as one species that comprises 11 recognized subspecies.

=== Subspecies ===
The subspecies of C. olivacea are as follows.

==== Cyanomitra olivacea olivacea ====
The range of C.o. oviacea extends south from the southern KwaZulu-Natal towards the northern eastern Eastern Cape of South Africa.

Adult males and adult females look alike. They possess dark brown remiges that are outlined by yellow-green on the outer two primaries and dark brown rectrices with yellow-green margins except for the outermost feathers. They possess a yellowish-green breast and belly which transition into darker shades on the lower belly, undertail coverts, and sides of the body below the wings. They bear whitish-grey underwing coverts and "armpit" feathers with yellowish-green tips while most of their upper body exhibits a rich greenish-olive colour including their rump, neck, mantle, back, and uppertail coverts. They have brownish-black foreheads that extend to the back of the neck and sides of the face. The crown and forehead exhibit a faint metallic blue hue. The chin and throat are olive-green and are highlighted by orangish-yellow tints, in addition to the upper breast. They possess dark brown irises, black legs and bill, and bright yellow pectoral tufts that are occasionally blended with orange.

==== Cyanomitra olivacea guineensis ====
C. o. guineensis is distributed across eastern Senegal towards Ghana and Togo.

The male has similar colouring to C. o. olivacea but has a faint stripe above the eye with a buff patch in front of it. It also exhibits faint white speckling at the ears and cheeks and contains more greyish-olive colouring in its underparts. The majority of the beak is black but the lower segment is paler at the base than the beak of C. o. olivacea. The male also possesses white underwing coverts, yellowish-white feathers at the base of the wing, and brown legs with greenish-black feet. The female looks similar to the male but lacks pectoral tufts, possesses olive legs with yellow behind feet, and has an orangish-brown tinge to the base of the lower segment of the bill. The female also has a shorter tail than the male.

==== Cyanomitra olivacea cephaelis ====
C. o. cephaelis is distributed from eastern Benin to Central African Republic and its range extends southward towards northern Angola. It’s also found in the Gulf of Guinea around Príncipe.

The base of the lower segment of the bill has a more yellowish-beige tone than C. o. olivacea. Also exhibits a paler underside than C. o. olivacea. It’s similar overall to C. o. ragazzii but possesses a shorter bill and paler underparts with hints of yellowish-green.

==== Cyanomitra olivacea obscura ====
C. o. obscura's distribution is restricted to Bioko.

It differs from C. o. olivacea as it exhibits a pale underside but still contains yellow-green hues. Overall similar to C. o. cephaelis but its underparts have paler whitish-grey tones and its overall body and bill size is larger. This subspecies also differs from C. o. olivacea and C. o. cephaelis as its upperside and wing edges are a brighter shade of green.

==== Cyanomitra olivacea ragazzii ====
C. o. ragazzii ranges from eastern Democratic Republic of Congo to southern South Sudan and expands eastward towards Central Ethiopia, Uganda, western Kenya, western Tanzania and Zambia

It possesses a yellow-coloured base to the lower beak. It also appears to be a darker and richer shade of green than both C. o. olivacea and C. o. obscura and possesses a paler underside.

==== Cyanomitra olivacea changamwensis ====
C. o. changamwensis extends from southern Somalia and coastal southeastern Kenya towards various Tanzanian regions including Taita, Usambaras, Pugu Hills, south Pare Mountains, Zanzibar, and Mafia Island.

C. o. changamwensis can be distinguished from C. o. olivacea by its contrasted underside. Its abdomen is pale greyish-white while its breast and throat are green. It also has a smaller beak and overall body size than C. o. olivacea.

==== Cyanomitra olivacea neglecta ====
C. o. neglecta{'}s range extends from south-central Kenya to northeastern Tanzania.

It differs from C. o. olivacea as it exhibits a duller green colour on its upperside. It can be differentiated from C. o. alfredi by its darker crown and greyer underside.

==== Cyanomitra olivacea granti ====
C. o. granti is found off the coast of northeastern Tanzania on Pemba Island.

Like C. o. obscura, C. o. granti is visually distinct from C. o. olivacea with its pale underside and faint colour traces of yellow and green While C. o. granti and C.o. obscura are visually similar, they can be distinguished from one another by their bill shapes and sizes. C. o. granti has a shorter and straighter beak than C. o. obscura.

==== Cyanomitra olivacea alfredi ====
C. o. alfredi extends from southern Tanzania towards eastern Zambia, Malawi, and northern Mozambique.

C. o. alfredi can be distinguished from C. o. olivacea by its greener colour and smaller size. However, the distinction is quite minimal. It can also be identified by its lighter and paler grey crown, lighter underside, and thinner bill.

==== Cyanomitra olivacea sclateri ====
C. o. sclateri is found near the Chimanimani region of eastern Zimbabwe and extends towards the Mozambique border.

Like C. o. obscura, C. o. sclateri differs from C. o. olivacea through its pale underside that’s highlighted by yellowish-green tones. However, it is different from C. o. obscura in that it has a paler underside and the breast feathers have darkish hues on their edges. C. o. sclateri can also be identified by the presence of light brown-olive colouration on the tips of the rectrices.

==== Cyanomitra olivacea olivacina ====
C. o. olivacina is found along the coastal regions of southeastern Tanzania, Mozambique and northeastern South Africa, extending to the KwaZulu-Natal province.

C. o. olivacina has a paler colouration on both its upperparts and underparts than the other subspecies. It can be distinguished from C.o. alfredi by its smaller body, shorter wing-span, and reduced bill. It can also be identified by the absence of orange hues in the pectoral tufts.

== Habitat and movement ==
Olive sunbirds occur in a variety of habitats including coastal and montane scrublands, woodlands, bushy and coastal thickets, and western mangroves. They are found throughout primary and secondary forests at all heights but especially prefer the understories. They also occupy modified habitats such as agricultural lands, forest clearings, gardens, urban areas, bushes around villages, and active or abandoned eucalyptus, banana, and coffee plantations. Their altitudinal distribution ranges from sea level to 3000 m above sea level but they tend to stay within 2300 m. Despite being primarily sedentary, they have been shown to partially migrate to lower elevations during cold seasons and higher elevations during warm seasons. Potential explanations for this behaviour include compensating for seasonal temperature change, females seeking out cooler environments to satisfy optimal breeding conditions, or high movement capability. Moreover, olive sunbirds are highly motile and can traverse across forest gaps as well as navigate between fragmented forest patches and eucalyptus plantations.

== Behaviour ==
=== Diet ===
Olive sunbirds feed on nectar, insects, spiders, fruits, berries, seeds, pollen, and banana pulp. They extract nectar by hovering in front of flowers and catch arthropods through gleaning, hawking, poking, and hovering in front of vegetation. They often pursue flowers that contain high volumes of nectar. Dominant males are highly territorial and secure productive flowering sites with sufficient nectar yield. They have been shown to deter other sunbirds and even bees that are competing within their territory. However, honeybees (Apis mellifera) that are competing for Tecoma stans also chase away sunbirds by swarming their faces. Olive sunbirds mainly forage in the understory of the forest but can extend their range towards both canopy and floor.

==== Plant species in diet ====
Known plant species from which the different subspecies forage include:

- Achyrospermum carvalhi
- Aframomum sp.
- Agelanthus kraussianus
- Antidesema venosum
- Burchellia sp.
- Carica papaya
- Ceiba pentandra
- Cephaelis mannii
- Dracaena flagrans
- Englerina woodfordiodes
- Erythrina sp.
- Eugenia malacensis
- Fuchsia sp.
- Gardenia tigrina
- Grevillea banksii
- Halleria lucida
- Hibiscus tiliaceus
- Ipomoea sp.
- Jacaranda sp.
- Kigelia africanca
- Leonotis leonurus
- Leonotis mollissima
- unidentified Loranthaceae
- Macrorungia pubinervia
- Macaranga assas
- Macaranga barteri
- Musa sp.
- Musanga cecropioides
- Mimusops caffra
- Oxyanthus troupini
- Passiflora sp.
- Schotia brachypetala
- Strelitzia nicolai
- Symphonia globulifera
- Syzygium congolense
- Tecoma sp.
- Tetrorchidium didymostemon
- Trema guineensis
- Xylopia aethiopica

=== Reproduction ===
==== Courtship ====
Resident males practice polygyny and only welcome females into their territory after copulation and performing displays. 10-20 actively singing males form leks and compete for the highest perching positions in the area. Lekking displays include singing, jumping, fluffing breast feathers, revealing pectoral tufts, and fluttering mid-flight. Males also extend their heads while dangling their wings and holding their tail at a 45-degree angle.

==== Nest construction ====
The exact features, materials, location, and size dimensions of their nests vary across eastern and western subspecies. The nests are often designed into a messy, elongated pear-shape lined with seed down, feathers, fine grass, and other soft fibres. They are constructed by the female within two days using dry grasses, twigs, lichens, mosses, leaves, rootlets, and stems which are held together by cobwebs. The nests are built on or suspended from forest branches, shrubs, branches overhanging water bodies, unearthed roots in eroded banks, electrical cables, and various house features (e.g. nails, eaves, roof wires, and ceiling mobiles). Nests can range from 0.3-0.6 meters above the ground, 90-220mm in height, 75–90 mm wide, and 70-90mm deep with a 30–40 mm diameter entrance hole. 260–700 mm long beards trail from the extensive, messy base of the nest’s side-opening known as the porch.

==== Nesting seasons ====
Nesting/egg-laying times differ depending on subspecies and location:

- Kenya: June
- Malawi: September–February
- Mozambique: November
- South Africa: August–April
- Tanzania: December–January (Zanzibar: September–April)
- Angola: October–March; August–September in Cabinda
- Cameroon: February–August
- DRC: February, June–October
- Côte d’Ivoire: March
- Bioko: January
- Gabon: Primarily in the dry seasons June–September but can occur year-round
- Ghana: August–May
- Nigeria: January, November
- Príncipe: November–January
- Sudan: June–August
- Uganda: February, April–June, August–September
- Zimbabwe: September–March; peak between November–December

==== Egg characteristics ====
One to three eggs are present in a clutch and can exhibit different colours such as grey, grey-white, or brown-grey with either greyish-brown streaks or olive-grey, grey-green, violet-grey, yellowish-brown, or dark brown mottling. Egg size ranges from 12-19.4 mm depending on the subspecies.

==== Nesting timeline ====
Eggs are generally laid in 24-hour intervals. Incubation occurs for 12–15 days by the female but both parents feed the nestlings. The fledgling period spans 13–17 days but the nestlings can remain dependent on the female for some time after this period.

==== Brood parasites ====
The African emerald cuckoo (Chrysococcyx cupreus) and Klaas’s cuckoo (Chrysococcyx klaas) are known to parasitize olive sunbird nests; in Gabon, brood parasitism by honeyguides (Indicator sp.) has also been reported.

=== Nest predation ===
In several reported cases, individuals were observed carrying eggs in their bills. One observation documented an individual actively depredating on a nest of an African paradise flycatcher (see external link).

=== Vocalizations ===
The olive sunbird produces an incredibly loud song that accelerates throughout the song’s duration and is composed of ascending and descending notes.

Cyanomitra olivacea olivacea produces a song approximately one minute long that consists of repeating ascending and descending whistles. There can be infrequent sections of melodic sounds resembling “tsee-tsee-tsee-, tseedlee, eedlee-id-id-id-seedle, eedle-ee-ee-ee” and slower sections that trill like “see-weetee-wee-tee-to-tip."

There are variations of the song for the different subspecies. C. o. alfredi's song is composed of descending notes that resemble a “dee-dee-dee-di-do” sound. There are also several repeated “tschi” notes every half a second for the song of this subspecies. The song of C. o. obscura differs by the presence of repetitive “hoo-hoo-hoo” noises. C. o. guineensis' vocalizations consist of “chip” noises every half a second or patterns of high and low notes every second. C. o. cephaelis makes altering falsetto-like vocalizations that increase and decrease. Calls consist of a variety of repetitive short staccato notes that resemble a “chip” sound.

== Parasites ==
It has been documented that the olive sunbird can be infected by different varieties of avian parasites. Species of Trypanosoma, a genus of protists that can infect avian species, have been reported of infecting olive sunbirds. Olive sunbirds have also been documented with blood parasites including Haemoproteus and Plasmodium species.

== Conservation ==
The Olive Sunbird, including all of the subspecies, is listed as being of least concern by the International Union for the Conservation of Nature on the IUCN Red List. This status is attributed to the olive wunbird’s large range, stable population size, and lack of threats. The population size has not been officially measured but retains its stable status due to the widespread and common reports of this species.
