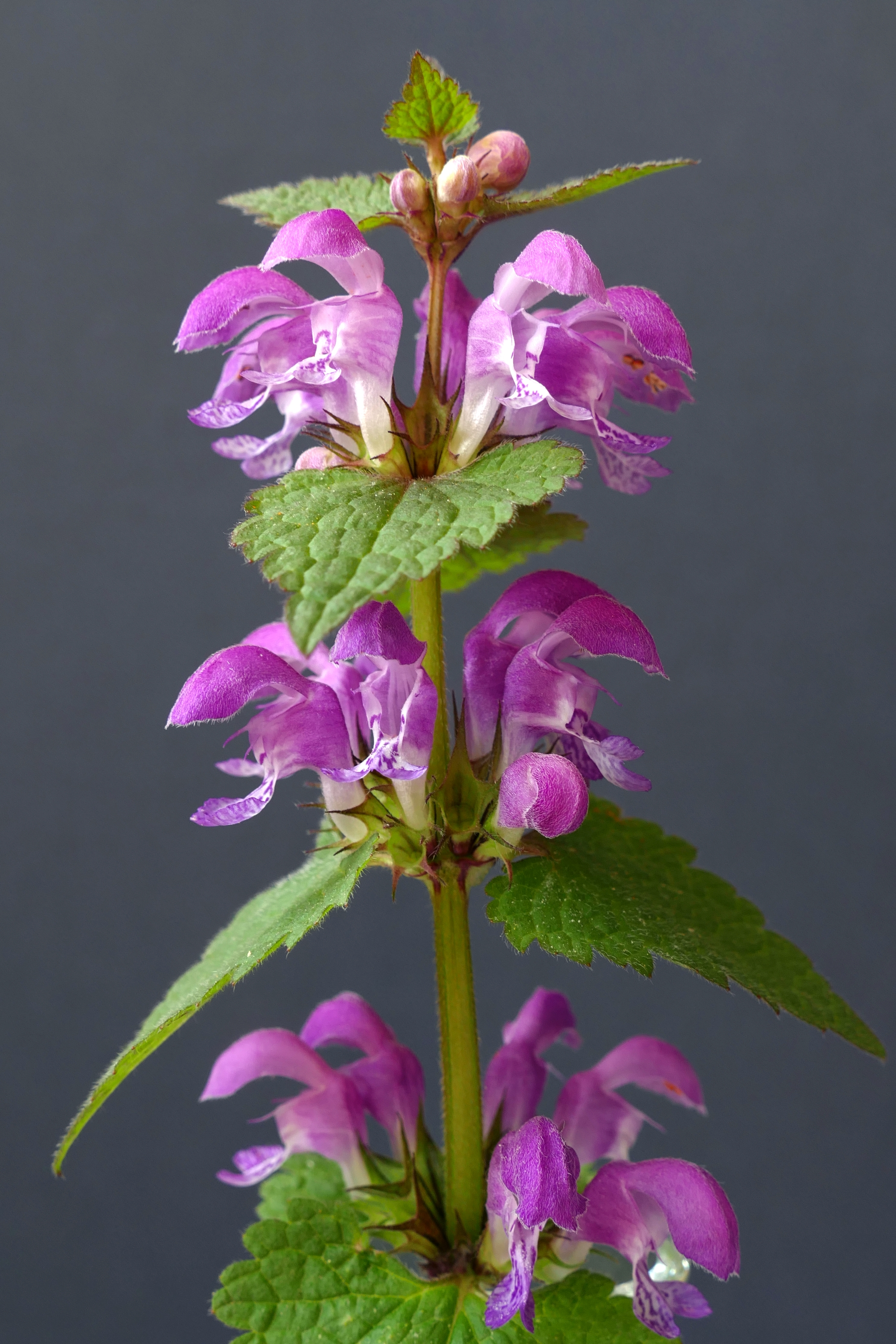
- Lamium maculatum

Scientific classification
- Kingdom: Plantae
- Clade: Embryophytes
- Clade: Tracheophytes
- Clade: Spermatophytes
- Clade: Angiosperms
- Clade: Eudicots
- Clade: Asterids
- Order: Lamiales
- Family: Lamiaceae
- Subfamily: Lamioideae; Harley

= Lamioideae =

Subfamily of flowering plants in the sage family

Lamioideae is a subfamily of plants in the family Lamiaceae.

Genera include:

- Acanthoprasium
- Achyrospermum
- Acrotome
- Ajugoides
- Anisomeles
- Ballota
- Betonica
- Brazoria
- Chaiturus
- Chamaesphacos
- Chelonopsis
- Colebrookea
- Colquhounia
- Comanthosphace
- Craniotome
- Eremostachys
- Eriophyton
- Eurysolen
- Galeopsis
- Gomphostemma
- Haplostachys
- Holocheila
- Hypogomphia
- Isoleucas
- Lagochilus
- Lagopsis
- Lamiophlomis
- Lamium
- Leonotis
- Leonurus
- Leucas
- Leucosceptrum
- Loxocalyx
- Macbridea
- Marrubium
- Matsumurella
- Melittis
- Metastachydium
- Microtoena
- Moluccella
- Notochaete
- Otostegia
- Panzerina
- Paralamium
- Paraphlomis
- Phlomidoschema
- Phlomis
- Phlomoides
- Phyllostegia
- Physostegia
- Pogostemon
- Prasium
- Pseuderemostachys
- Pseudodictamnus
- Pseudomarrubium
- Rostrinucula
- Roylea
- Rydingia
- Sideritis
- Stachyopsis
- Stachys
- Stenogyne
- Suzukia
- Synandra
- Thuspeinanta
- Warnockia
