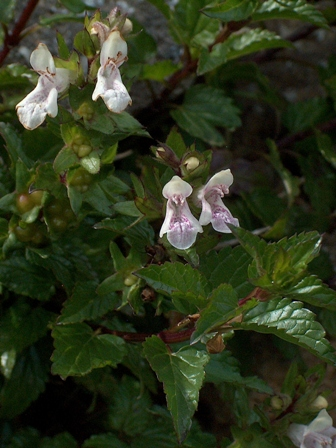

Scientific classification
- Kingdom: Plantae
- Clade: Embryophytes
- Clade: Tracheophytes
- Clade: Spermatophytes
- Clade: Angiosperms
- Clade: Eudicots
- Clade: Asterids
- Order: Lamiales
- Family: Lamiaceae
- Subfamily: Lamioideae
- Genus: Prasium; L.
- Species: P. majus

Binomial name
- Prasium majus L.

Synonyms
- Prasium minus L.; Prasium laetum Salisb.; Prasium medium Lowe; Levina Adans.

= Prasium =

White hedge-nettle

Genus of flowering plants

Prasium, common name white hedge-nettle, is a genus of flowering plant in the family Lamiaceae, first described in 1982. It contains only one known species, Prasium majus, first described for modern science in 1753. It is native to Madeira, the Canary Islands, and the Mediterranean region of Europe, North Africa, and the Middle East, as far east as Turkey, Cyprus, and Israel.
