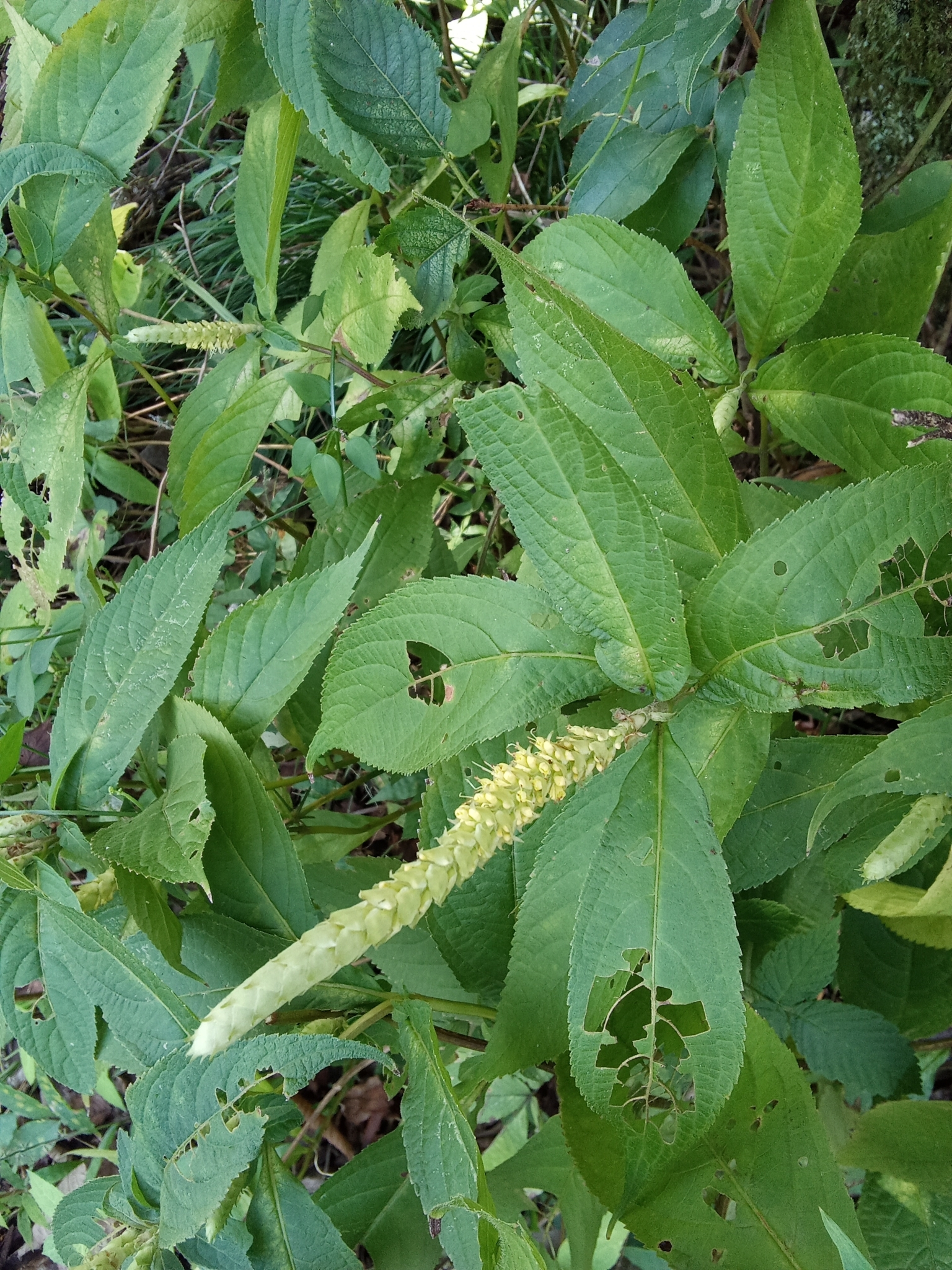
- Comanthosphace japonica

Scientific classification
- Kingdom: Plantae
- Clade: Tracheophytes
- Clade: Angiosperms
- Clade: Eudicots
- Clade: Asterids
- Order: Lamiales
- Family: Lamiaceae
- Subfamily: Lamioideae
- Genus: Comanthosphace; S.Moore

= Comanthosphace =

Genus of flowering plants

Comanthosphace is a genus of plants in the family Lamiaceae, first described in 1877. It is native to East Asia (China, Taiwan, Japan).

- Comanthosphace formosana Ohwi — Taiwan
- Comanthosphace japonica (Miq.) S.Moore — Japan, China (Anhui, Guangdong, Jiangsu, Jiangxi)
- Comanthosphace nanchuanensis C.Y.Wu & H.W.Li — China (Sichuan)
- Comanthosphace ningpoensis (Hemsl.) Hand.-Mazz. — China (Anhui, Guizhou, Hubei, Hunan, Jiangxi, Zhejiang)
- Comanthosphace stellipila (Miq.) S.Moore ex Briq. — Japan (Honshu, Shikoku)
