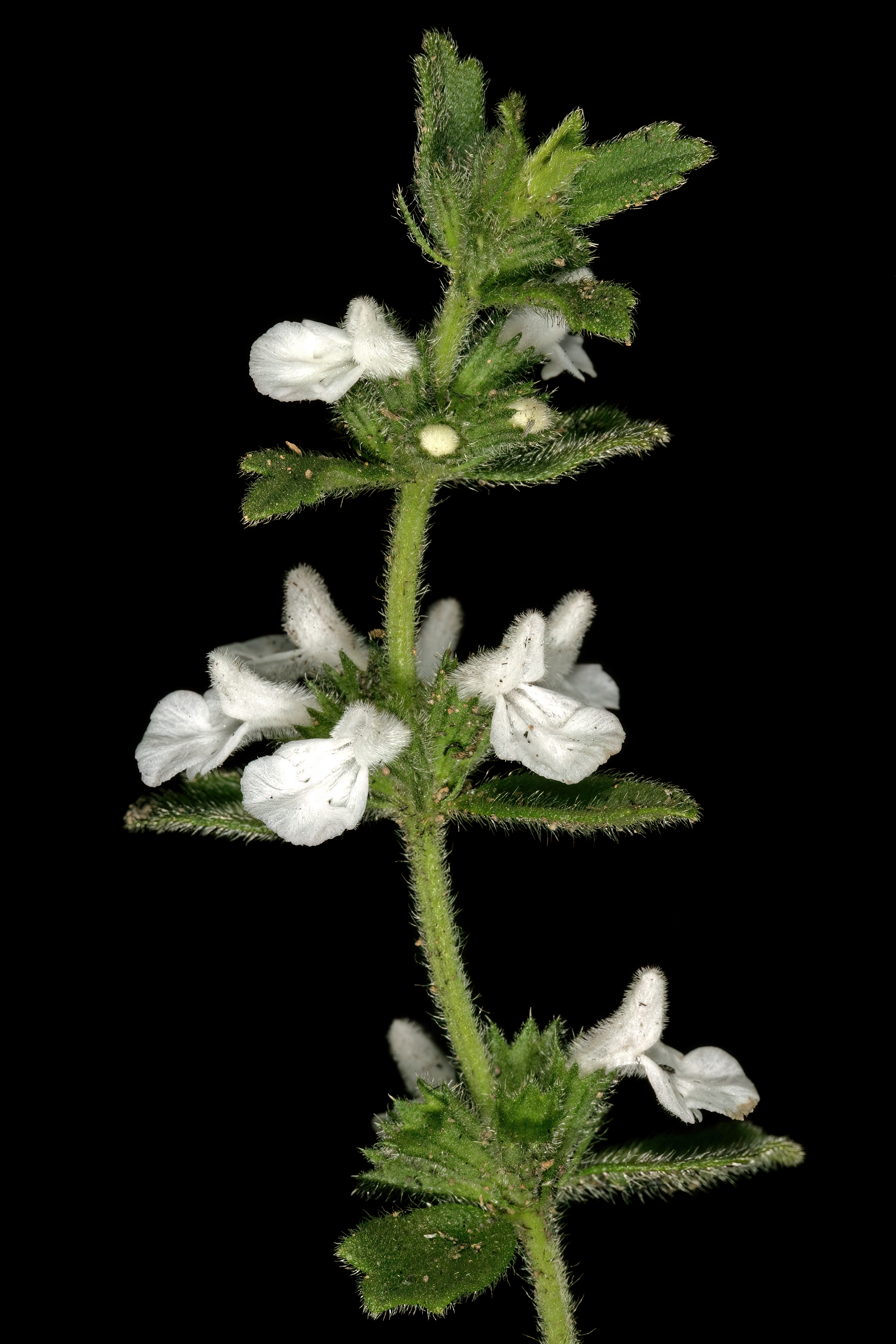

Scientific classification
- Kingdom: Plantae
- Clade: Tracheophytes
- Clade: Angiosperms
- Clade: Eudicots
- Clade: Asterids
- Order: Lamiales
- Family: Lamiaceae
- Genus: Acrotome
- Species: A. hispida

Binomial name
- Acrotome hispida Benth.

= Acrotome hispida =

Species of plant

Acrotome hispida (white cat's paws) is a species of flowering plant in the family Lamiaceae. This species is native to the Free State, Kwazulu-Natal, and Northern Provinces of South Africa and Eswatini. Acrotome hispida was first published in 1848.

== Habitat ==
Acrotome hispida mostly grows in dry tropical biomes, usually depending on the season.

== See also ==
- List of Lamiaceae of South Africa
