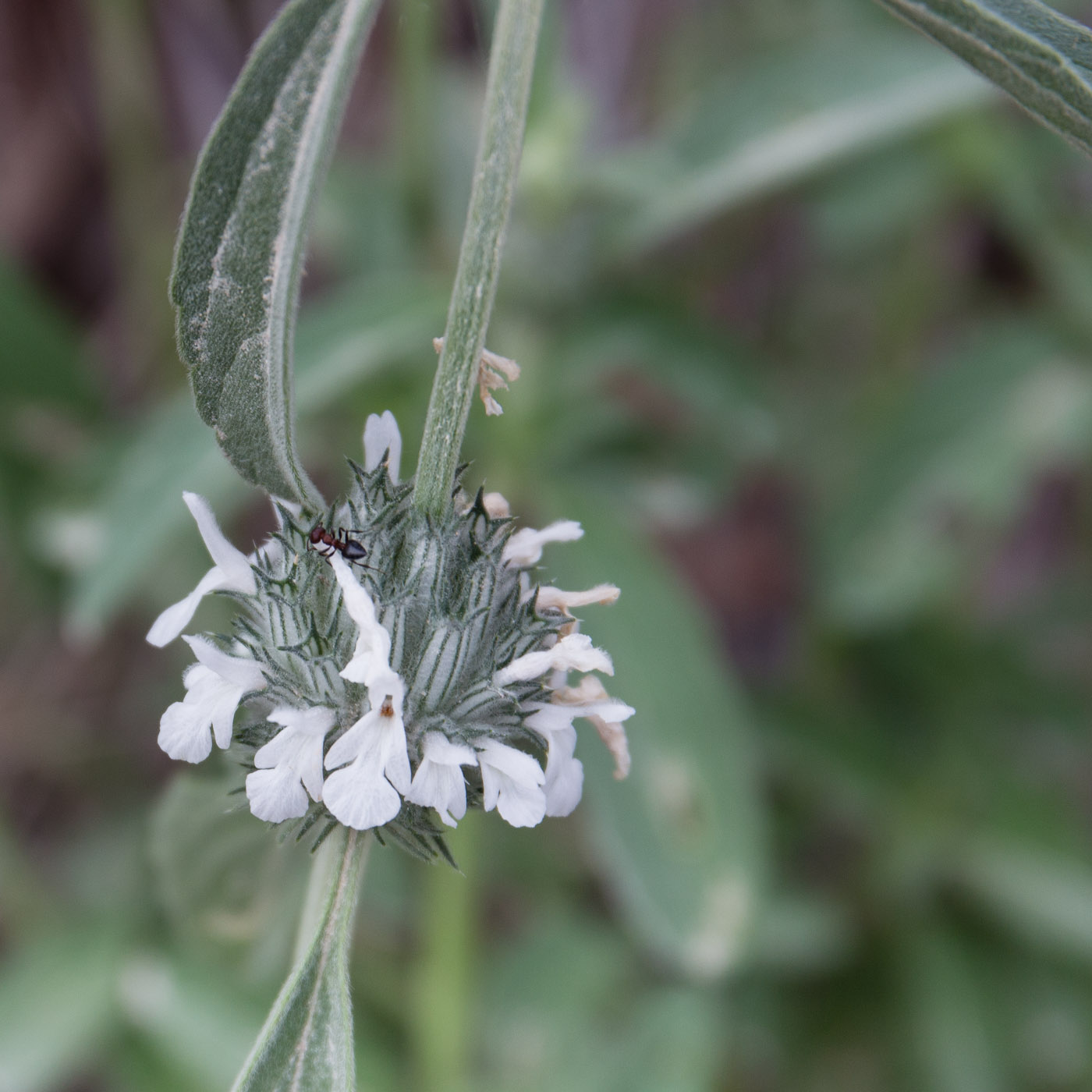

Conservation status
- Least Concern (SANBI Red List)

Scientific classification
- Kingdom: Plantae
- Clade: Tracheophytes
- Clade: Angiosperms
- Clade: Eudicots
- Clade: Asterids
- Order: Lamiales
- Family: Lamiaceae
- Genus: Acrotome
- Species: A. inflata

Binomial name
- Acrotome inflata Benth.

Synonyms
- Acrotome amboensis Briq.; Lasiocorys eenii (Hiern) Baker; Leucas eenii Hiern

= Acrotome inflata =

Species of plant

Acrotome inflata (horsefright or tumbleweed) is a species of flowering plant in the family Lamiaceae. This species is native to Africa. Acrotome inflata was first described in 1848 by George Bentham. The name "horsefright" is derived from the Afrikaans "perdeskrikbossie" (horse-fright bush).

== Characteristics ==
Acrotome inflata is an erect annual herb that grows up to 1 metre tall. Its stems are densely covered in appressed hairs. The arrangement of its leaves are opposite and are either sessile or shorty petiolate. The leaves range from being ovate, to being oblong-lanceolate and usually grow from 3–12 cm long (but are mostly wider on the lower part of the stem). Its leaves very hairy on both sides and its margins are rarely crenate-dentate. Its flowers are grouped in dense rows in inflorescences that come in verticils, it has many bracteoles, are filiforms that grow up to 1 centimetre long, are densely-hairy and are spine-tipped.' Its corolla come in colors varying from white to pale mauve.

== Habitat ==
Acrotome inflata usually thrives in dry tropical biomes, usually depending on the season.

== See also ==
- List of Lamiaceae of South Africa
