= Acrotome thorncroftii =

Scientific classification
- Kingdom: Plantae
- Clade: Tracheophytes
- Clade: Angiosperms
- Clade: Eudicots
- Clade: Asterids
- Order: Lamiales
- Family: Lamiaceae
- Genus: Acrotome
- Species: A. thorncroftii

Binomial name
- Acrotome thorncroftii Skan.

Species of plant

Acrotome thorncroftii, the Barberton horsefright, is a species of flowering plant in the family Lamiaceae. It is found from southern Mozambique to South Africa. It was first published in 1910.

== See also ==
- List of Lamiaceae of South Africa
