= Paralamium =

Scientific classification
- Kingdom: Plantae
- Clade: Tracheophytes
- Clade: Angiosperms
- Clade: Eudicots
- Clade: Asterids
- Order: Lamiales
- Family: Lamiaceae
- Subfamily: Lamioideae
- Genus: Paralamium; Dunn
- Species: P. griffithii

Binomial name
- Paralamium griffithii (Hook.f.) Suddee & A.J.Paton

Synonyms
- Plectranthus griffithii Hook.f.; Plectranthus crenulatus Hook.f.; Paralamium gracile Dunn; Plectranthus daoi Phuong

Genus of flowering plants

Paralamium is a genus of flowering plant in the family Lamiaceae, first described in 1913. It contains only one known species, Paralamium griffithii, native to Yunnan, Assam, Arunachal Pradesh, northern Myanmar, and northern Vietnam.
