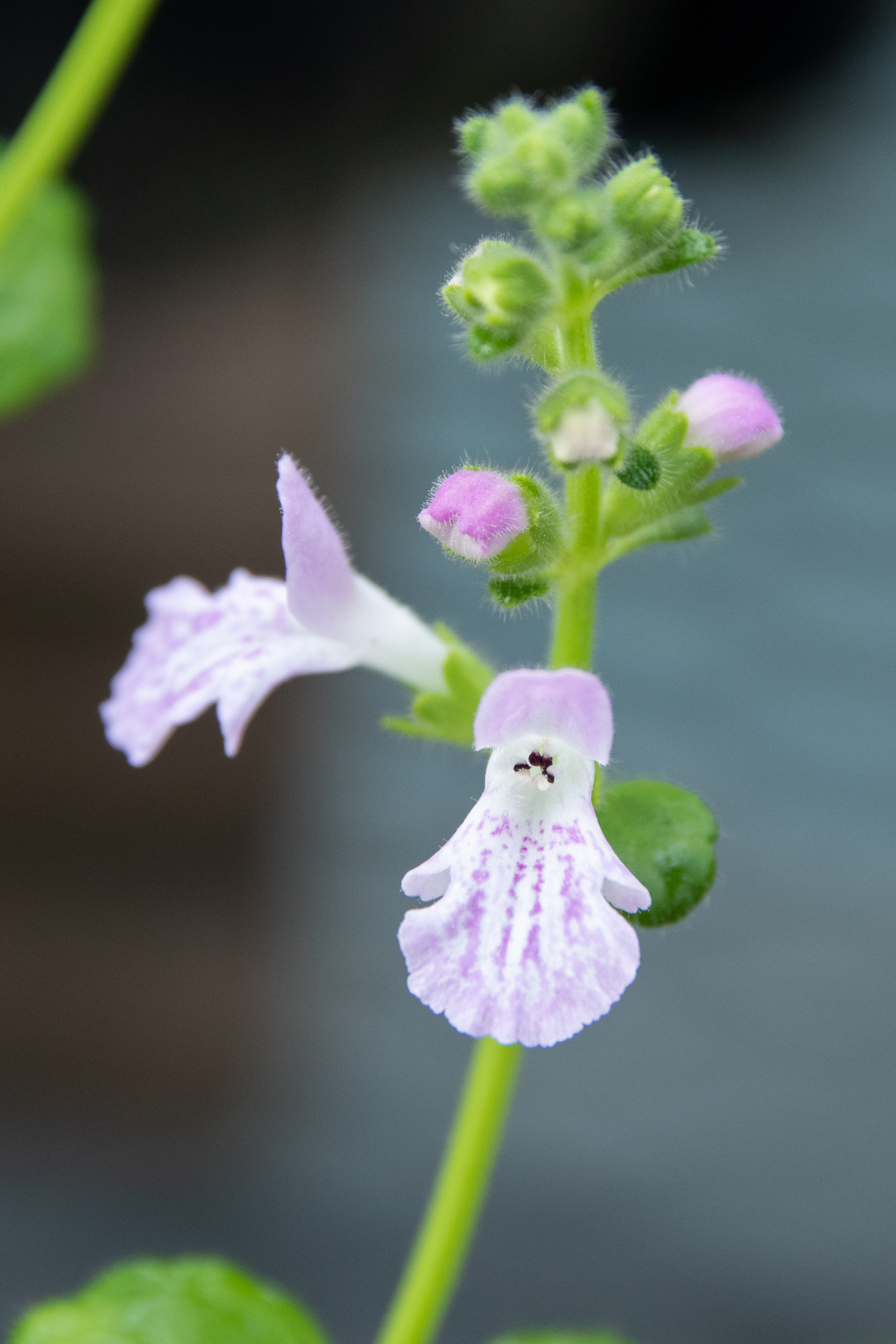
- Suzukia luchuensis

Scientific classification
- Kingdom: Plantae
- Clade: Tracheophytes
- Clade: Angiosperms
- Clade: Eudicots
- Clade: Asterids
- Order: Lamiales
- Family: Lamiaceae
- Subfamily: Lamioideae
- Genus: Suzukia; Kudô

Type species
- Suzukia shikikunensis Kudô

= Suzukia =

Genus of flowering plants

Suzukia is a genus of plants in the family Lamiaceae, first described in 1930. It contains two known species, native to Taiwan and the Ryukyu Islands (part of Japan).

Species

- Suzukia luchuensis Kudô - Lü Tao Island (also called Green Island) of Taiwan, Nansei-shoto (called the Ryukyu Islands) of Japan
- Suzukia shikikunensis Kudô - Taiwan
