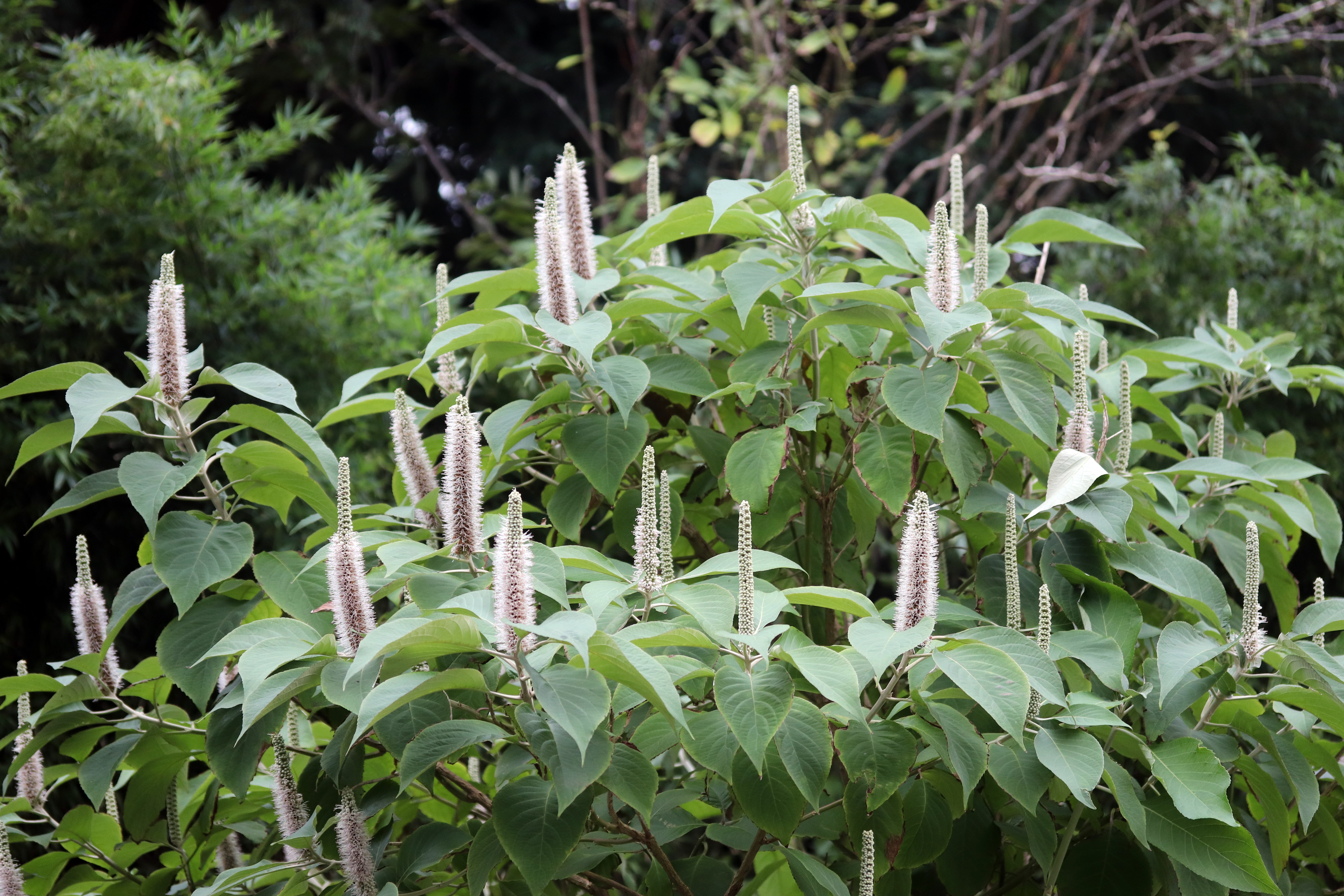
- Leucosceptrum canum

Scientific classification
- Kingdom: Plantae
- Clade: Tracheophytes
- Clade: Angiosperms
- Clade: Eudicots
- Clade: Asterids
- Order: Lamiales
- Family: Lamiaceae
- Subfamily: Lamioideae
- Genus: Leucosceptrum; Sm.
- Species: L. canum

Binomial name
- Leucosceptrum canum Sm.

Synonyms
- Clerodendrum leucosceptrum D.Don; Teucrium leucosceptrum (D.Don) Voigt; Teucrium macrostachyum Wall. ex Benth.; Comanthosphace nepalensis Kitam. & Murata

= Leucosceptrum =

Genus of plants

Leucosceptrum is a genus of flowering plant in the family Lamiaceae, first described in 1806. It contains only one known species, Leucosceptrum canum, native to south-western China (Sichuan, Tibet, Yunnan), the eastern Himalayas (Nepal, Bhutan, Assam, Nagaland, Bangladesh), and northern Indochina (Myanmar, Thailand, Laos, Vietnam).
