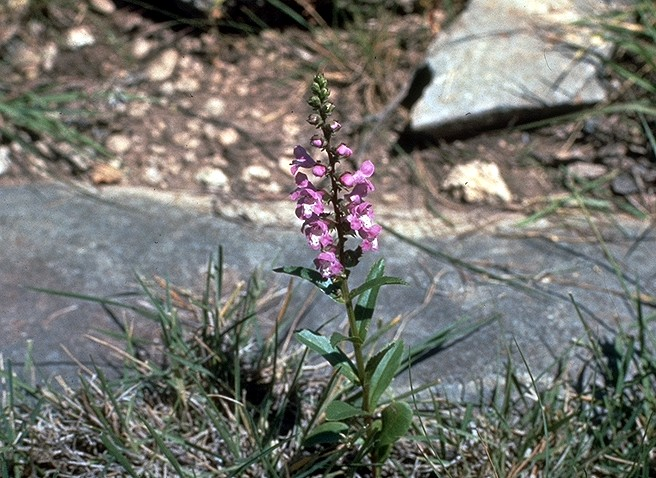

Scientific classification
- Kingdom: Plantae
- Clade: Tracheophytes
- Clade: Angiosperms
- Clade: Eudicots
- Clade: Asterids
- Order: Lamiales
- Family: Lamiaceae
- Subfamily: Lamioideae
- Genus: Warnockia; M.W. Turner
- Species: W. scutellarioides

Binomial name
- Warnockia scutellarioides (Engelm. & Gray) M.W. Turner

Synonyms
- Brazoria scutellarioides Engelm. & A.Gray; Brazoria roemeriana Scheele

= Warnockia =

Genus of flowering plants

Warnockia is a genus from the family Lamiaceae, first described in 1996. It contains only one known species, Warnockia scutellarioides, the prairie brazosmint, native to the south-central United States (Texas and Oklahoma) and northern Mexico (Coahuila).

== Etymology ==
The genus name honors Barton Warnock, a 20th-century Texan botanist.

The specific epithet scutellarioides (suffixed with -oides) means "Scutellaria-like", referring to a resemblance to another genus in the Lamiaceae.

It was also called the prairie brazoria, as it was formerly placed in the genus Brazoria.
