= Eurysolen =

Scientific classification
- Kingdom: Plantae
- Clade: Tracheophytes
- Clade: Angiosperms
- Clade: Eudicots
- Clade: Asterids
- Order: Lamiales
- Family: Lamiaceae
- Subfamily: Lamioideae
- Genus: Eurysolen; Prain
- Species: E. gracilis

Binomial name
- Eurysolen gracilis Prain

Genus of plants

Eurysolen is a genus of flowering plant in the family Lamiaceae, first described in 1898. It contains only one known species, Eurysolen gracilis. It is native to southern China (Yunnan Province), Assam, Myanmar, Thailand, and western Indonesia.
