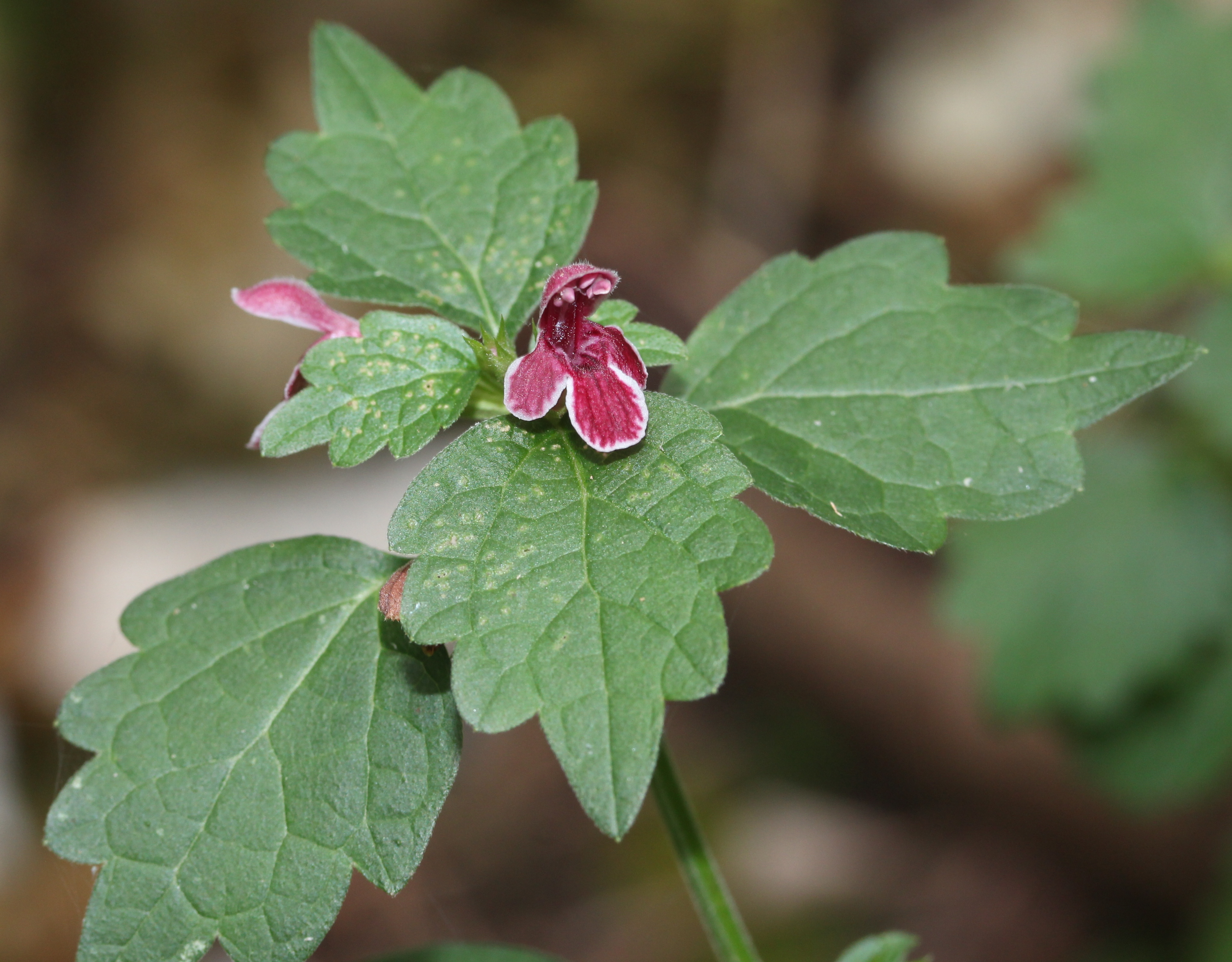
- Loxocalyx ambiguus in Mount Ibuki, Gifu pref., Japan

Scientific classification
- Kingdom: Plantae
- Clade: Tracheophytes
- Clade: Angiosperms
- Clade: Eudicots
- Clade: Asterids
- Order: Lamiales
- Family: Lamiaceae
- Subfamily: Lamioideae
- Genus: Loxocalyx; Hemsl.

= Loxocalyx =

Genus of flowering plants

Loxocalyx is a genus of plants in the family Lamiaceae, first described in 1891. It is native to China and Japan.

Species

- Loxocalyx ambiguus (Makino) Makino - Japan
- Loxocalyx quinquenervius Hand.-Mazz. - Hunan
- Loxocalyx urticifolius Hemsl. - Gansu, Guizhou, Hebei, Henan, Hubei, Shaanxi, Sichuan, Yunnan
