= Brazoria enquistii =

Conservation status
- Imperiled (NatureServe)

Scientific classification
- Kingdom: Plantae
- Clade: Tracheophytes
- Clade: Angiosperms
- Clade: Eudicots
- Clade: Asterids
- Order: Lamiales
- Family: Lamiaceae
- Genus: Brazoria
- Species: B. enquistii

Binomial name
- Brazoria enquistii M.W.Turner
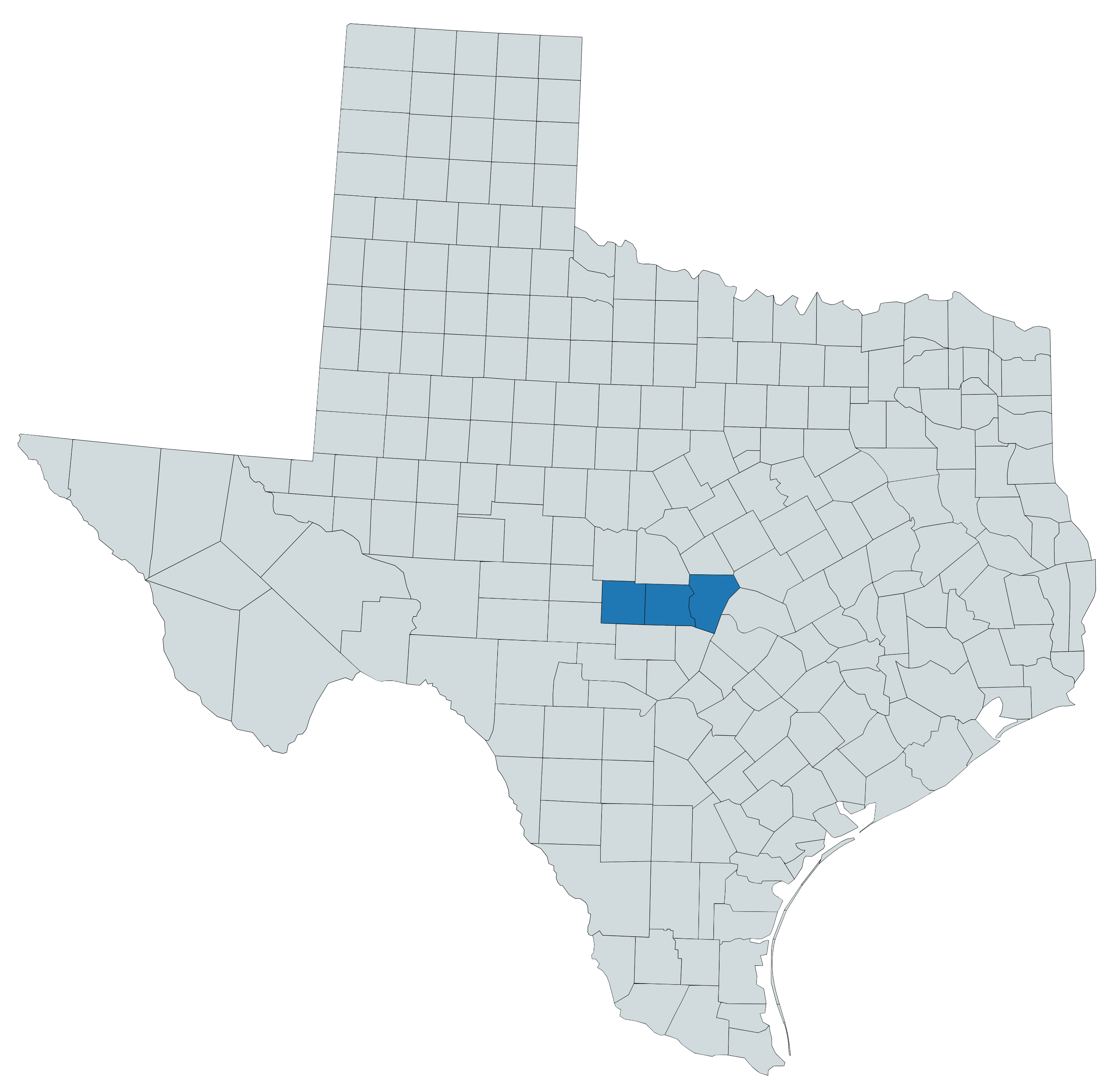
- Brazoria enquistii range

Species of flowering plant

Brazoria enquistii is a plant species in the family Lamiaceae. It is a rare plant known only from three counties in central Texas (Mason, Llano, Burnet).
