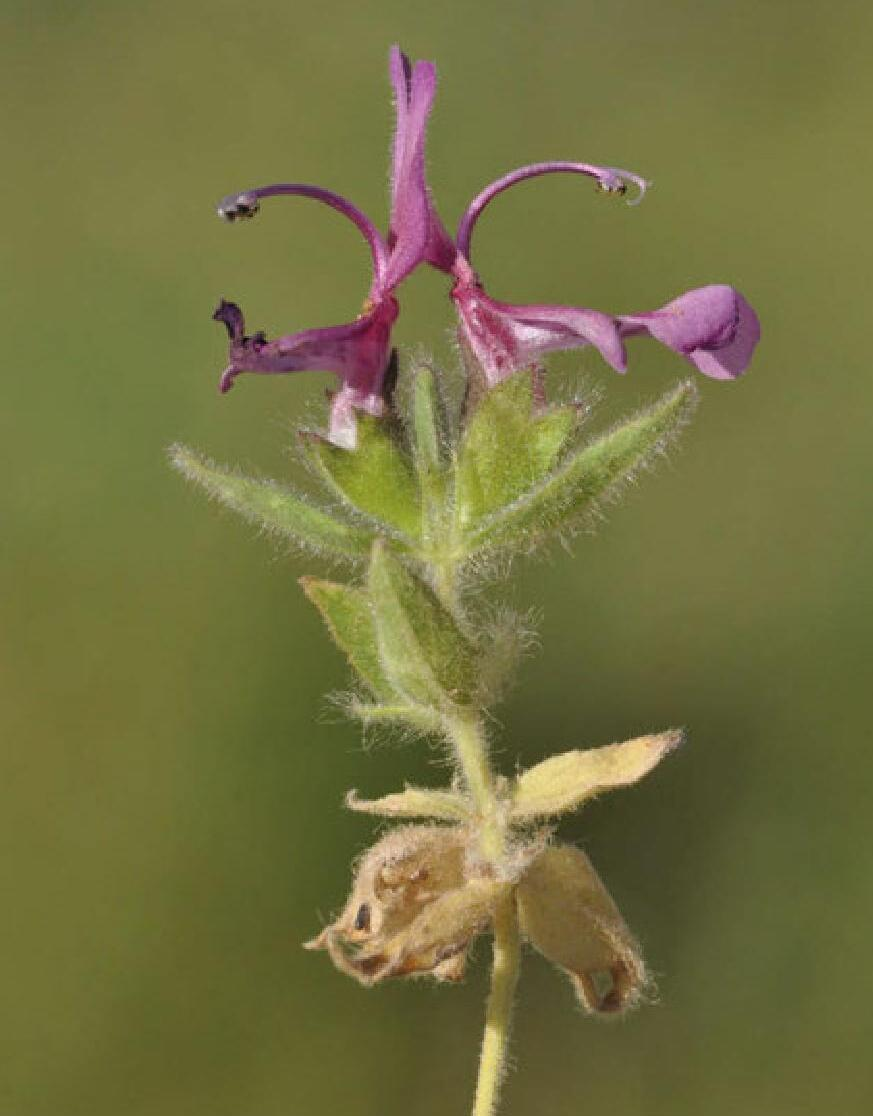
- Hypogomphia bucharica

Scientific classification
- Kingdom: Plantae
- Clade: Tracheophytes
- Clade: Angiosperms
- Clade: Eudicots
- Clade: Asterids
- Order: Lamiales
- Family: Lamiaceae
- Subfamily: Lamioideae
- Genus: Hypogomphia; Bunge

= Hypogomphia =

Genus of flowering plants

Hypogomphia is a genus of flowering plants in the mint family, Lamiaceae, first described in 1873. It is native to Iran, Afghanistan, and Central Asia.

Species

- Hypogomphia bucharica Vved. - Tajikistan
- Hypogomphia purpurea (Regel) Vved. ex Kochk. - Tajikistan
- Hypogomphia turkestana Bunge - Tajikistan, Kyrgyzstan, Uzbekistan, Afghanistan, Iran
