= Brazoria arenaria =

Sand brazos-mint

Scientific classification
- Kingdom: Plantae
- Clade: Tracheophytes
- Clade: Angiosperms
- Clade: Eudicots
- Clade: Asterids
- Order: Lamiales
- Family: Lamiaceae
- Genus: Brazoria
- Species: B. arenaria

Binomial name
- Brazoria arenaria Lundell

Species of flowering plant

Brazoria arenaria is a species of flowering plant in the mint family, Lamiaceae. It is sometimes referred to by the common name sand Brazos-mint. It was first described in 1945 and is endemic to southern Texas.
