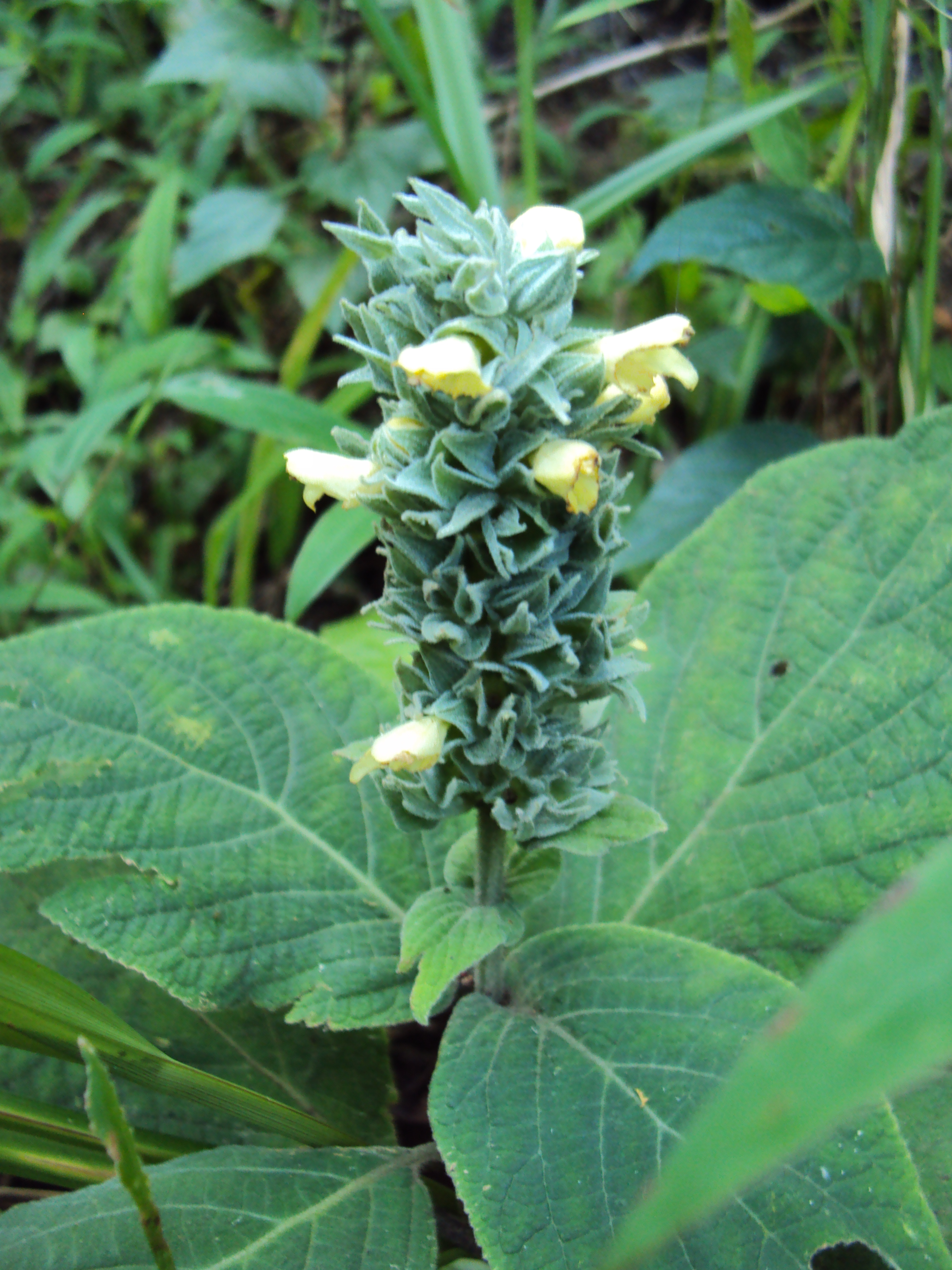
- Gomphostemma heyneanum

Scientific classification
- Kingdom: Plantae
- Clade: Tracheophytes
- Clade: Angiosperms
- Clade: Eudicots
- Clade: Asterids
- Order: Lamiales
- Family: Lamiaceae
- Subfamily: Lamioideae
- Genus: Gomphostemma; Wall. ex Benth.

Synonyms
- Taitonia Yamam.

= Gomphostemma =

Genus of flowering plants

Gomphostemma is a genus of flowering plants in the mint family, Lamiaceae, first described in 1830. It is native to Southeast Asia, China, and the Indian subcontinent.

Species

- Gomphostemma aborensis Dunn - Arunachal Pradesh
- Gomphostemma arbusculum C.Y.Wu - Yunnan
- Gomphostemma callicarpoides (Yamam.) Masam. - Taiwan
- Gomphostemma chinense Oliv. - Fujian, Guangdong, Guangxi, Hainan, Jiangxi, Vietnam
- Gomphostemma crinitum Wall. ex Benth. - Indochina, Yunnan, Assam, Bangladesh
- Gomphostemma curtisii Prain - Malaya, Sumatra, Borneo
- Gomphostemma deltodon C.Y.Wu - Yunnan
- Gomphostemma dolichobotrys Merr. - Sumatra
- Gomphostemma eriocarpum Benth. - southern India
- Gomphostemma grandiflorum Doan ex Suddee & A.J.Paton - Vietnam
- Gomphostemma hainanense C.Y.Wu - Hainan
- Gomphostemma hemsleyanum Prain ex Collett & Hemsl. - Java, Myanmar
- Gomphostemma heyneanum Wall. ex Benth. - southern India
- Gomphostemma hirsutum Walsingham - Sabah
- Gomphostemma inopinatum Prain - Myanmar
- Gomphostemma javanicum (Blume) Benth. - Indochina, Andaman Islands, Borneo, Sumatra, Java, Sulawesi, Bali, Lombok, Timor, Philippines
- Gomphostemma keralensis Vivek., Gopalan & R.Ansari. - Kerala
- Gomphostemma lacei Mukerjee - Myanmar
- Gomphostemma latifolium C.Y.Wu - Yunnan, Guangdong
- Gomphostemma leptodon Dunn - Guangxi, Vietnam
- Gomphostemma lucidum Wall. ex Benth. - Indochina, Assam, Bangladesh, Guangdong, Guangxi, Yunnan
- Gomphostemma mastersii Benth. ex Hook.f. - Assam, Bangladesh, Thailand
- Gomphostemma melissifolium Wall. ex Benth. - Assam, Bangladesh, Bhutan, Nepal
- Gomphostemma microcalyx Prain - Borneo, Malaya, Sumatra
- Gomphostemma microdon Dunn - Yunnan, Laos, Thailand, Vietnam
- Gomphostemma nayarii A.S.Chauhan - Assam
- Gomphostemma niveum Hook.f. - Assam, Arunachal Pradesh, Vietnam
- Gomphostemma nutans Hook.f. - Assam, Myanmar
- Gomphostemma ovatum Wall. ex Benth. - Assam, Bangladesh, Bhutan, Nepal
- Gomphostemma parviflorum Wall. ex Benth. - Assam, Bangladesh, Bhutan, Nepal, Yunnan, Indochina, Borneo, Java, Sumatra
- Gomphostemma pedunculatum Benth. ex Hook.f. - Assam, Yunnan, Vietnam
- Gomphostemma pseudocrinitum C.Y.Wu - Guangxi
- Gomphostemma salarkhanianum Khanam & M.A.Hassan - Sylhet District in Bangladesh
- Gomphostemma scortechinii Prain - Myanmar, Thailand, Malaya
- Gomphostemma stellatohirsutum C.Y.Wu - Yunnan
- Gomphostemma strobilinum Wall. ex Benth. - Bangladesh, Myanmar, Thailand, Vietnam
- Gomphostemma sulcatum C.Y.Wu - Yunnan
- Gomphostemma thomsonii Benth. ex Hook.f. - Assam
- Gomphostemma velutinum Benth. - Assam, Bangladesh
- Gomphostemma wallichii Prain - Assam, Myanmar, Thailand
