= Isoleucas =

Scientific classification
- Kingdom: Plantae
- Clade: Tracheophytes
- Clade: Angiosperms
- Clade: Eudicots
- Clade: Asterids
- Order: Lamiales
- Family: Lamiaceae
- Subfamily: Lamioideae
- Genus: Isoleucas; O.Schwartz

Genus of flowering plants

Isoleucas is a genus of flowering plants in the mint family, Lamiaceae, first described in 1939. It is native to Yemen and Somalia.

Species

- Isoleucas arabica O.Schwartz - Yemen
- Isoleucas somala (Patzak) Scheen - Somalia (= Ballota somala Patzak, Otostegia somala (Patzak) Sebald)
