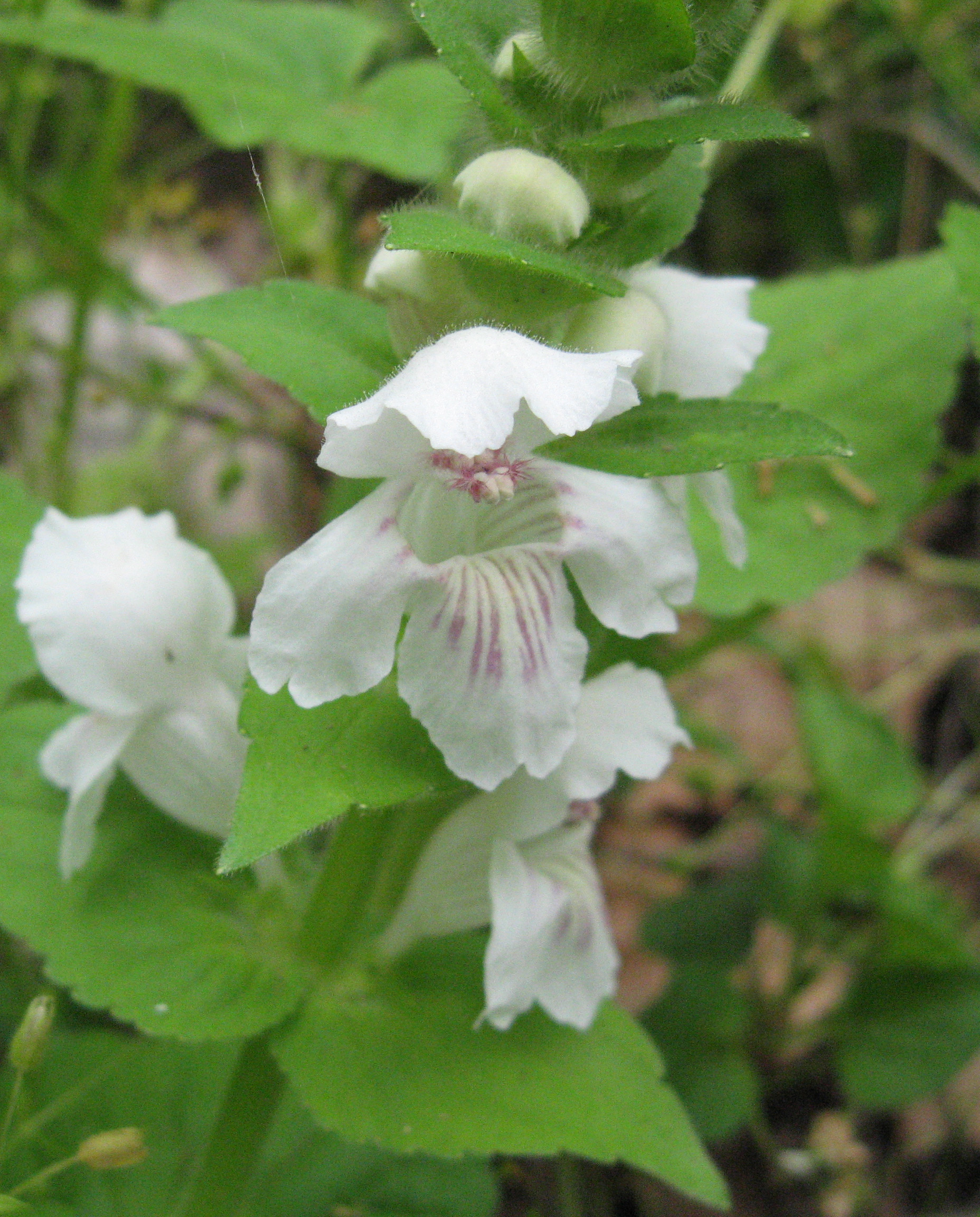

Conservation status
- Apparently Secure (NatureServe)

Scientific classification
- Kingdom: Plantae
- Clade: Tracheophytes
- Clade: Angiosperms
- Clade: Eudicots
- Clade: Asterids
- Order: Lamiales
- Family: Lamiaceae
- Subfamily: Lamioideae
- Genus: Synandra; Nutt.
- Species: S. hispidula

Binomial name
- Synandra hispidula (Michx.) Baill.

Synonyms
- Lamium hispidulum Michx. Synandra grandiflora Nutt. Torreya grandiflora Raf.

= Synandra =

Genus of flowering plants

Synandra is a monotypic genus of flowering plants in the mint family containing the single species Synandra hispidula, which is known by the common name Guyandotte beauty. It is native to the east-central United States where it ranges from southern Illinois to western North Carolina and Virginia.

== Description ==
This species has been reported to be an annual, biennial, or perennial herb, but studies show that it is a "strict biennial", at least in Kentucky and some populations in Ohio. It has oppositely arranged leaves with serrated edges. The large yellow and white or pinkish flowers bloom in April through June. The flowers are over 2 centimeters long and may reach 4 centimeters. Plants can have up to eight multiple branches on a single individual. Nutlets usually weight around 7 mg, with weights up to 13 mg. The nutlets store a high amount of endosperm.

== Habitat and ecology ==
This plant grows in shady, moist forest habitat, such as streambanks. It is commonly found with other mesic forest species such as the trees (Acer nigrum, Acer saccharum, Asimina triloba, and Tilia americana, and the wildflowers Jeffersonia diphylla, and Caulophyllum thalictroides.

This species appears to be sensitive to environmental changes, and it does not persist after the removal of the forest canopy or removal of the litter layer. This species is also browsed by deer, and mortality in post-grazed plants has been recorded. However, it is hypothesized that its hard nutlets may pass through the deer digestive tract such that deer play a role in dispersing this species. Flower stalks have been observed as fragile, lacking pith, and fall over during flowering and fruiting periods. This may also play a role in seed dispersal.

== Conservation ==
Though it is considered "secure" as a species, this plant has declined recently. It is now considered historic in North Carolina and it is listed as an endangered species in Illinois and critically imperiled in Alabama. It is more common in other states, such as Indiana. Its distribution in general is described as "scattered".

Threats to the species include habitat destruction and fragmentation, logging and other mechanisms that eliminate the shady canopy, overgrazing, trampling, recreational activity, and pollution. It is also threatened by introduced species of plants such as Lonicera japonica, Dioscorea oppositifolia and Microstegium vimineum.

== Etymology ==
The plant's common name comes from the Guyandotte River of West Virginia.
