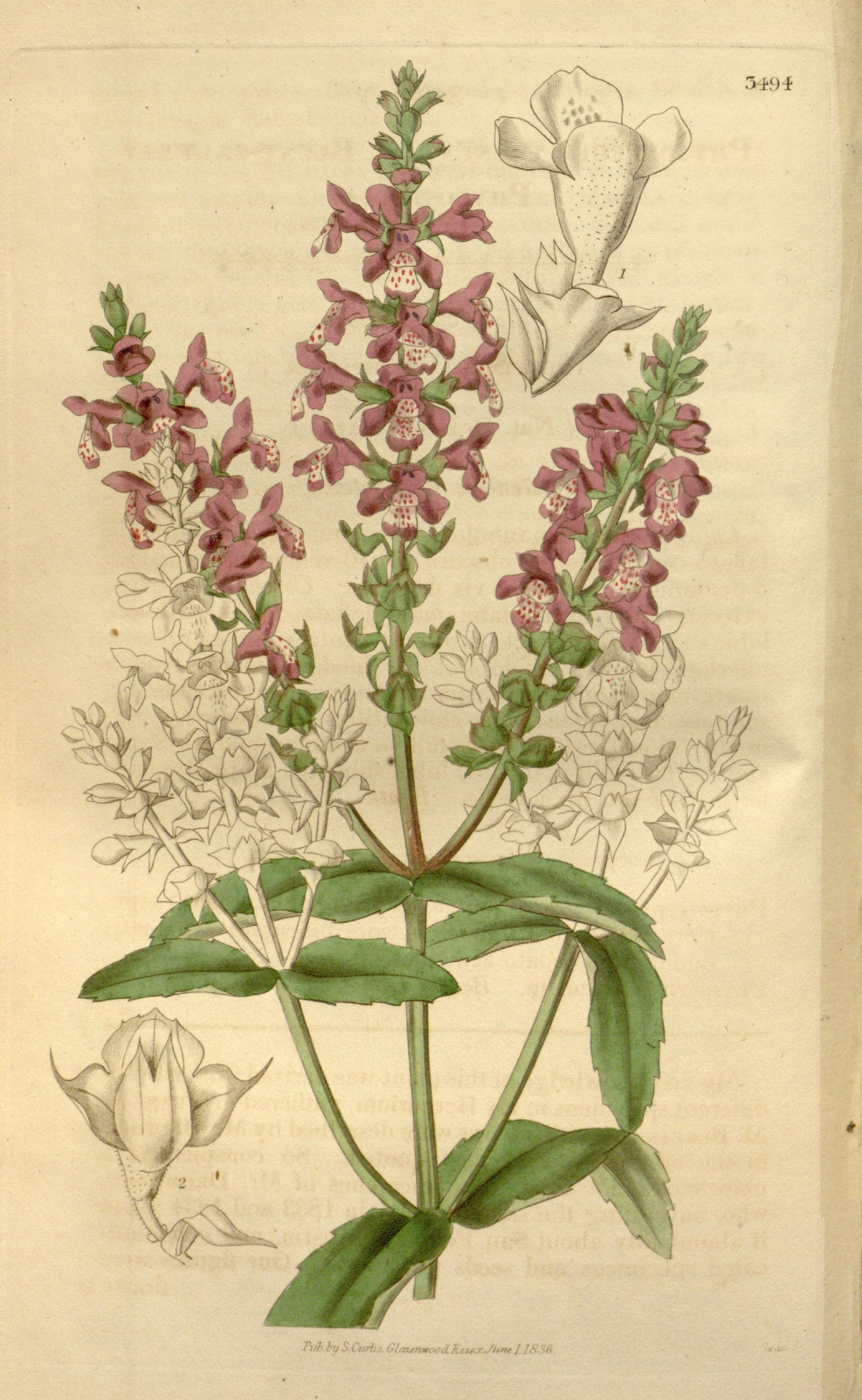

Scientific classification
- Kingdom: Plantae
- Clade: Tracheophytes
- Clade: Angiosperms
- Clade: Eudicots
- Clade: Asterids
- Order: Lamiales
- Family: Lamiaceae
- Genus: Brazoria
- Species: B. truncata

Binomial name
- Brazoria truncata (Benth.) Engelm. & A.Gray

Synonyms
- Physostegia truncata Benth.; Brazoria pulcherrima Lundell

= Brazoria truncata =

Species of flowering plant

Brazoria truncata, common name rattlesnake flower, is a plant species in the family Lamiaceae, first described in 1834. It is endemic to Texas, found in the south-central and eastern parts of the state.

Two varieties are recognized:

1. Brazoria truncata var. pulcherrima (Lundell) M.W.Turner – Centerville brazos-mint
2. Brazoria truncata var. truncata
