= Acrotome mozambiquensis =

Scientific classification
- Kingdom: Plantae
- Clade: Tracheophytes
- Clade: Angiosperms
- Clade: Eudicots
- Clade: Asterids
- Order: Lamiales
- Family: Lamiaceae
- Genus: Acrotome
- Species: A. mozambiquensis

Binomial name
- Acrotome mozambiquensis G.Taylor

Species of plant

Acrotome mozambiquensis is a species of flowering plant in the family Lamiaceae. It is native to South Mozambique. It was first published in 1935.
