= Stachys ilicifolius =

Scientific classification
- Kingdom: Plantae
- Clade: Embryophytes
- Clade: Tracheophytes
- Clade: Angiosperms
- Clade: Eudicots
- Clade: Asterids
- Order: Lamiales
- Family: Lamiaceae
- Subfamily: Lamioideae
- Genus: Stachys
- Species: S. ilicifolius

Binomial name
- Stachys ilicifolius (Schrenk ex Fisch. & C.A.Mey.) Sennikov

Synonyms
- Chamaesphacos ilicifolius Schrenk ex Fisch. & C.A.Mey.; Chamaesphacos longiflorus Bornm. & Sint.

Species of flowering plant

Stachys ilicifolius is a species of flowering plant in the family Lamiaceae. it is an annual native to Central Asia (Iran, Afghanistan, Kazakhstan, Uzbekistan, Turkmenistan, Tajikistan, and Xinjiang).

The species was first described as Chamaesphacos ilicifolius in 1841, and placed in the newly-described genus Chamaesphacos. Phylogenetic studies found that Chamaesphacos was embedded in the large genus Stachys, and in 2021 Alexander Nikolaevitsch Sennikov placed the species there as Stachys ilicifolius.
