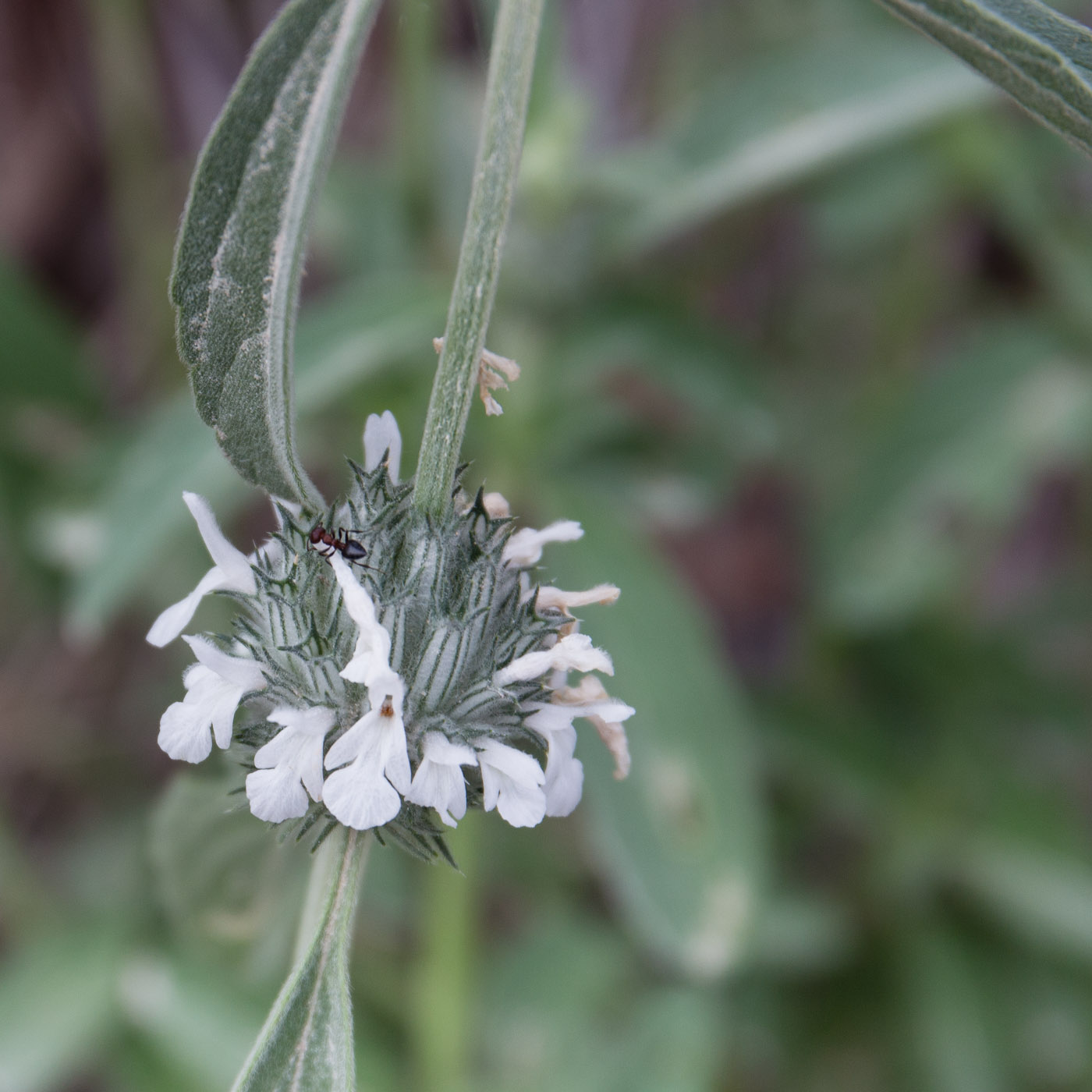
- Acrotome inflata

Scientific classification
- Kingdom: Plantae
- Clade: Tracheophytes
- Clade: Angiosperms
- Clade: Eudicots
- Clade: Asterids
- Order: Lamiales
- Family: Lamiaceae
- Subfamily: Lamioideae
- Genus: Acrotome; Benth. ex Endl.

= Acrotome =

Genus of flowering plants

Acrotome (horsefrights) is a genus of plants in the family Lamiaceae, first described in 1838. The genus is native to the southern part of Africa.

== Species ==
As of March 2025, Plants of the World Online accepted these species:

- Acrotome angustifolia G.Taylor - Zimbabwe, Botswana, Namibia, Cape Province, Transvaal
- Acrotome fleckii (Gürke) Launert - Namibia
- Acrotome hispida Benth. - KwaZulu-Natal, Eswatini, Transvaal
- Acrotome inflata Benth. - South Africa, Angola, Zambia, Zimbabwe, Namibia, Botswana, Lesotho
- Acrotome mozambiquensis G.Taylor - Mozambique
- Acrotome pallescens Benth. - Namibia, Cape Province
- Acrotome tenuis G.Taylor - Zambia
- Acrotome thorncroftii Skan - KwaZulu-Natal, Eswatini, Transvaal, Mozambique
