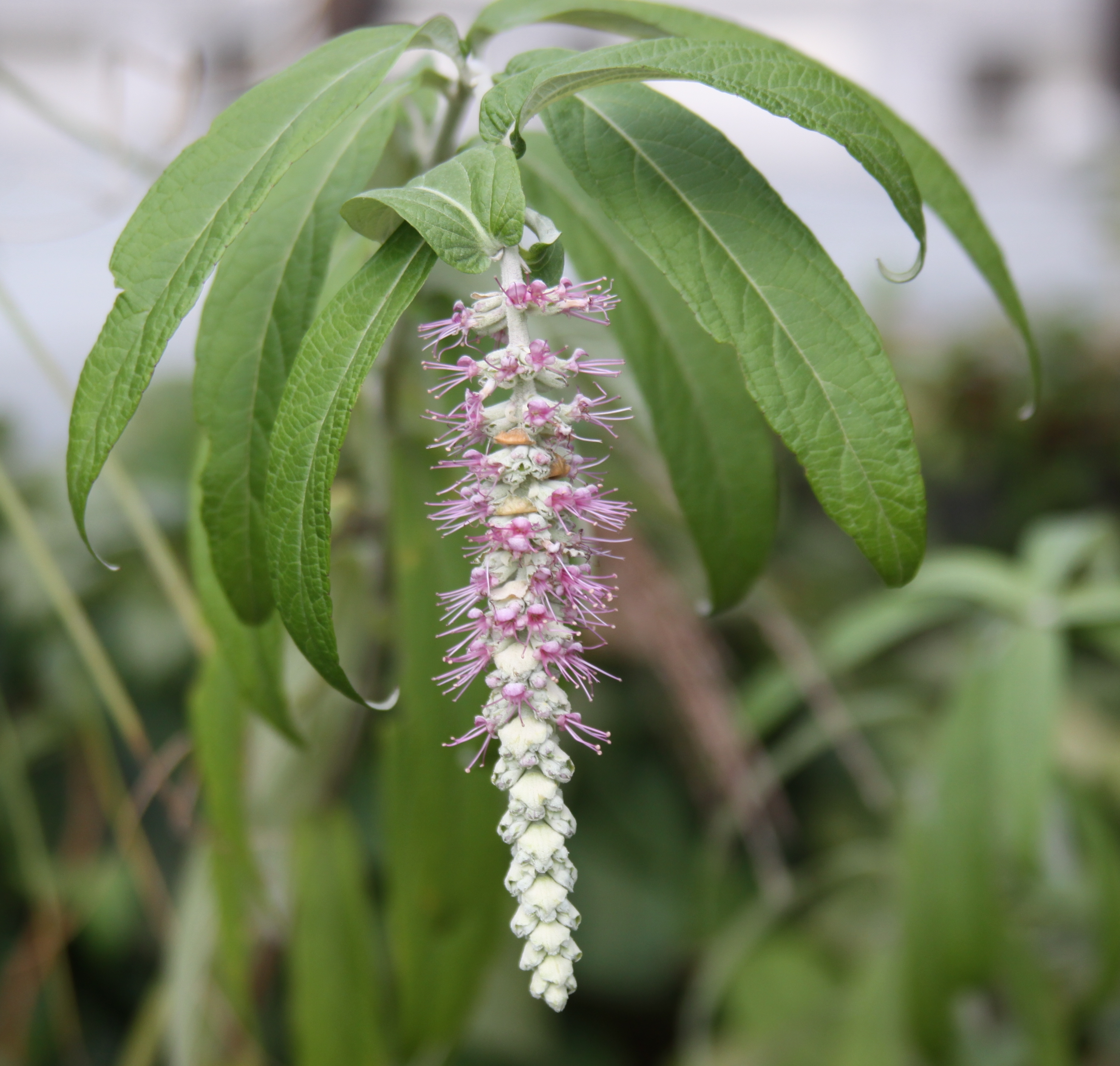
- Rostrinucula dependens

Scientific classification
- Kingdom: Plantae
- Clade: Tracheophytes
- Clade: Angiosperms
- Clade: Eudicots
- Clade: Asterids
- Order: Lamiales
- Family: Lamiaceae
- Subfamily: Lamioideae
- Genus: Rostrinucula; Kudô

Type species
- Rostrinucula dependens (Rehder) Kudô

= Rostrinucula =

Genus of flowering plants

Rostrinucula is a genus of flowering plants in the family Lamiaceae, first described as a genus in 1929. It has two known species, both endemic to China.

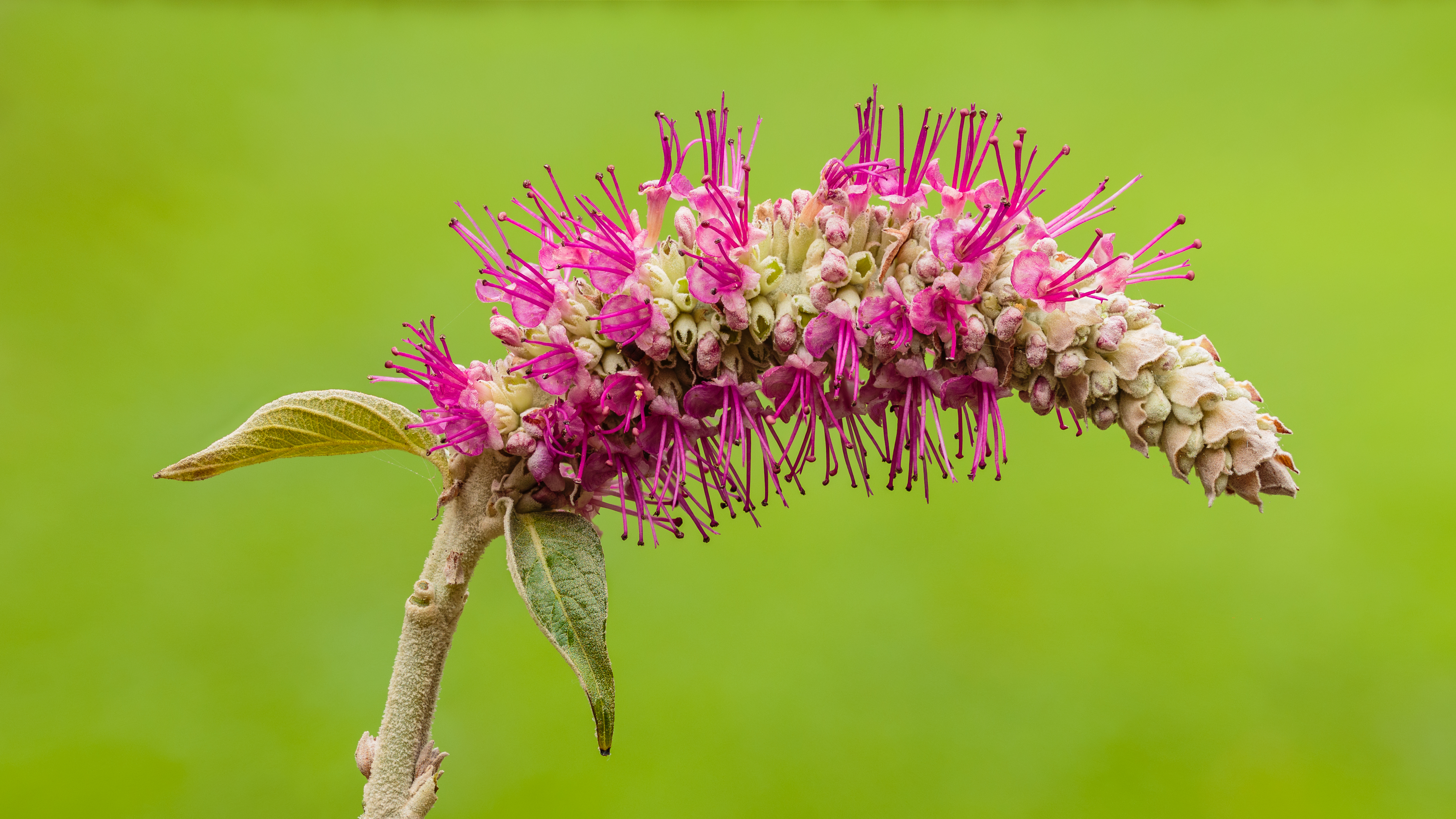
Inflorescence of a Rostrinucula dependens.

Species

- Rostrinucula dependens (Rehder) Kudô - Guizhou, Shaanxi, Sichuan, Yunnan
- Rostrinucula sinensis (Hemsl.) C.Y.Wu - Guangxi, Guizhou, Hubei, Hunan
