= Acrotome pallescens =

- In Namibia

Scientific classification
- Kingdom: Plantae
- Clade: Tracheophytes
- Clade: Angiosperms
- Clade: Eudicots
- Clade: Asterids
- Order: Lamiales
- Family: Lamiaceae
- Genus: Acrotome
- Species: A. pallescens

Binomial name
- Acrotome pallescens Benth.

Synonyms
- Stachys steingroeveri Briq.

Species of plant

Acrotome pallescens is a species of flowering plant in the family Lamiaceae. It is native to Namibia and the Cape Provinces of South Africa. The name was first published in 1848.

== See also ==
- List of Lamiaceae of South Africa
