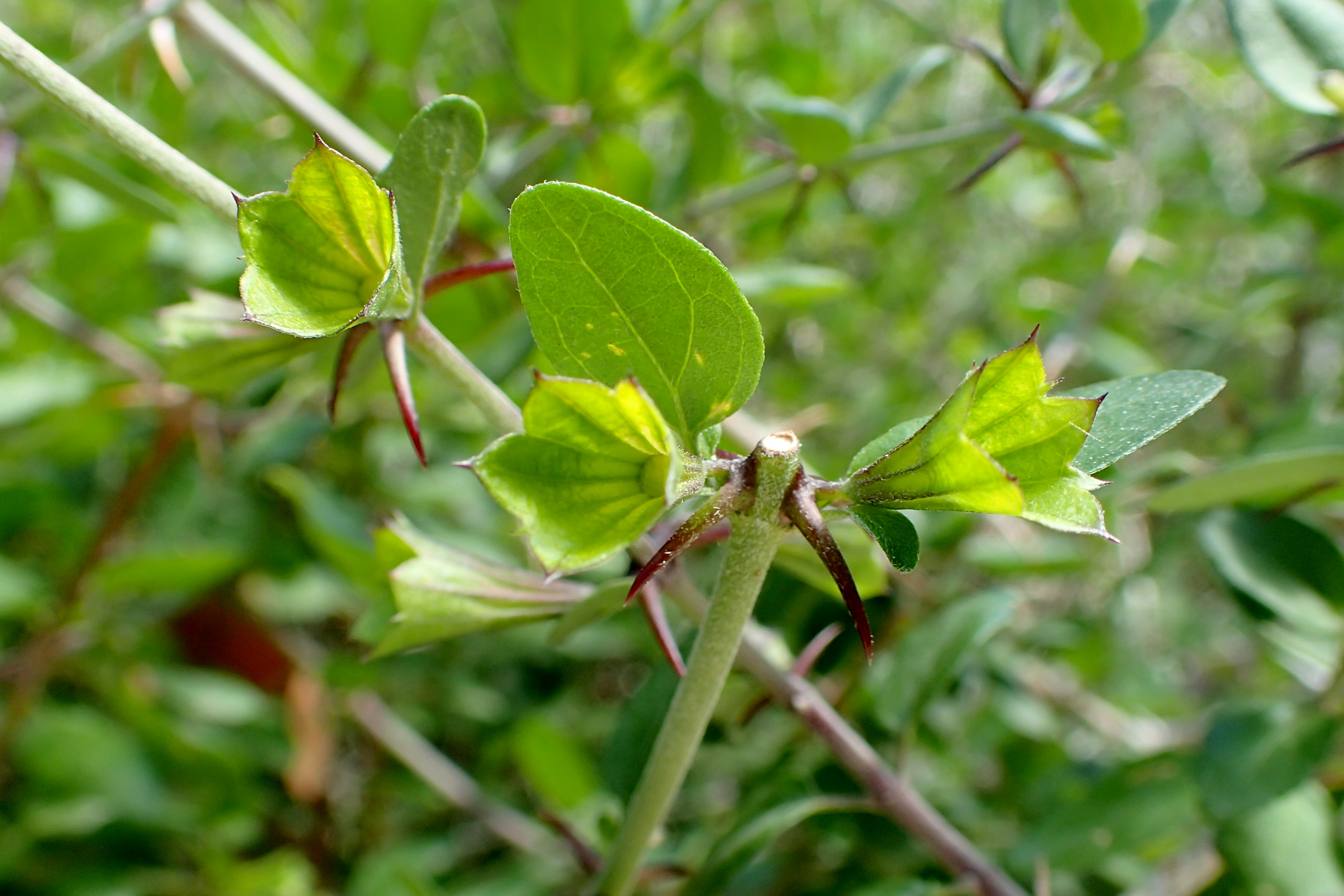

Scientific classification
- Kingdom: Plantae
- Clade: Tracheophytes
- Clade: Angiosperms
- Clade: Eudicots
- Clade: Asterids
- Order: Lamiales
- Family: Lamiaceae
- Subfamily: Lamioideae
- Tribe: Marrubieae
- Genus: Acanthoprasium (Benth.) Spach

Species
- Acanthoprasium frutescens (L.) Spenn.; Acanthoprasium integrifolium (Benth.) Ryding

= Acanthoprasium =

Genus of flowering plants

Acanthoprasium is a genus in the family Lamiaceae which is found in Cyprus, Italy, France. It contains the species Acanthoprasium frutescens (L.) Spenn., Acanthoprasium integrifolium (Benth.) Ryding.
