= Acrotome tenuis =

Scientific classification
- Kingdom: Plantae
- Clade: Tracheophytes
- Clade: Angiosperms
- Clade: Eudicots
- Clade: Asterids
- Order: Lamiales
- Family: Lamiaceae
- Genus: Acrotome
- Species: A. tenuis

Binomial name
- Acrotome tenuis G.Taylor

Species of plant

Acrotome tenuis is a species of flowering plant in the family Lamiaceae. It is native to North Zambia. It was first published in 1932.
