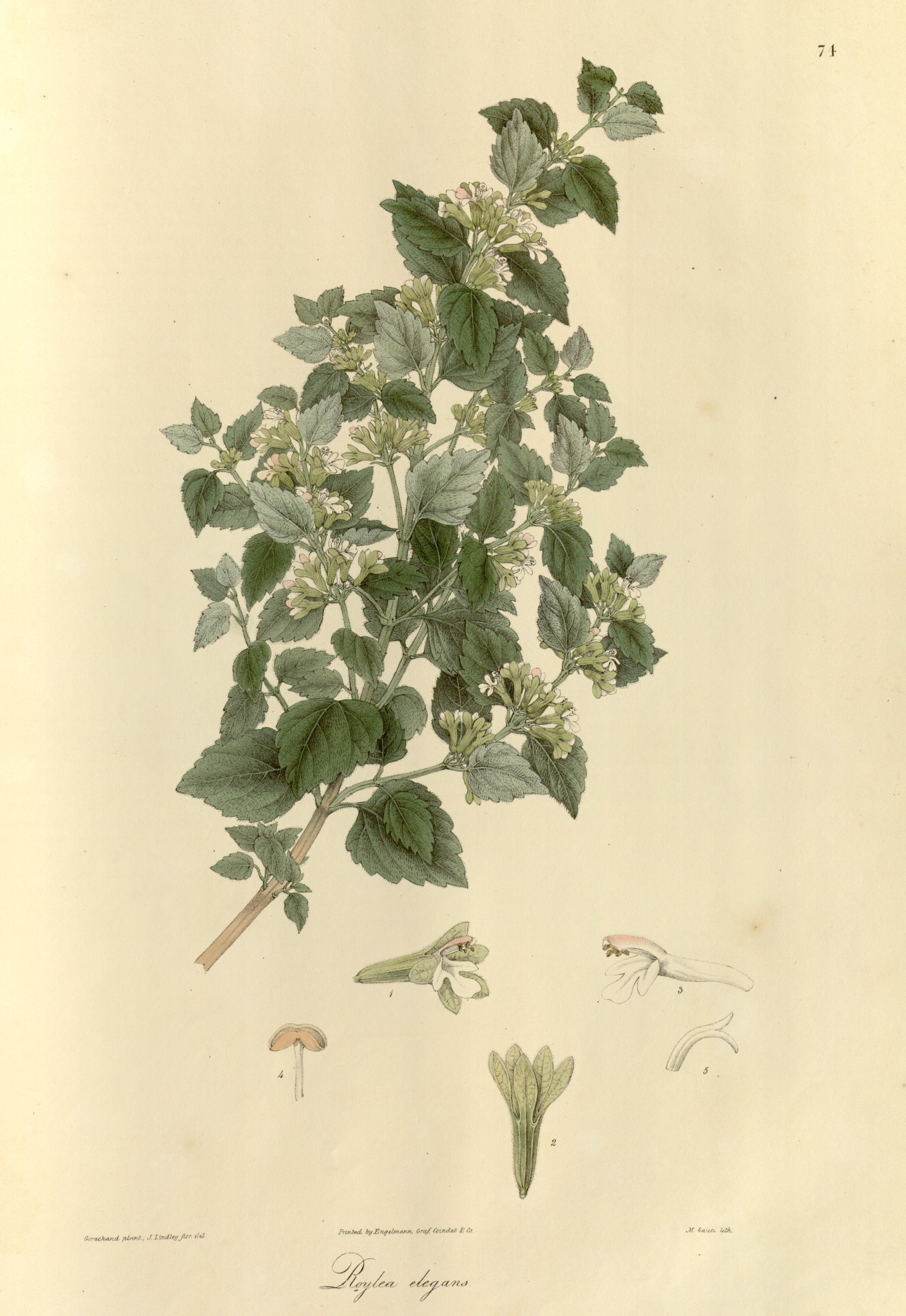
- Botanical drawing, 1830, of Roylea elegans (now Roylea cinerea)

Scientific classification
- Kingdom: Plantae
- Clade: Tracheophytes
- Clade: Angiosperms
- Clade: Eudicots
- Clade: Asterids
- Order: Lamiales
- Family: Lamiaceae
- Subfamily: Lamioideae
- Genus: Roylea; Wall. ex Benth.
- Species: R. cinerea

Binomial name
- Roylea cinerea (D.Don) Baill.

Synonyms
- Ballota cinerea D.Don; Roylea elegans Wall. ex Benth.; Phlomis calycina Roxb.; Roylea calycina (Roxb.) Briq.

= Roylea =

Genus of flowering plants

Roylea is a genus of flowering plant in the family Lamiaceae, first described as a genus in 1830. It contains only one known species, Roylea cinerea, native to the Western Himalayas of Nepal and northern India.
