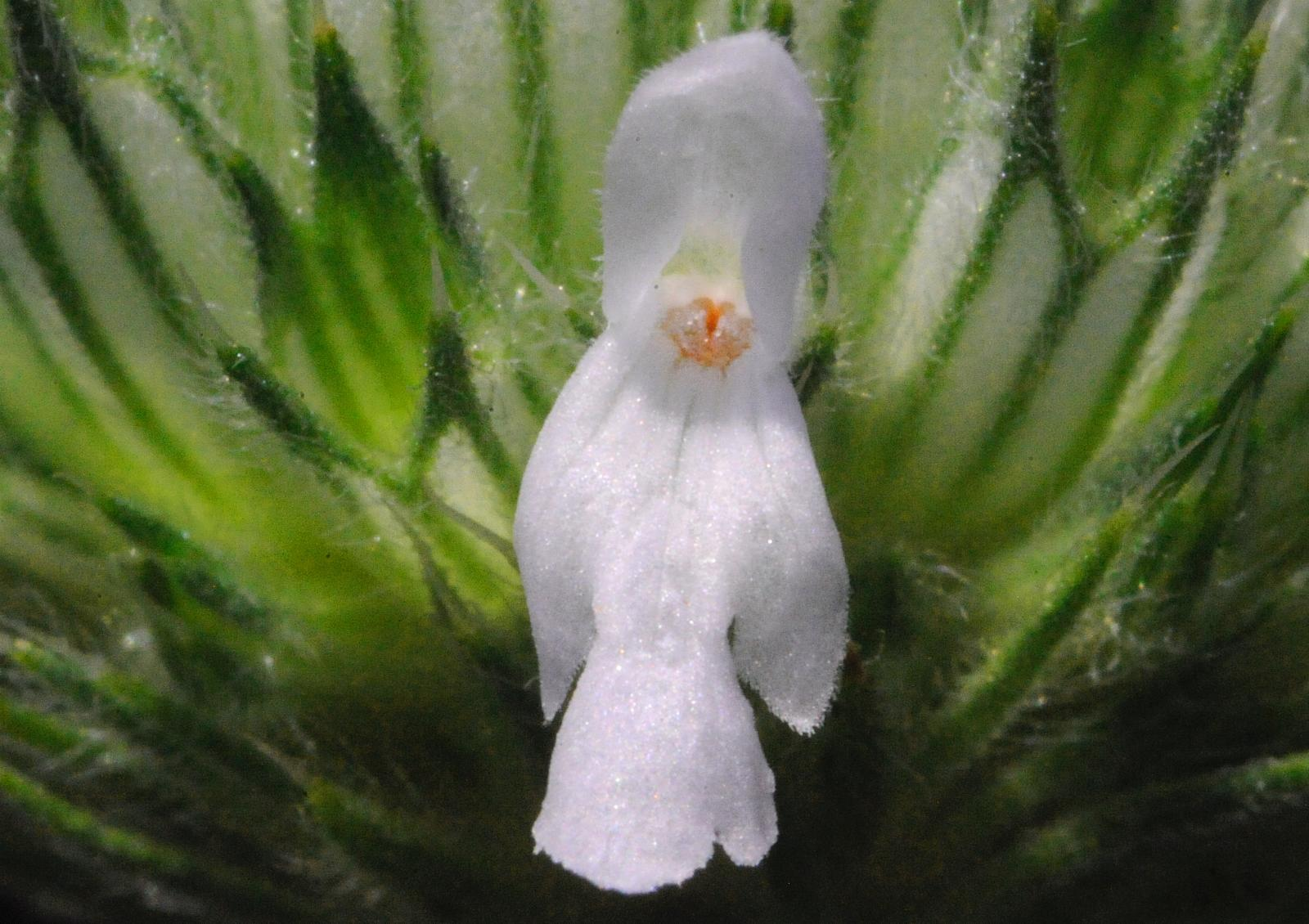

Scientific classification
- Kingdom: Plantae
- Clade: Tracheophytes
- Clade: Angiosperms
- Clade: Eudicots
- Clade: Asterids
- Order: Lamiales
- Family: Lamiaceae
- Genus: Acrotome
- Species: A. angustifolia

Binomial name
- Acrotome angustifolia G. Taylor

= Acrotome angustifolia =

Species of plant in the mint family

Acrotome angustifolia (narrowleaf horsefright) is a species of flowering plant in the family Lamiaceae. It is native to Zambia and South Africa.

== See also ==
- List of Lamiaceae of South Africa
