= Barton Holland Warnock =

American botanist (1911–1998)

- Born: July 1911; Christoval, Texas
- Died: June 9, 1998 (aged 86)
- Education: University of Texas; Sul Ross State University
- Scientific career
- Fields: Botany
- Workplaces: Sul Ross State University

Barton Holland Warnock (1911–1998) was an American botanist and leading authority on flora of the Trans-Pecos area and northern Chihuahua Desert.

== Biography ==
Born in Christoval, Texas in July 1911, Warnock grew up at Fort Stockton, Texas and by 1937 graduated from Sul Ross State University (then Sul Ross State College) in Alpine, Texas. He received a master's degree from the University of Iowa and a Ph.D. from the University of Texas in Austin.

In 1946 Warnock joined the faculty of Sul Ross State College and a year later was named biology department chair. He worked there for more than 50 years until retirement, during which he continued collecting various plant species in the region. He wrote three books from 1970 to 1977 and was working on a fourth volume.

Warnock died from a heart attack at the age of 86 on June 9, 1998 while driving a car near Alpine. After his death the Sul Ross science building was named after him. The Barton Warnock Environmental Education Visitor Center in Big Bend Ranch State Park near Lajitas in Brewster County, Texas, also bears his name and houses his extensive collection of plant specimens. An endemic genus of plants Lamiaceae (Warnockia) is named in his honor as well.

== Publications ==
- Barton H. Warnock (1970). Wildflowers of the Big Bend country, Texas. Sul Ross State Univ. p. 155.
- Barton H. Warnock (1974). Wildflowers of the Guadalupe Mountains and the Sand Dune Country, Texas. Sul Ross State Univ. p. 176.
- Barton H. Warnock (1977). Wildflowers of the Davis Mountains and the Marathon Basin. Sul Ross State Univ. p. 274.
