= Panzerina =

Scientific classification
- Kingdom: Plantae
- Clade: Tracheophytes
- Clade: Angiosperms
- Clade: Eudicots
- Clade: Asterids
- Order: Lamiales
- Family: Lamiaceae
- Subfamily: Lamioideae
- Genus: Panzerina; Soják

Synonyms
- Panzeria Moench 1794 not J.F. Gmel. 1791; Leonuroides Rauschert, superfluous name

Genus of flowering plants

Panzerina is a genus of plants in the Lamiaceae first described in 1982. It contains 2 known species, native to Siberia, China, and Mongolia.

Species

- Panzerina canescens (Bunge) Soják - Mongolia, Xinjiang, Altai Republic
- Panzerina lanata (L.) Soják - Mongolia, Xinjiang, Gansu, Nei Mongol, Ningxia, Shaanxi, Altai Republic, Chita, Tuva, Buryatiya, Irkutsk
