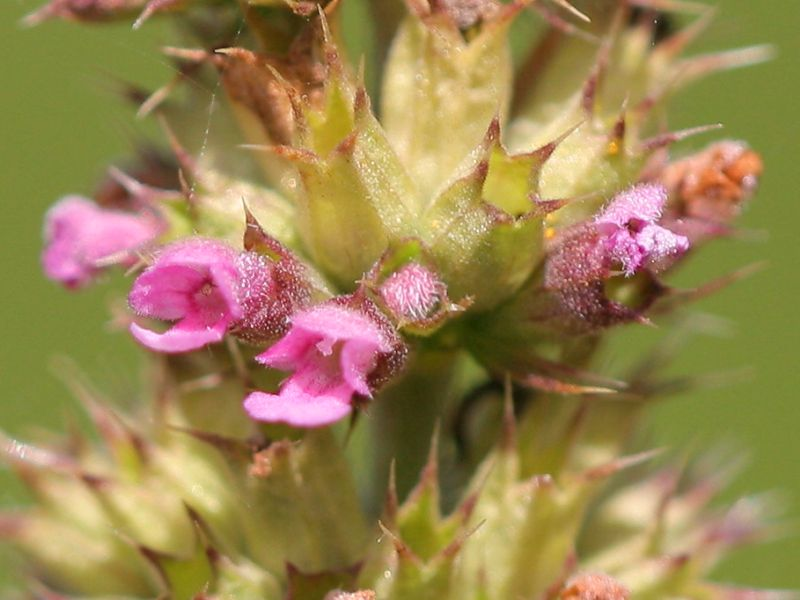

Scientific classification
- Kingdom: Plantae
- Clade: Tracheophytes
- Clade: Angiosperms
- Clade: Eudicots
- Clade: Asterids
- Order: Lamiales
- Family: Lamiaceae
- Subfamily: Lamioideae
- Genus: Chaiturus; Ehrh. ex Willd.
- Species: C. marrubiastrum

Binomial name
- Chaiturus marrubiastrum (L.) Ehrh. ex Rchb.

Synonyms
- Leonurus marrubiastrum L.; Cardiaca marrubiastrum (L.) Schreb.; Chaiturus leonuroides Willd.; Leonurus parviflorus Salisb. 1796 not Moench 1794; Leonurus marrubiastrum var. simplicissimus K.Koch; Leonurus marrubifolius St.-Lag.; Chaiturus marrubifolius St.-Lag.

= Chaiturus =

Genus of flowering plants

Chaiturus is a genus of plants in the family Lamiaceae, first described in 1787. It contains only one known species, Chaiturus marrubiastrum, native to central and southern Europe (Germany, Poland, Spain, Italy, Balkans, Ukraine, etc.), Russia, Turkey, Caucasus, and Central Asia (Altai, Xinjiang, Kazakhstan, Uzbekistan, Kyrgyzstan). False motherwort is a common name for this species.
