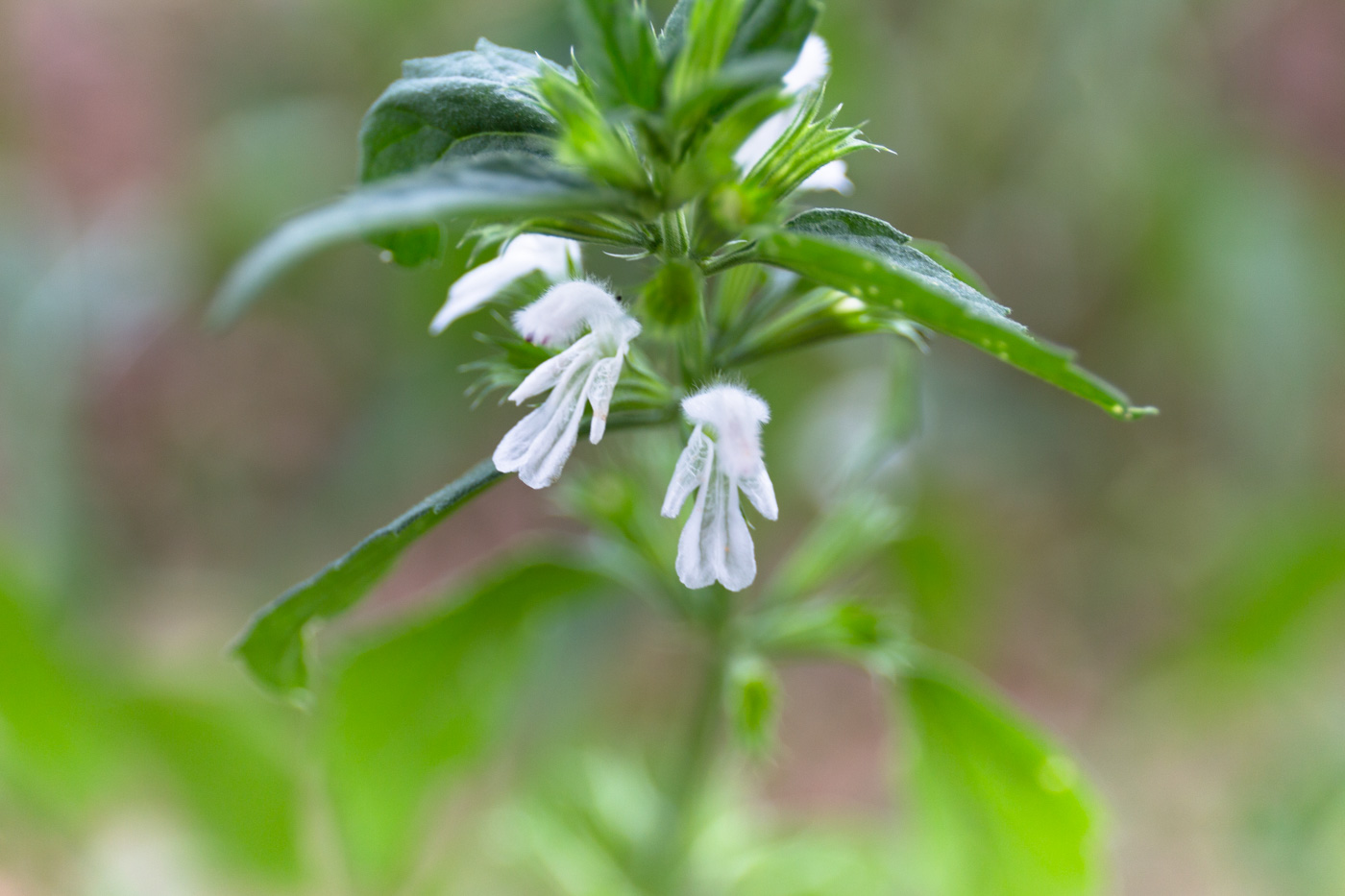

Scientific classification
- Kingdom: Plantae
- Clade: Tracheophytes
- Clade: Angiosperms
- Clade: Eudicots
- Clade: Asterids
- Order: Lamiales
- Family: Lamiaceae
- Genus: Acrotome
- Species: A. fleckii

Binomial name
- Acrotome fleckii (Gürke) Launert

= Acrotome fleckii =

Species of plant in the mint family

Acrotome fleckii is a species of flowering plant in the family Lamiaceae. It is native to Namibia.
