= Microtoena =

Scientific classification
- Kingdom: Plantae
- Clade: Tracheophytes
- Clade: Angiosperms
- Clade: Eudicots
- Clade: Asterids
- Order: Lamiales
- Family: Lamiaceae
- Subfamily: Lamioideae
- Genus: Microtoena; Prain

Genus of flowering plants

Microtoena is a genus of flowering plants in the mint family, Lamiaceae, first described in 1889. It is native to eastern and southeastern Asia, primarily China.

Species

1. Microtoena albescens C.Y.Wu & S.J.Hsuan - Guizhou
2. Microtoena bhutanica Stearn - Bhutan
3. Microtoena coreana H.Lév - Korea
4. Microtoena delavayi Prain - Sichuan, Yunnan
5. Microtoena esquirolii H.Lév. - Yunnan, Guizhou, Guangxi
6. Microtoena griffithii Prain - Arunachal Pradesh, Bangladesh
7. Microtoena insuavis (Hance) Prain ex Briq. - Thailand, Vietnam, Guangdong, Guizhou, Yunnan
8. Microtoena longisepala C.Y.Wu - Sichuan
9. Microtoena maireana Hand.-Mazz. - Yunnan
10. Microtoena megacalyx C.Y.Wu - Guizhou, Yunnan
11. Microtoena miyiensis C.Y.Wu & H.W.Li - Sichuan
12. Microtoena mollis H.Lév. - Guizhou, Yunnan, Guangxi
13. Microtoena moupinensis (Franch.) Prain - Tibet, Sichuan
14. Microtoena muliensis C.Y.Wu - Sichuan
15. Microtoena nepalensis Stearn - Nepal
16. Microtoena omeiensis C.Y.Wu & S.J.Hsuan - Sichuan
17. Microtoena patchoulii (C.B.Clarke ex Hook.f.) C.Y.Wu & S.J.Hsuan - from Yunnan + Nepal south to Java
18. Microtoena pauciflora C.Y.Wu - Yunnan
19. Microtoena praineana Diels - Guizhou, Sichuan, Yunnan
20. Microtoena robusta Hemsl. - Sichuan, Hubei
21. Microtoena stenocalyx C.Y.Wu & S.J.Hsuan - Yunnan
22. Microtoena urticifolia Hemsl. - Hubei, Hunan
23. Microtoena vanchingshanensis C.Y.Wu & S.J.Hsuan - Guizhou
24. Microtoena wardii Stearn - Tibet, Bhutan, Arunachal Pradesh
