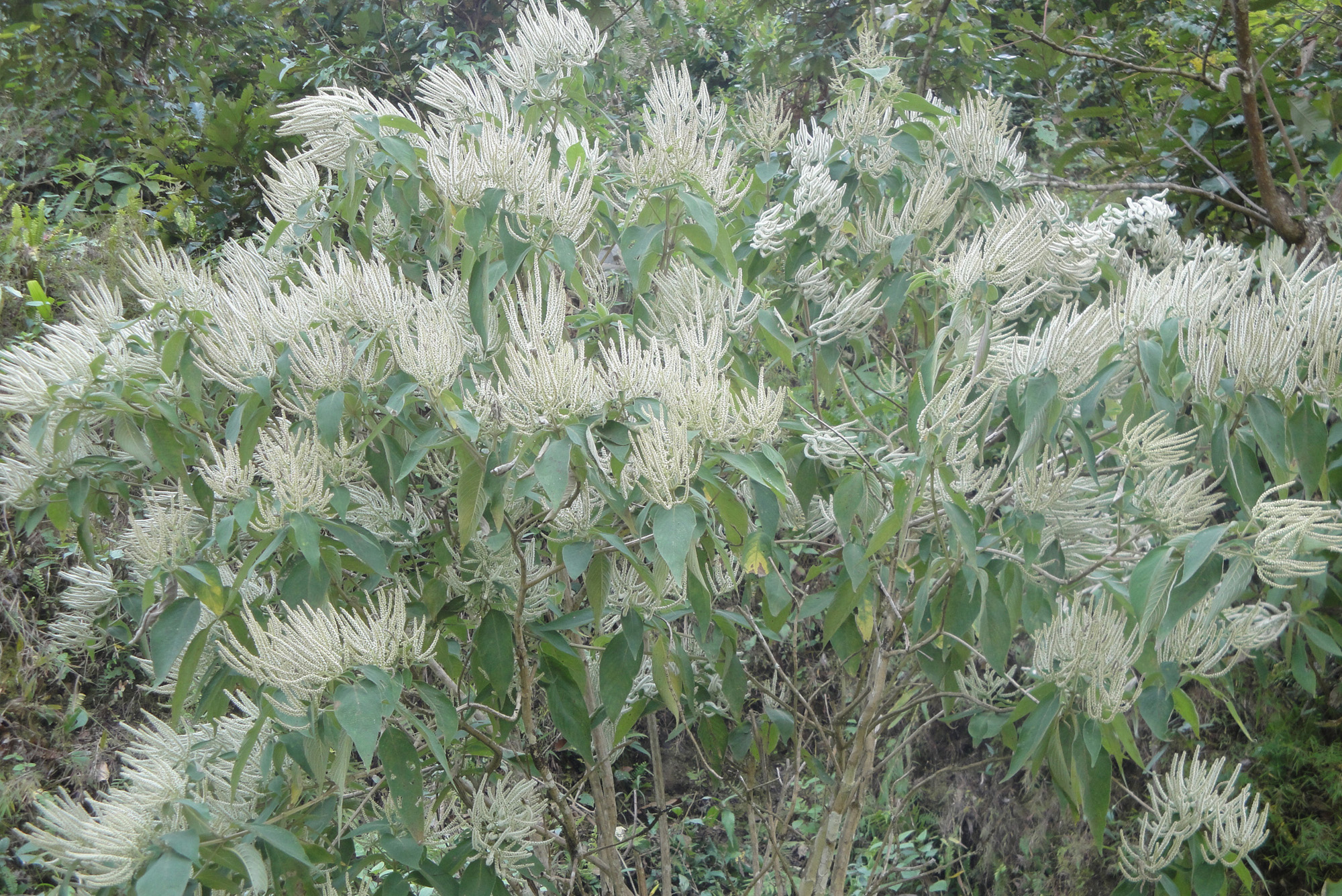

Scientific classification
- Kingdom: Plantae
- Clade: Tracheophytes
- Clade: Angiosperms
- Clade: Eudicots
- Clade: Asterids
- Order: Lamiales
- Family: Lamiaceae
- Subfamily: Lamioideae
- Genus: Colebrookea; Sm.
- Species: C. oppositifolia

Binomial name
- Colebrookea oppositifolia Sm.

Synonyms
- Buchanania Sm. 1806 not Spreng. 1802; Sussodia Buch.-Ham. ex D.Don; Elsholtzia oppositifolia (Sm.) Poir.; Sussodia oppositifolia (Sm.) Buch.-Ham.; Buchanania oppositifolia Sm.; Colebrookea ternifolia Roxb.

= Colebrookea =

Genus of flowering plants

Colebrookea is a genus of plants in the family Lamiaceae, first described in 1806. It contains only one known species, Colebrookea oppositifolia, native to India, Pakistan, Nepal, Bhutan, Assam, Bangladesh, Myanmar, Thailand and Yunnan.
