= Phlomidoschema =

Scientific classification
- Kingdom: Plantae
- Clade: Tracheophytes
- Clade: Angiosperms
- Clade: Eudicots
- Clade: Asterids
- Order: Lamiales
- Family: Lamiaceae
- Subfamily: Lamioideae
- Genus: Phlomidoschema (Benth.) Vved.
- Species: P. parviflorum

Binomial name
- Phlomidoschema parviflorum (Benth.) Vved.

Synonyms
- Stachys parviflora Benth.

Genus of flowering plants

Phlomidoschema is a genus of flowering plant in the family Lamiaceae, first described as a genus in 1941. It contains only one known species, Phlomidoschema parviflorum, native to south-central Asia and the northern part of the Indian subcontinent (Tajikistan, Afghanistan, Iran, Pakistan, western Himalayas, Punjab region in India).
