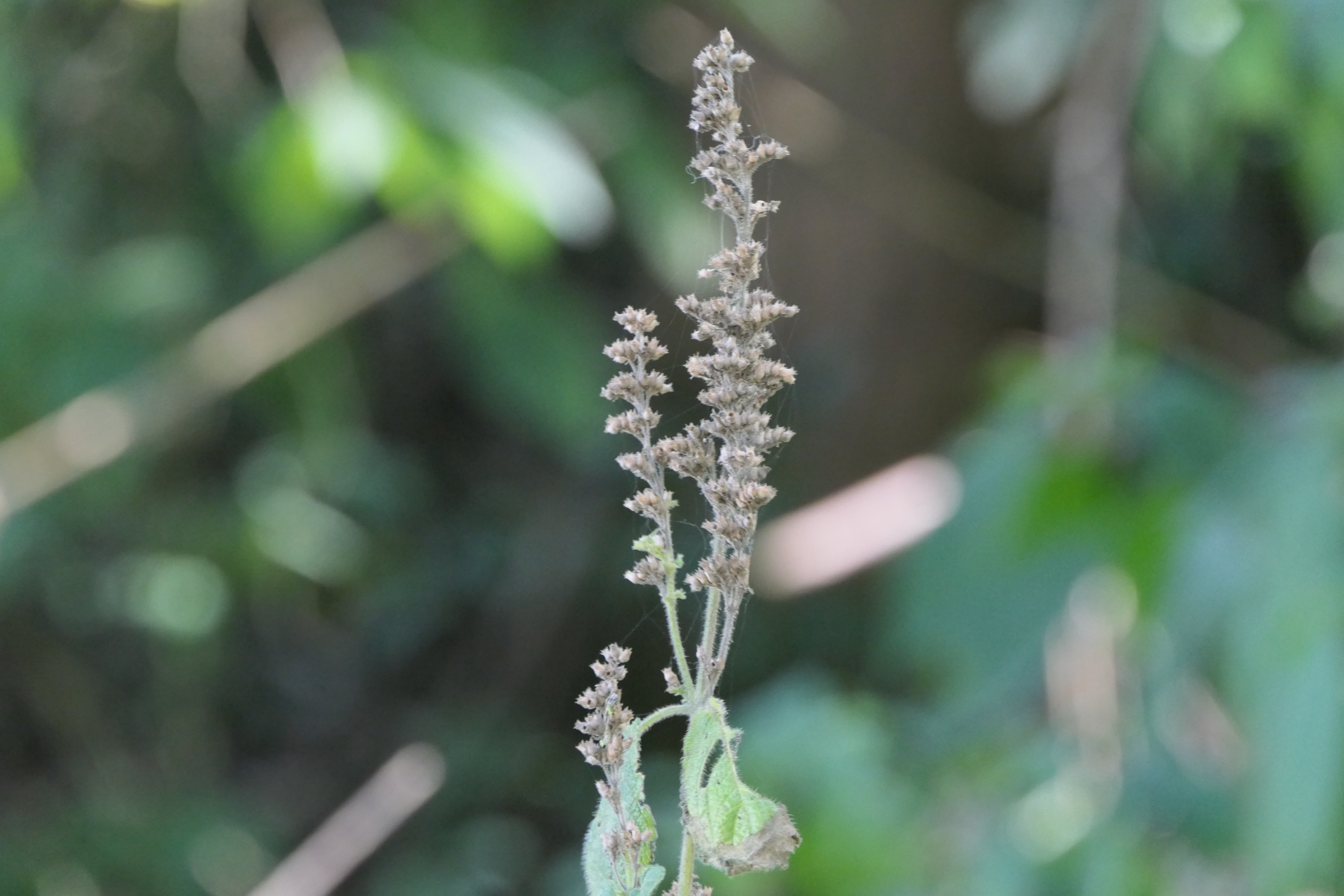

Scientific classification
- Kingdom: Plantae
- Clade: Tracheophytes
- Clade: Angiosperms
- Clade: Eudicots
- Clade: Asterids
- Order: Lamiales
- Family: Lamiaceae
- Subfamily: Lamioideae
- Genus: Craniotome; Rchb.
- Species: C. furcata

Binomial name
- Craniotome furcata (Link) Kuntze

Synonyms
- Ajuga furcata Link; Anisomeles furcata (Link) Loudon; Anisomeles nepalensis Spreng; Craniotome versicolor Rchb.; Nepeta versicolor Trevir.; Craniotome furcata var. sikkimensis D.Maity & Maiti; Craniotome furcata var. urceolata D.Maity & Maiti

= Craniotome furcata =

Species of flowering plant

Craniotome is a genus of plants in the mint family (Lamiaceae), first described in 1825. It contains only one known species, Craniotome furcata, native to Sichuan, Tibet, Yunnan, Sikkim, Bhutan, and The Himalayas of northern and eastern India, Laos, Myanmar, Nepal, and Vietnam.
