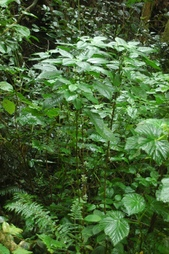

Scientific classification
- Kingdom: Plantae
- Clade: Tracheophytes
- Clade: Angiosperms
- Clade: Eudicots
- Clade: Asterids
- Order: Lamiales
- Family: Lamiaceae
- Subfamily: Lamioideae
- Tribe: Pogostemoneae
- Genus: Achyrospermum; Blume

= Achyrospermum =

Genus of flowering plants

Achyrospermum is a genus in the family Lamiaceae. It contains 23 species and can be found across Sub-Saharan Africa and Southeast Asia.

== Species ==
- Achyrospermum aethiopicum Welw.
- Achyrospermum africanum Hook.f. ex Baker
- Achyrospermum axillare E.A.Bruce
- Achyrospermum carvalhoi Gürke
- Achyrospermum ciliatum Gürke
- Achyrospermum cryptanthum Baker
- Achyrospermum dasytrichum Perkins
- Achyrospermum densiflorum Blume
- Achyrospermum erythobotrys Perkins
- Achyrospermum fruticosum Benth.
- Achyrospermum laterale Baker
- Achyrospermum micranthum Perkins
- Achyrospermum mildbraedii Perkins
- Achyrospermum oblongifolium Baker
- Achyrospermum parviflorum S.Moore
- Achyrospermum purpureum Phillipson
- Achyrospermum scandens Polhill
- Achyrospermum schimperi (Hochst. ex Briq.) Perkins
- Achyrospermum schlechteri Gürke
- Achyrospermum seychellarum Baker
- Achyrospermum tisserantii Letouzey
- Achyrospermum urens Baker
- Achyrospermum wallichianum (Benth.) Benth. ex Hook.f.
