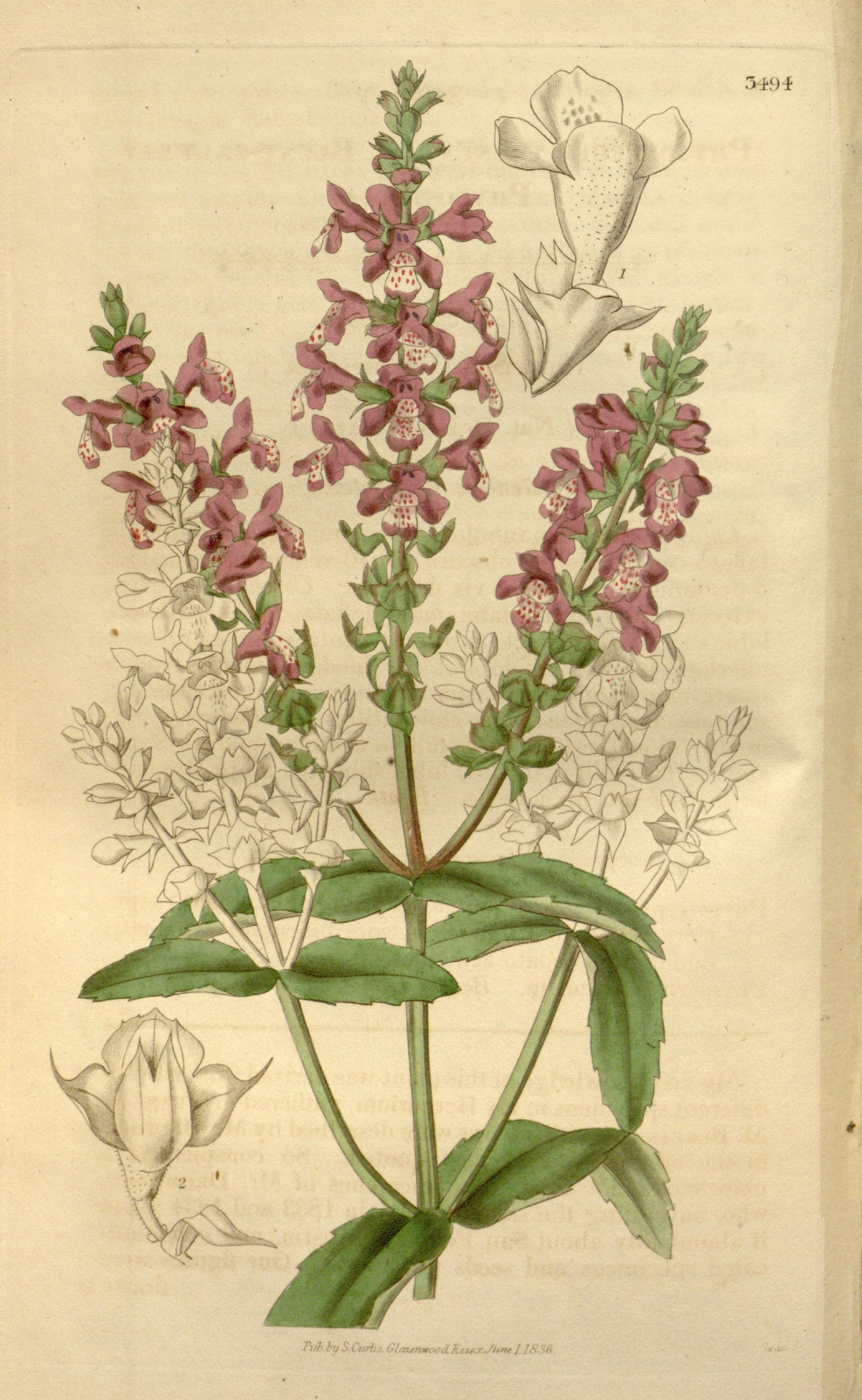
- Brazoria truncata

Scientific classification
- Kingdom: Plantae
- Clade: Tracheophytes
- Clade: Angiosperms
- Clade: Eudicots
- Clade: Asterids
- Order: Lamiales
- Family: Lamiaceae
- Subfamily: Lamioideae
- Genus: Brazoria; Engelm. & A.Gray

= Brazoria (plant) =

Genus of plants

Brazorion is a genus of plants in the family Lamiaceae, first described in 1845. It contains three known species, all endemic to the US state of Texas.

The name Brazoria refers to the Brazos River.

- Brazoria arenaria Lundell - southern Texas
- Brazoria enquistii M.W.Turner - central Texas
- Brazoria truncata (Benth.) Engelm. & A.Gray - south-central to east-central Texas

Formerly included:

- Brazoria scutellarioides Engelm. & A.Gray = Warnockia scutellarioides (Engelm. & A.Gray) M.W.Turner - Oklahoma, Texas, Coahuila
