= Lagopsis (plant) =

Scientific classification
- Kingdom: Plantae
- Clade: Tracheophytes
- Clade: Angiosperms
- Clade: Eudicots
- Clade: Asterids
- Order: Lamiales
- Family: Lamiaceae
- Subfamily: Lamioideae
- Genus: Lagopsis (Bunge ex Benth.) Bunge

Genus of flowering plants

Lagopsis is a genus of the mint family, first described in 1835. It is native to Siberia, China, Mongolia, and Central Asia.

Species

- Lagopsis darwiniana Pjak - Mongolia
- Lagopsis eriostachya (Benth.) Ikonn.-Gal. - Tuva, Irkutsk, Mongolia, Xinjiang, Qinghai
- Lagopsis flava Kar. & Kir. - Xinjiang, Kazakhstan, Kyrgyzstan
- Lagopsis marrubiastrum (Stephan) Ikonn.-Gal. - Altai Republic in Siberia, Ladakh Range of Tibet and Kashmir
- Lagopsis supina (Steph. ex Willd.) Ikonn.-Gal. - China, Mongolia, Siberia
