= Hau (surname) =

Hau is a surname. It may be a variant spelling of the Chinese surname Hao 郝, the Cantonese spelling of the Chinese surname Hou 侯, or it could be a Chinese surname like 豪 or 好、昊、皓、浩, etc. Or a Danish surname. It is also an indigenous mayan last name [Hau] from the southeast area of Mexico, Guatemala and Belice.

Notable individuals with the surname Hau include:

- Alyson Hau (born 1983), Hong Kong radio DJ
- Brian Hau (born 1982), Hong Kong singer-songwriter and author
- Carl Hau (1881–1926), German lawyer and murderer
- Caroline Hau (born 1969), Chinese-Filipino author and academic
- Hau Chi-keung (born 1956), Hong Kong businessman
- Eduard Hau (1807–1888), German painter and graphic artist
- Gretchen Hau, Puerto Rican politician and lawyer
- Johannes Hau (1771–1838), German painter
- Lene Hau (born 1959), Danish physicist
- Hau Lung-pin (born 1952), Taiwanese politician, Mayor of Taipei
- Hau Man-kin (born 1992), Hong Kong activist and politician
- Hau Pei-tsun (1919–2020), Chinese politician and military officer, Premier of the Republic of China
- Hau Shui-pui (born 1924), Hong Kong politician
- Hau Yung Sang (born 1917), Chinese-Taiwanese footballer
- Woldemar Hau (1816–1895), German painter

== See also ==
- Hau Latukefu (born 1976), Australian musician and radio host known as Hau
- Tuku Hau Tapuha (born 2001), New Zealand rugby league footballer
- Matt Te Hau (1912–1978), New Zealand Māori community leader
- Hao (surname)
- Hou (surname)
