= Friedrich Karl Hermann Kruse =

German historian (1790–1866)

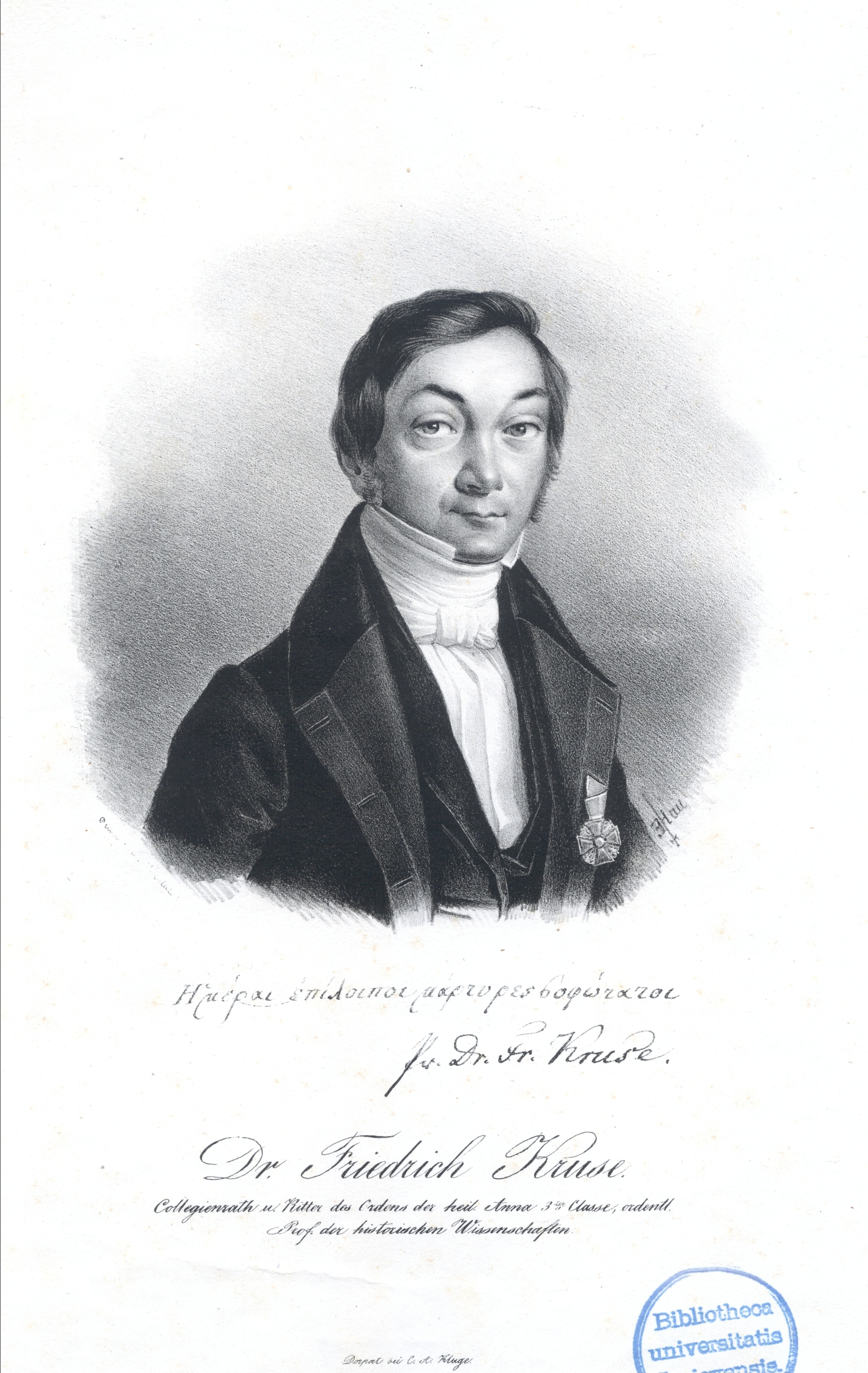
Lithograph by Eduard Hau, 1839

Friedrich Karl Hermann Kruse (21 July 1790 – 3 August 1866) was a German historian born in Oldenburg.

In 1813 he obtained his doctorate from the University of Leipzig. Beginning in 1816 he taught classes at Maria Magdalena Gymnasium in Breslau, and in 1821 was appointed professor of ancient and medieval history and geography at the University of Halle. From 1828 to 1853 he was a professor at the Imperial University of Dorpat.

== Written works ==
Among his better known writings were Budorgis, oder das alte Schlesien vor der Einführung der christlichen Religion (Budorgis, or Ancient Silesia before the Introduction of the Christian Religion, 1819) and Deutsche Altertümer (German Antiquities, 1824–29, three volumes). Other noted works by Kruse include:

- De Istri ostiis, 1820
- Hellas, oder geographisch-antiquarische Darstellung des alten Griechenland (Hellas, or Geographical-Antique Representation of Ancient Greece); 1825–27, three volumes
- Anastasis der Waräger, 1841
- Nekrolivonika, oder Altertümer von Liv-, Esth- und Kurland ("Nekrolivonika", or Antiquities of Livonia, Estonia and Kurland), 1842
- Russische Altertümer (Russian Antiquities), 1844–45
- Urgeschichte der Ostseeprovinzen (Prehistory of the Baltic Sea Provinces), 1846
- Chronicon Nortmannorum, 1851
