= Johannes Hau =

Baltic-German landscape painter

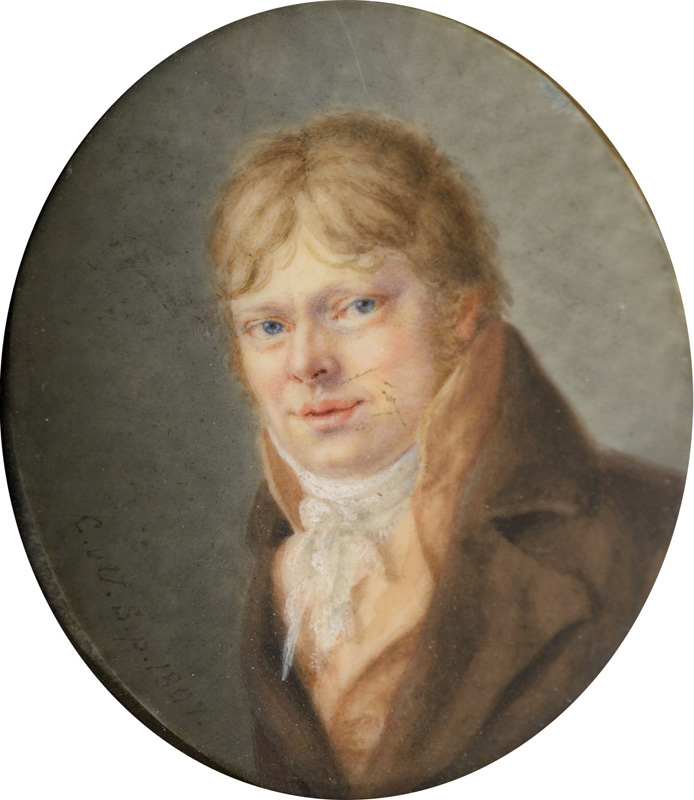
Johannes Hau; portrait by Karl Johann Emanuel von Ungern-Sternberg (1807)

Johannes Hau (17 April 1771, Flensburg, Duchy of Schleswig – 3 August 1838, Reval) was a Baltic-German landscape painter.

== Life and work ==
His father, Jens Petersen Hau, was a ship's captain. In 1795, he left his hometown in the Duchy of Schleswig (which was part of Denmark) and moved to Reval in the Russian Empire. There, he became a master painter and by 1806, he was serving as an Ältermann (a type of administrative official) with the Canute Guild. From 1818 until his death, he was the guild's chairman.

He is best remembered for his small-scale vedute of Reval and Narva done in gouache. These were very popular with upper-class people from St. Petersburg, who came to visit the city's spas. In 1823, he organized an exhibition at his home, which was one of the first solo exhibitions of any type held in Reval.

He was interred at the Kopli cemetery, which was destroyed in the 1940s, during the second Soviet occupation of the Baltic states.

His two sons, Eduard and Woldemar Hau, also became well known painters.

== Views of Reval (Tallinn) ==
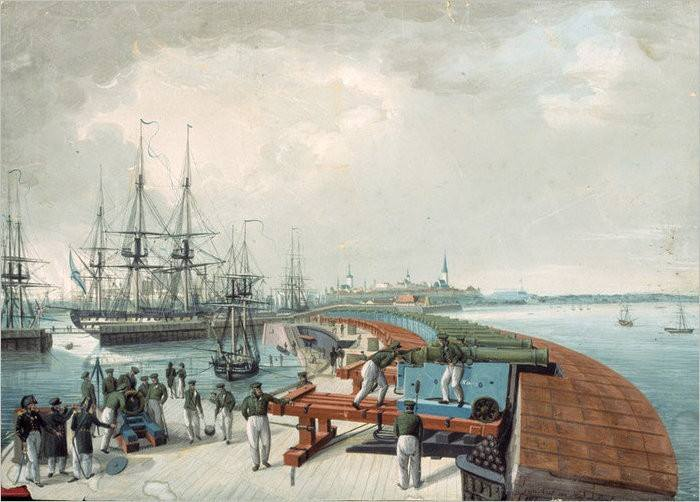
Russian Coast Artillery in the Harbor

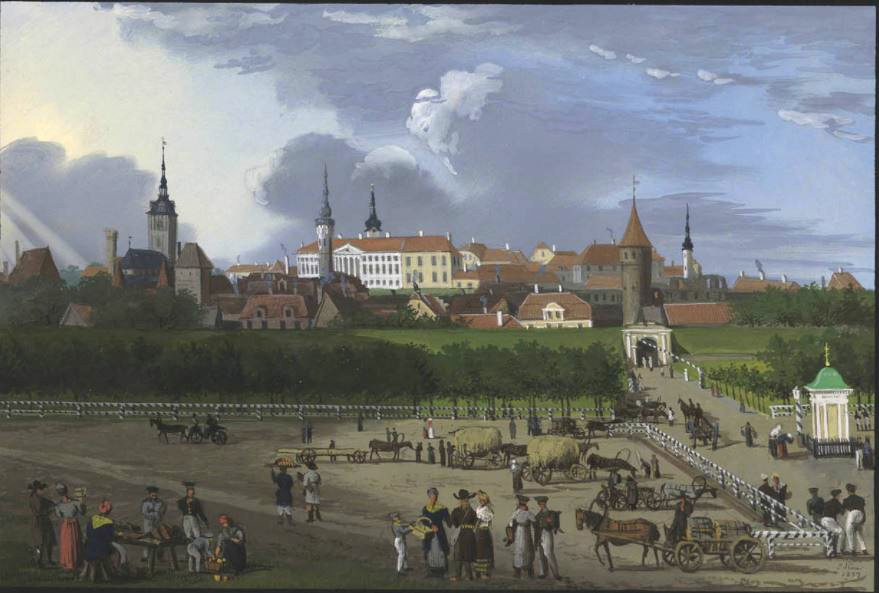
View of Reval from the Northeast

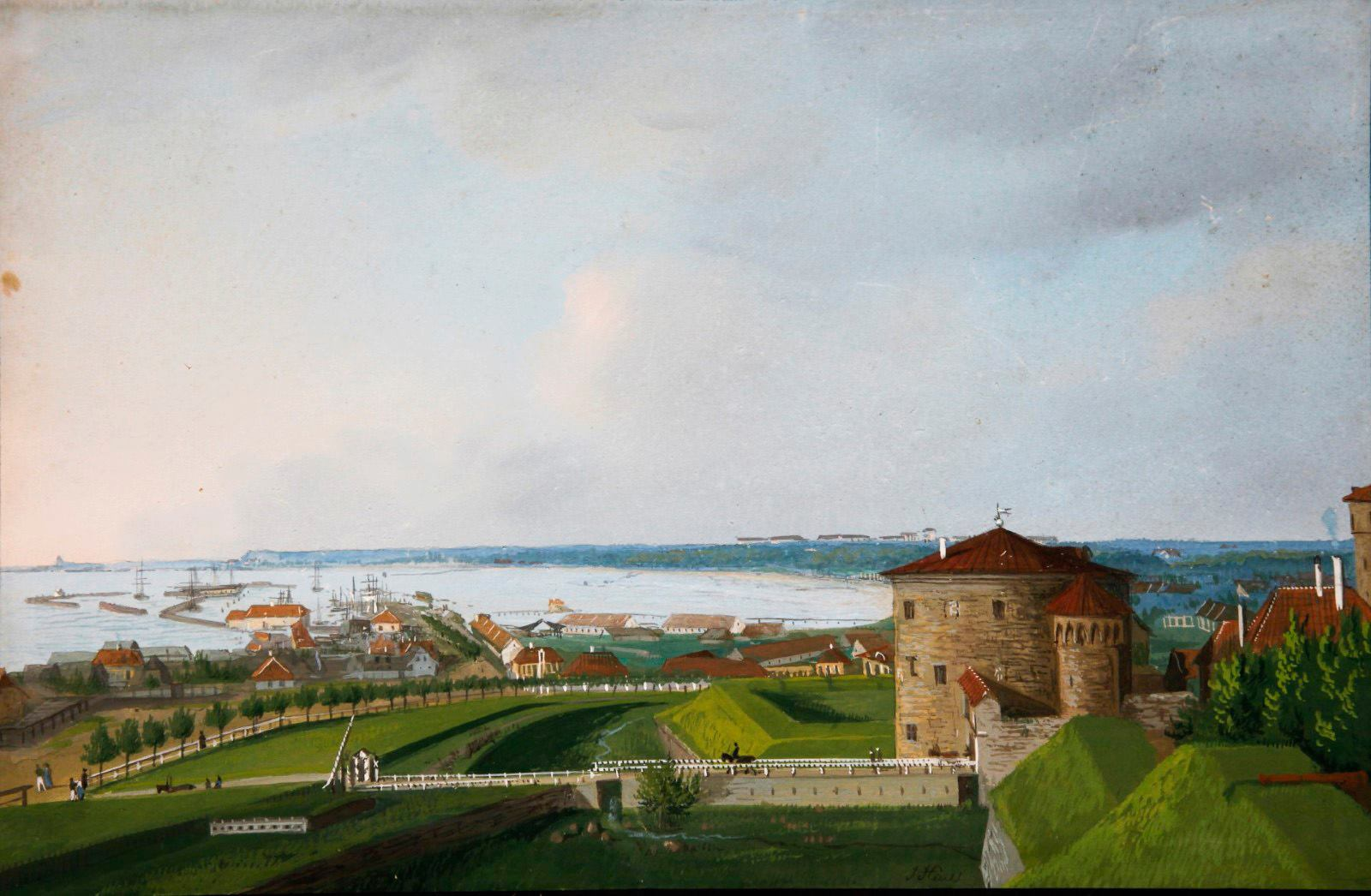
View of the Great Coastal Gate
