= Woldemar Hau =

Russian painter (1816–1895)

- Владимир Гау
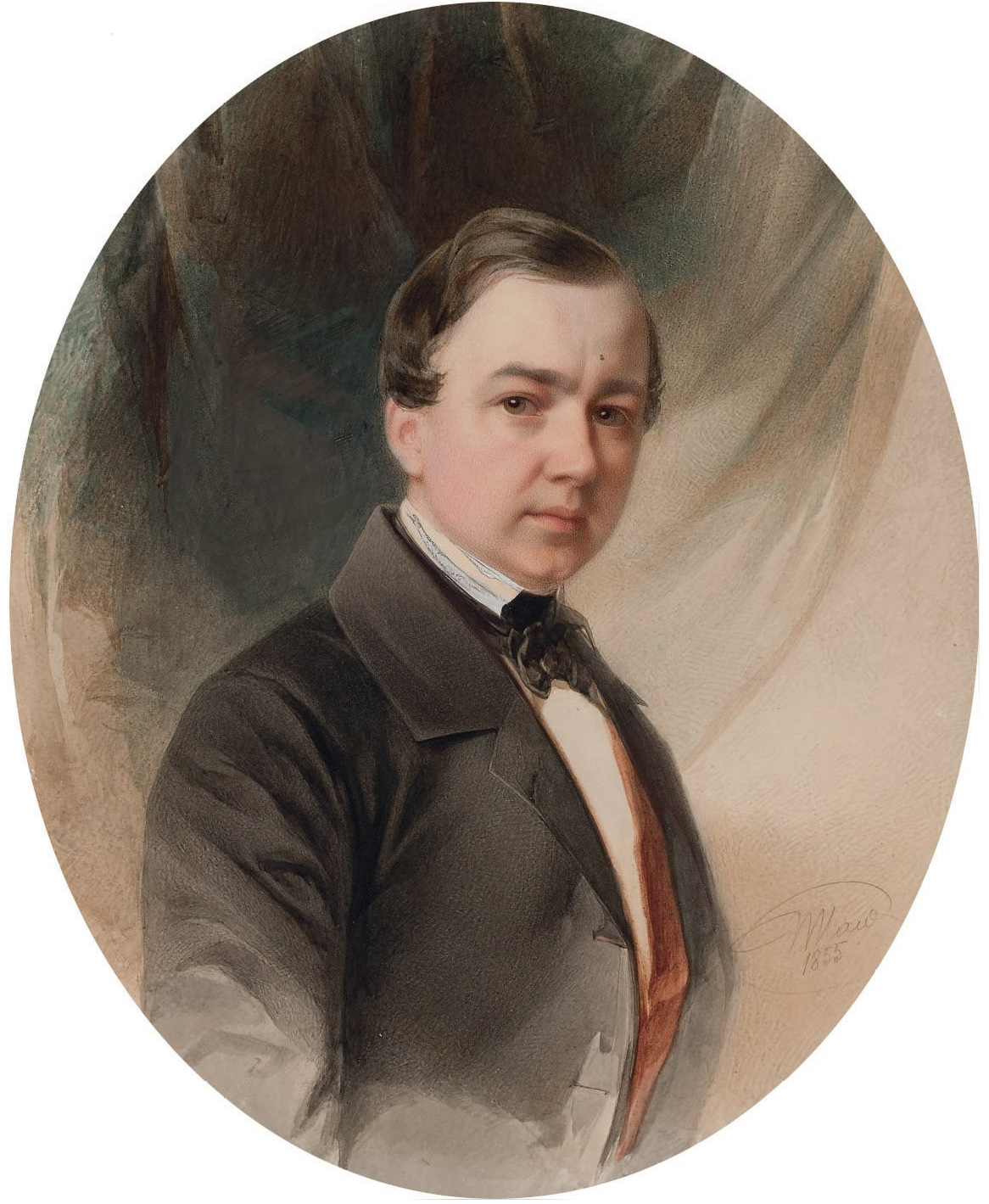
- Self-portrait, 1855
- Born: February 4, 1816; Reval, Russian Empire
- Died: March 11, 1895 (aged 79); Saint Petersburg, Russian Empire
- Resting place: Smolensky Lutheran Cemetery, Saint Petersburg
- Education: Member Academy of Arts (1849)
- Alma mater: Imperial Academy of Arts (1836)
- Known for: Watercolor painting
- Spouse: Louise Sanftleben (m. 1842)

Woldemar Hau (Russian: Влади́мир Ива́нович Га́у, romanized: Vladimir Ivanovich Gau; 14 February [O.S. 4 February] 1816 – 23 March [O.S. 11 March] 1895) was a Baltic German painter, active in St. Petersburg during Tsar Nicholas I's reign. The younger half-brother to fellow artisan Eduard Hau, he was best known for his watercolor portraits of the Russian imperial family and nobility, typical of the Biedermeier style.

== Life and work ==
He was the son of painter Johannes Hau, who had emigrated from Northern Germany in 1795, and he grew up in the German community of Reval (now Tallinn, Estonia). His half-brother was the painter Eduard Hau. In addition to his father, he studied with the former court painter Karl von Kügelgen.

At the age of 16, he was offered an opportunity to paint the grand duchesses and received a letter of recommendation to Alexander Sauerweid, a professor at the Imperial Academy of Arts. From 1833 to 1835, he was a "guest student" at the Academy. He worked as a freelance painter for three years, then travelled extensively throughout Italy and Germany for two years. On his return, he was named court painter, spending the next three decades painting the imperial family and their associates. He was appointed a member of the Academy in 1849.

Among his most famous works are his portraits of Tsar Nicholas I and Tsarina Alexandra Fyodorovna. He eventually painted all the members of the imperial family as well as many familiar figures in Russian and Baltic German society, such as Ferdinand Johann Wiedemann and Natalia Pushkina. He also produced 200 miniature portraits of veterans of the Izmaylovsky Regiment. He died on 23 March 1895 in Saint Petersburg.

== Selected portraits ==
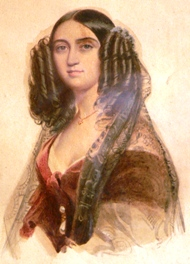
Countess Yuliya Samoylova (1840)

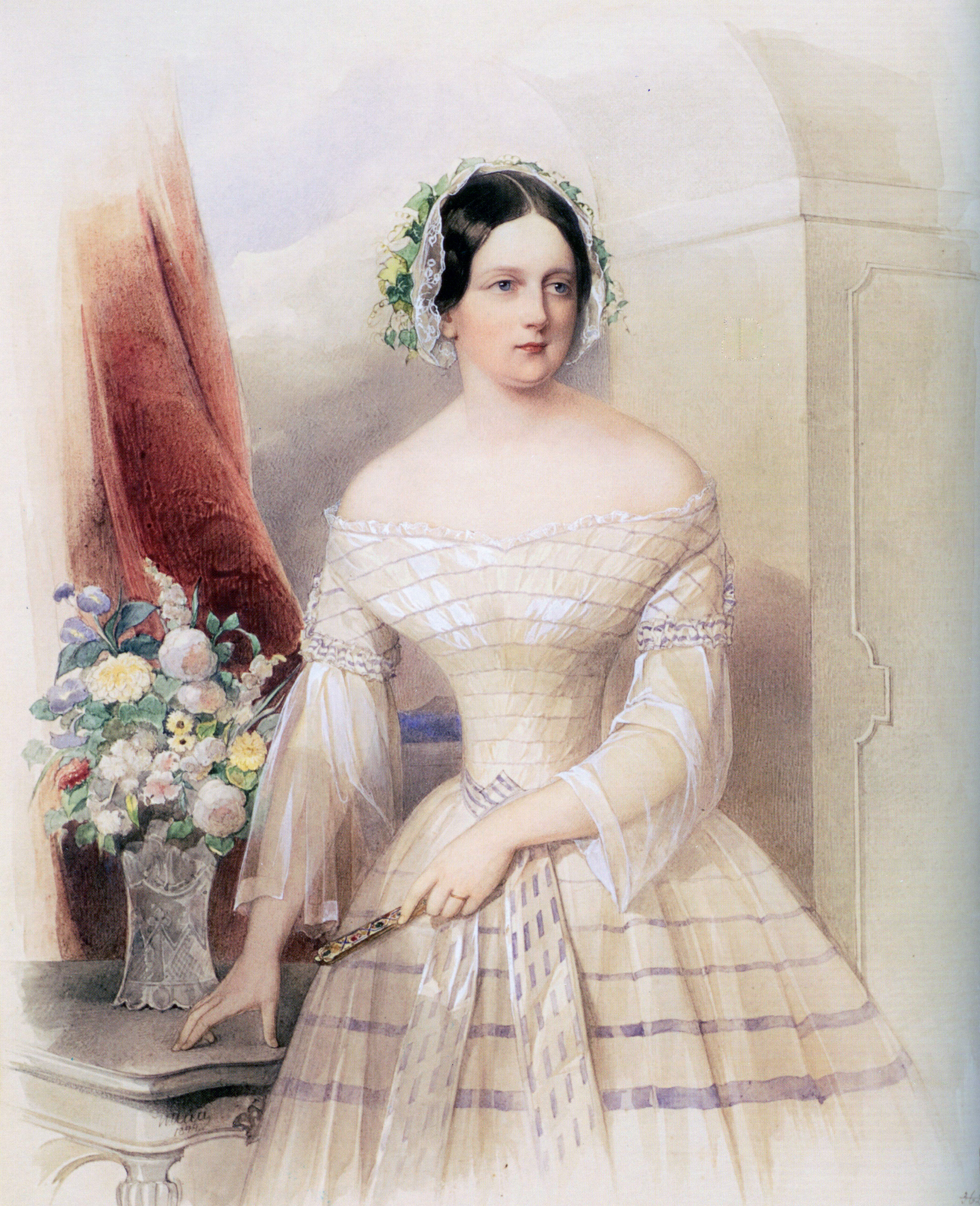
Grand Duchess Elizabeth Mikhailovna of Russia (1844)

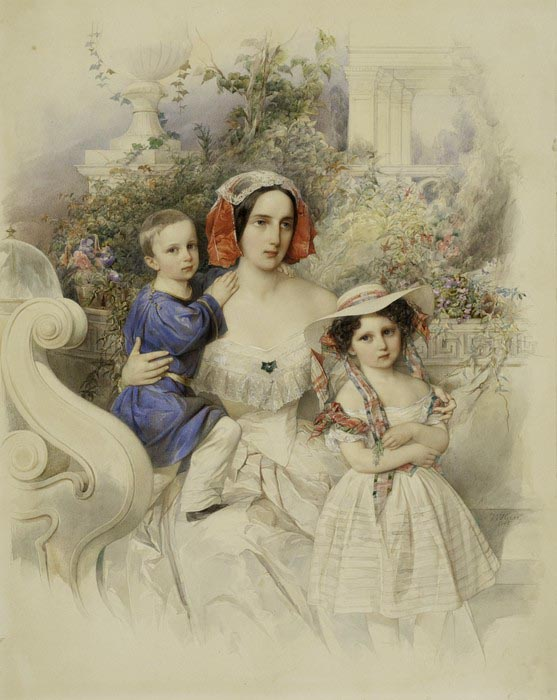
Grand Duchess Maria Nikolaevna and Her Children (1845)

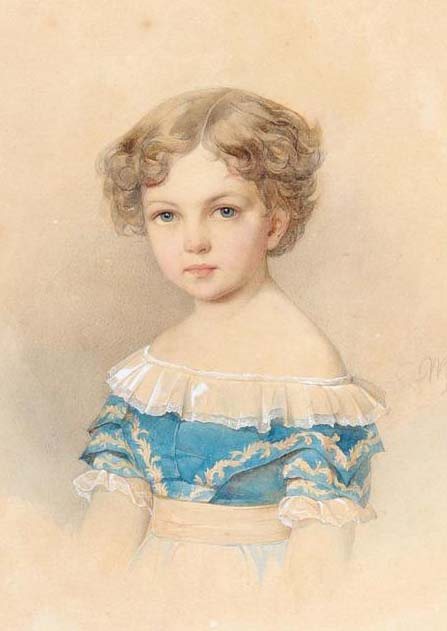
Grand Duchess Alexandra Alexandrovna of Russia (1845)

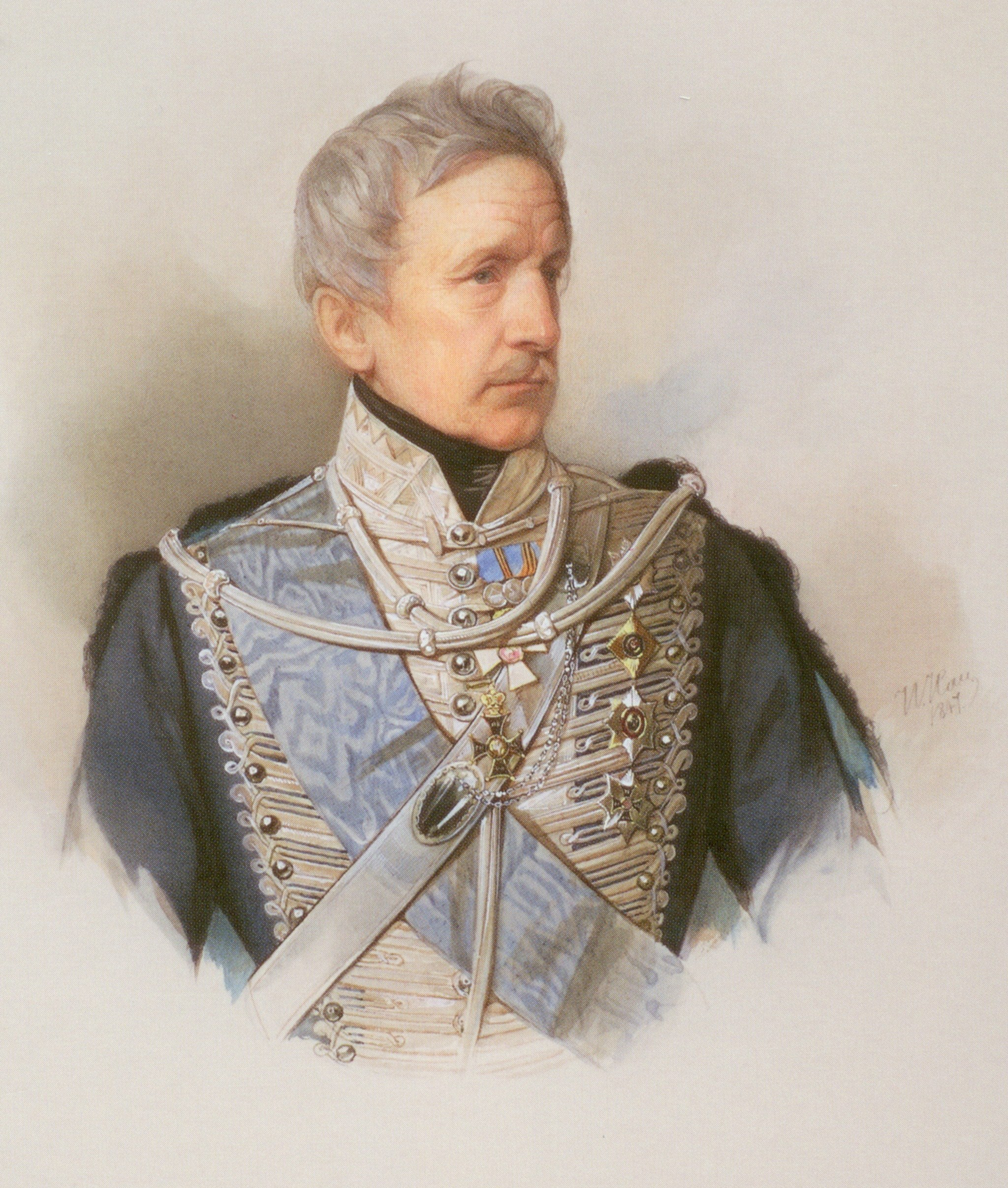
Peter von der Pahlen (1847)

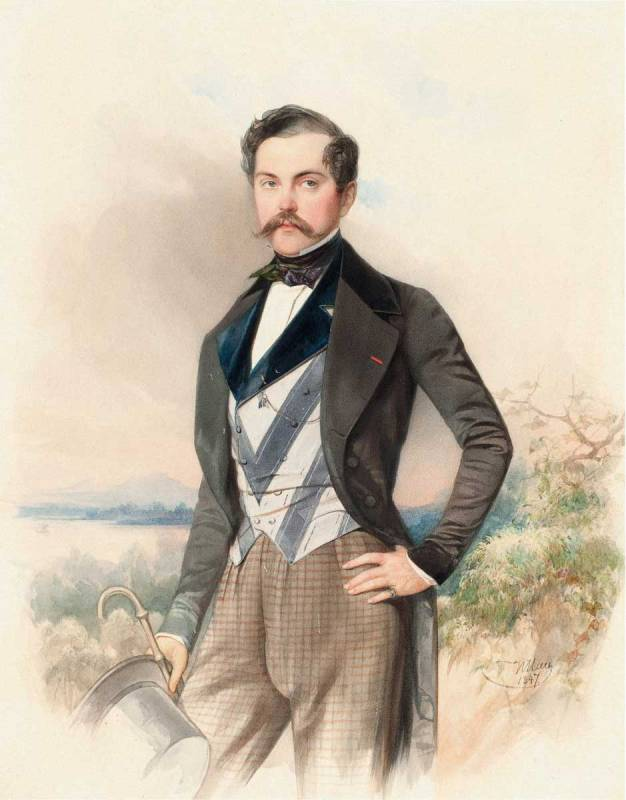
Count Nikolay Adlerberg (1847)

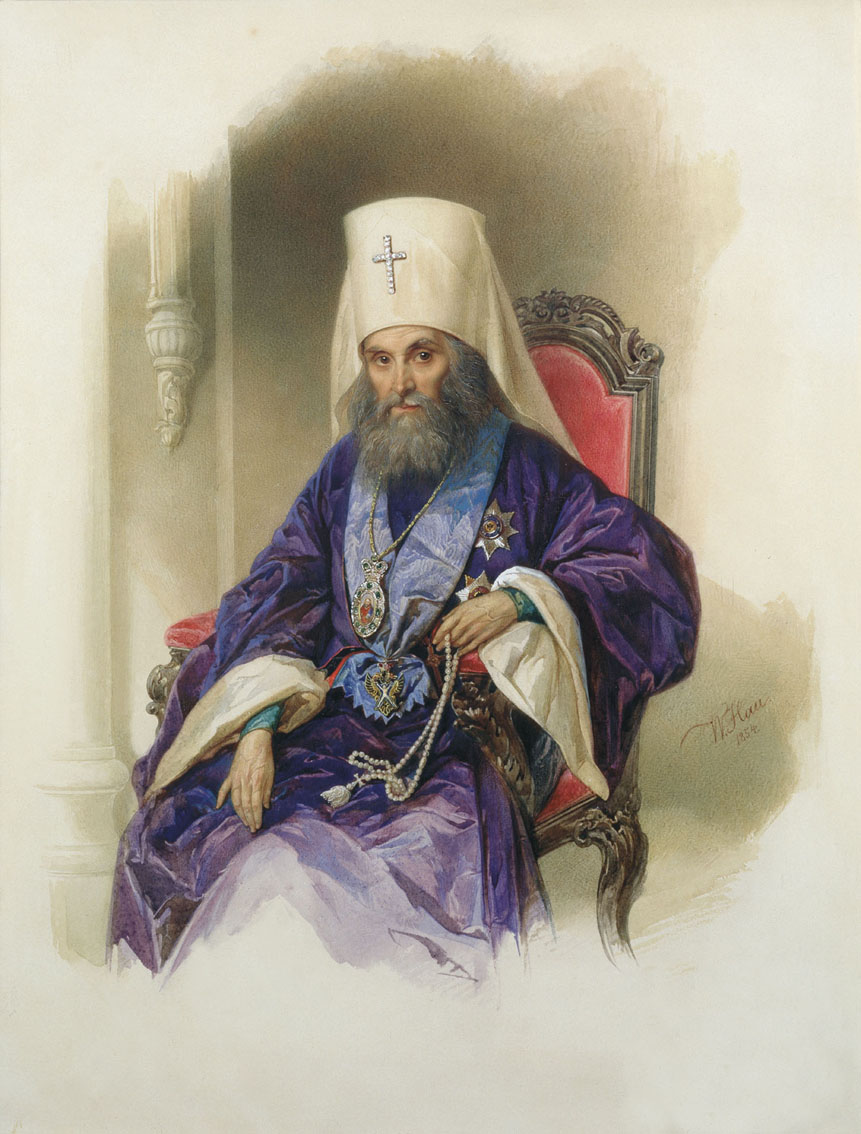
Filaret, Metropolitan of Moscow (1854)
