= Brian Hau =

Hong Kong graphic designer, singer songwriter, author

Brian Hau (born 15 July 1982, Hong Kong) is a singer-songwriter, graphic designer, columnist, book author, and occasional cartoon artist based in Hong Kong. Hau's quirky style has earned him growing recognition in the singer-songwriter scene in Hong Kong.

Music

Hau's songs are a unique combination of demos and improvised lyrics. Currently, he has released two albums named Definition (2006) and I'm Fat But I'm Happy (2008). According to Hau on his 2008 EP I'm Fat But I'm Happy, “At first, I wanted to name it I’m Imperfect But I’m Happy, but then I thought I’m Fat But I’m Happy is funnier and more direct. It stems from my realization that it’s perfectly fine not to be perfect, and it’s indeed these flaws that make Brian Hau unique."

Born in Hong Kong and raised in Canada, the independent musician has a Bachelor of Design degree from the University of Alberta. He came home to embark on a career in one of the world’s most baffling music industries.

"My music is influenced by Cantopop, which I listened to in my younger days," says Hau. "But when I went to Canada I listened to radio there, and so there’s kind of a blend." Hau’s influences include the likes of Matchbox 20 and Alanis Morissette, and semi-obscure Canadian bands Our Lady Peace and Moist.

Writing

In 2010, Hau started to write columns for Mingpao. He later gathered these articles together with poetry, cartoons and photos he created into a book named "Hick and the City" in 2011. Hau published his second book "Gain and Loss" in 2014.

Hau's third book "Ladder" was published in 2017, it contains personal essays that cover his journey in climbing the 'ladder to success' and his recovery journey from Bipolar Affective Disorder.
