= Eduard Hau =

Baltic German painter and graphic artist (1807–1888)

- Эдуард Гау
- Born: 28 July 1807; Reval, Russian Empire
- Died: January 3, 1888 (aged 80); Dorpat, Governorate of Livonia, Russian Empire
- Known for: Interior portrait paintings

Eduard Hau, sometimes erranously "Gau" (Russian: Эдуа́рд Петро́вич Га́у; 28 July 1807 in Reval, Russian Empire – 3 January 1888 in Dorpat or c. 1887 in Saint-Petersburg) was a Baltic German painter and draughtsman, best known for his interior portraits of the Russian imperial residences.

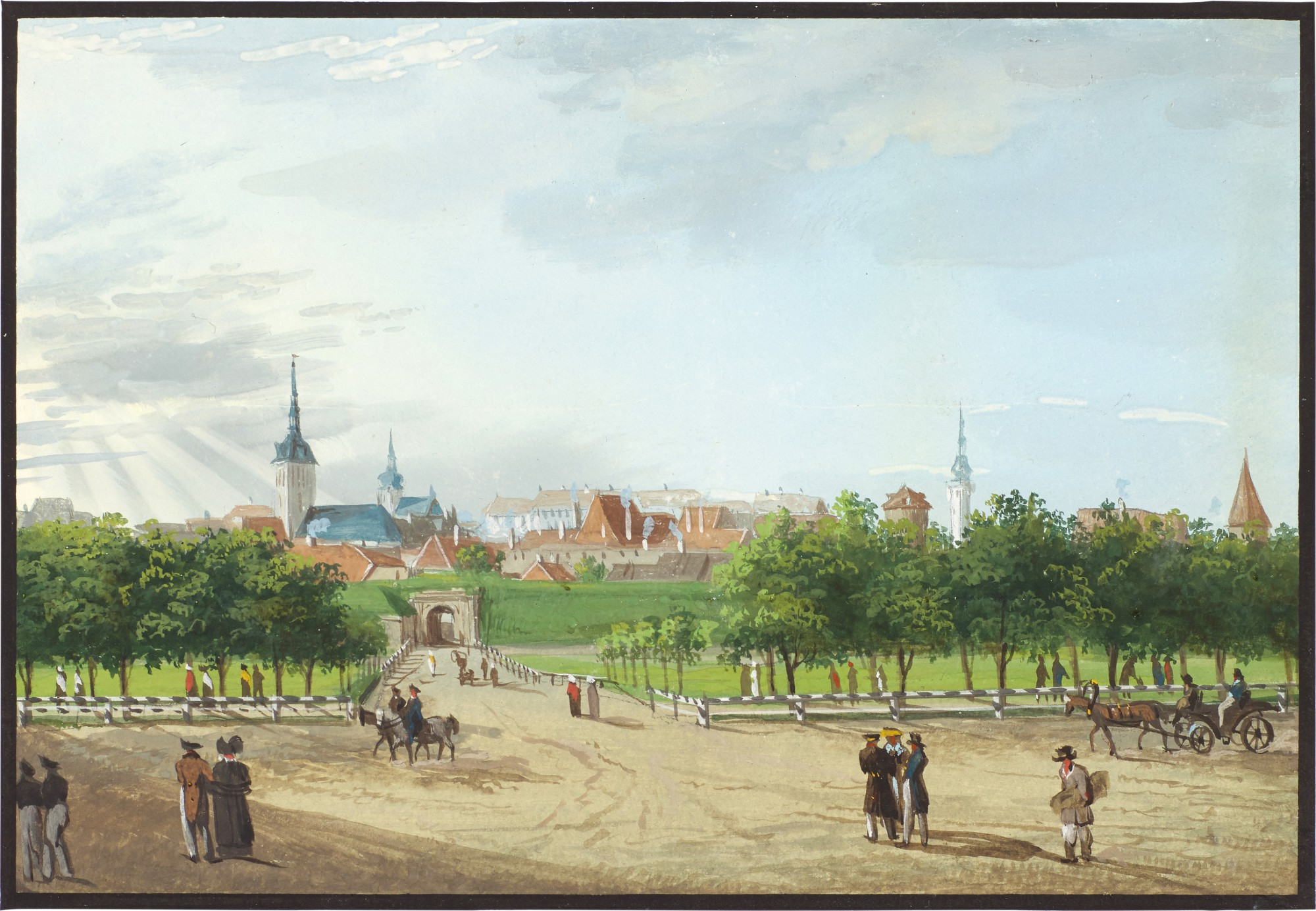
A view in Estonia by Eduard Petrovich Hau.

== Life and work ==
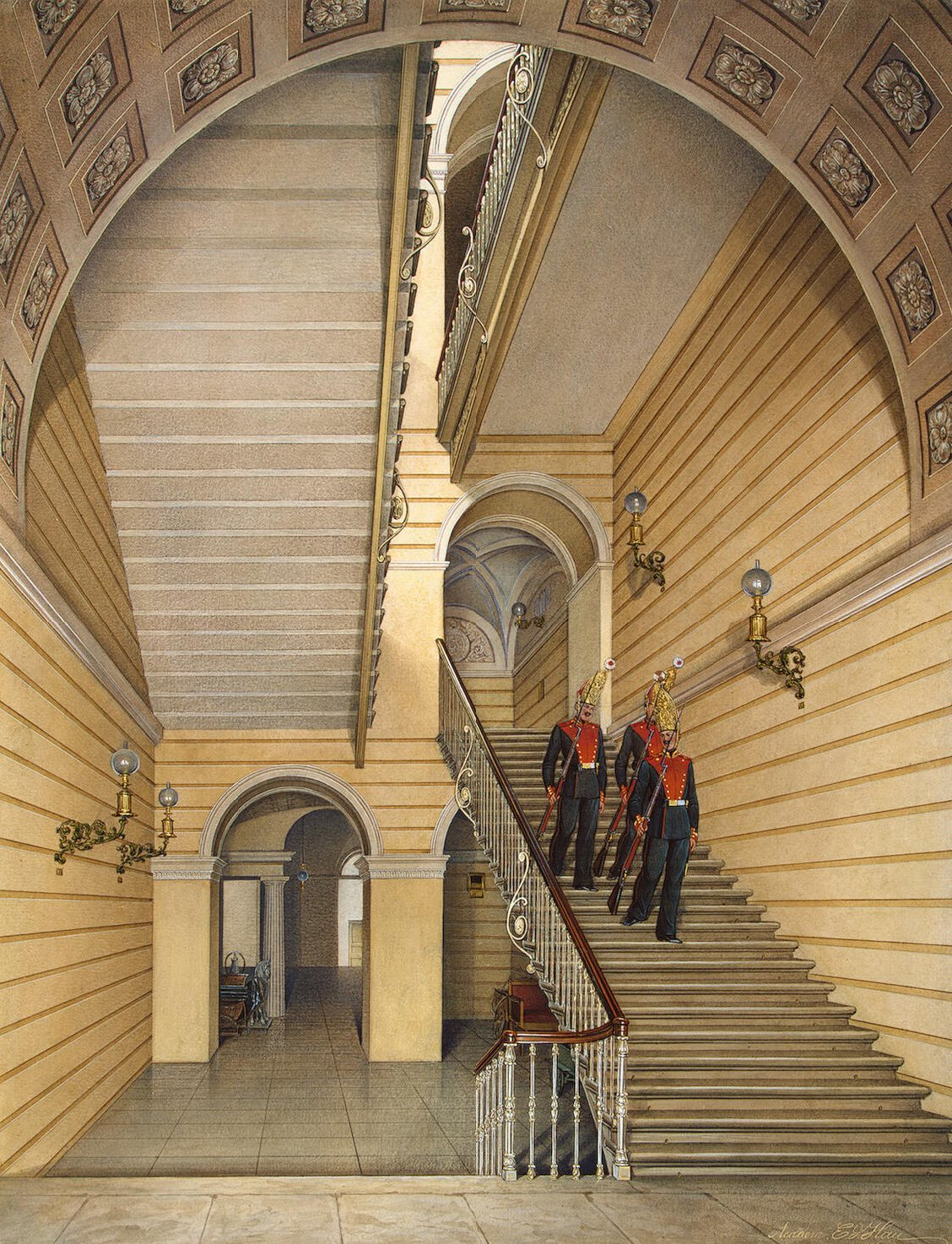
Church staircase in the Winter Palace (1869)

He was the son of painter Johannes Hau, who had emigrated from Northern Germany in 1795, and he grew up in the German community of Tallinn ("Reval" in German). His mother was Annette Juliane, née Nielsen. His half-brother was the painter Woldemar Hau. From 1830 to 1832, he studied at the Dresden Academy of Fine Arts. He was married to Nelly Strieker, from Altenburg.

From 1836 to 1839, he lived in Tartu ("Dorpat"), where he also spent the last years of his life. In between, he apparently lived in Saint Petersburg, where he produced numerous, very detailed interior portraits of rooms in the Winter Palace, the Peterhof Palace and other Royal residences e.g. The Cottage Palace in Alexandria village near Peterhof. His major works include: "The Main Staircase in the Hermitage" (1853), "Perspective View of the Hall of the Russian School in the Imperial Hermitage" (1855), "Cabinet of the Italian Schools" (1860), "Hall of the Coat of Arms" (1863), "Hall of the Field Marshal" (1866).

In Moscow, Eduard Hau painted the interiors of the Grand Kremlin Palace and the Nicholas Palace; in St. Petersburg, he painted the Mikhailovsky Castle, and in Khatsina, he painted the interiors of the Great Gatchina Palace. Hau's works are characterized by a jeweler-like precision in depicting the smallest details, which is difficult to achieve in watercolor painting.

He was on the membership list at the Imperial Academy of Arts in 1854, and probably remained in Russia until c. 1880. He also painted several portraits: "Two Girls" (late 1830s), "Portrait of a Woman" (Vera Arkadyevna Stolypina, early 1840s) and "Yulia Mikhailovna Greig".

The Great Gatchina Palace was burned by retreating German troops during World War II in 1944. When it was rebuilt, the interior was restored using Hau's 59 paintings from 1870's to 1880 as a guide.

Outside of Russia, he is primarily known for his portraits of the Professors at the Imperial University of Dorpat. They appeared from 1837 to 1839 and were distributed in a series of lithographs, in six issues, by the firm of Georg Friedrich Schlater. The portrait subjects included Friedrich Karl Hermann Kruse, Nikolay Pirogov and Friedrich Georg Wilhelm Struve. He also produced well-known portraits of Friedrich Robert Faehlmann (1837, lithograph) and Johann Carl Simon Morgenstern (1838, oil painting).

== Portraits ==
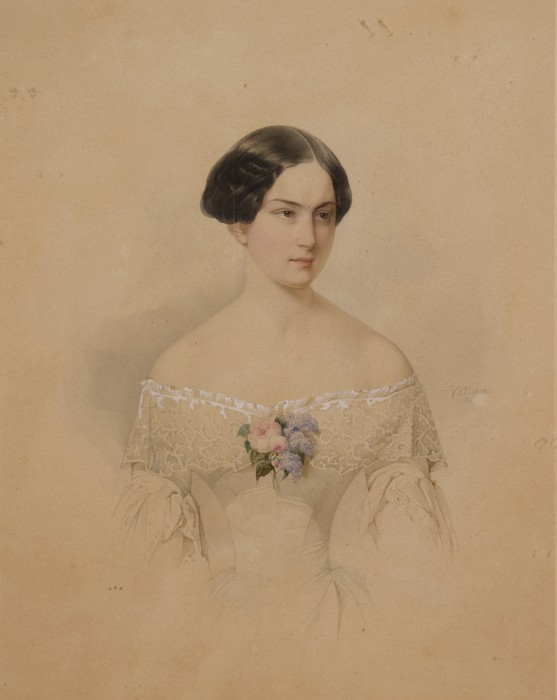
Portrait of Vera Arkadyevna Golitsyna, née Stolypin (1821–1853), 1846.

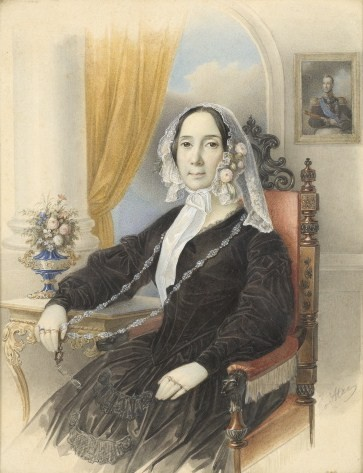
Portrait of Yulia Mikhailovna Greig, née Stalinskaya (1800–1881), 1850.

== Selected lithographs of the professors ==
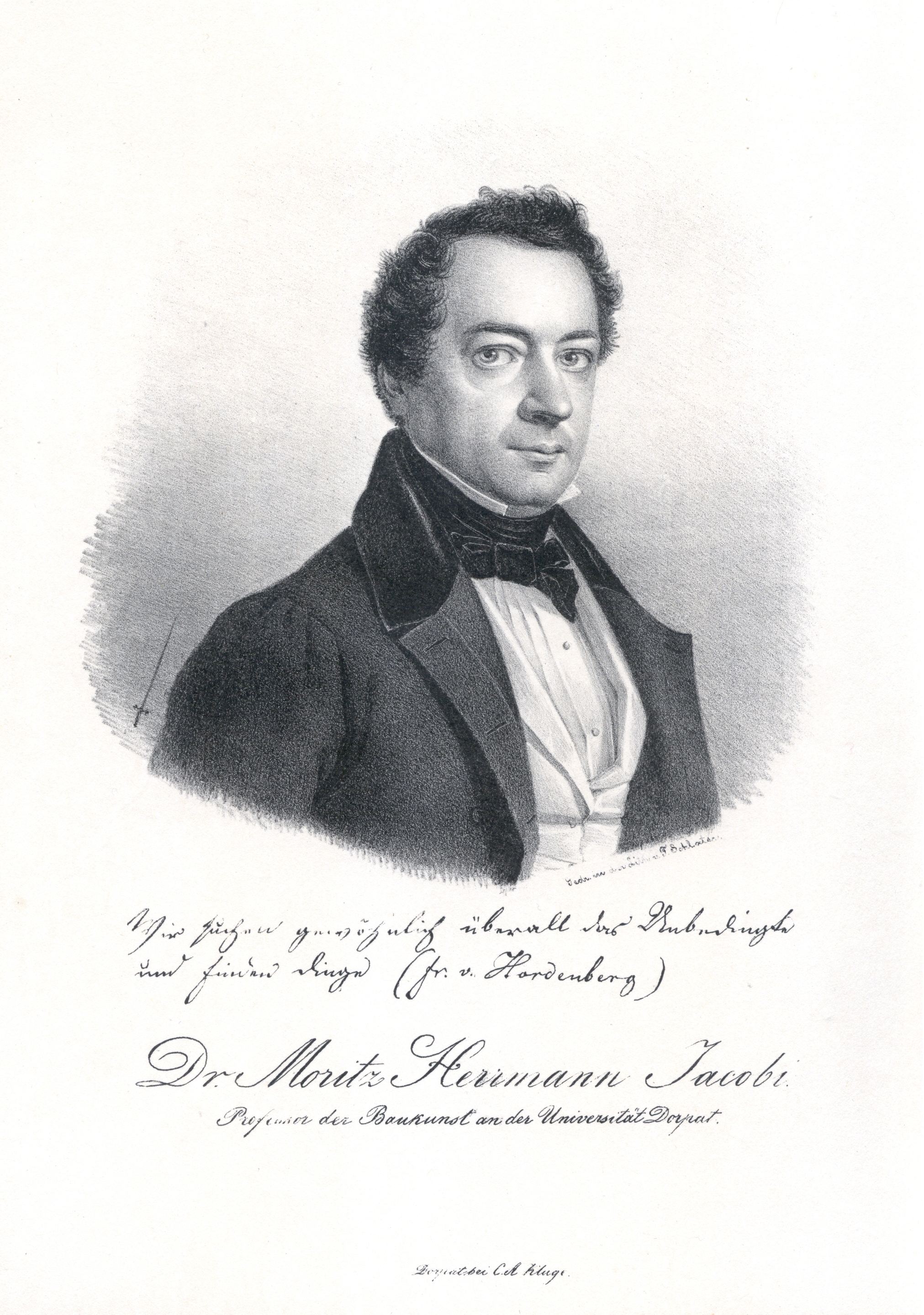
Moritz von Jacobi

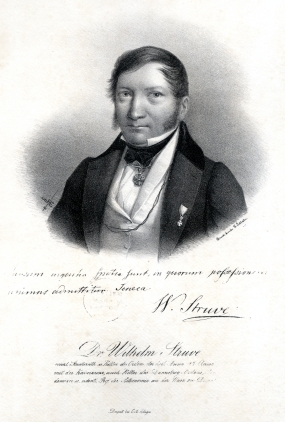
Wilhelm Struve

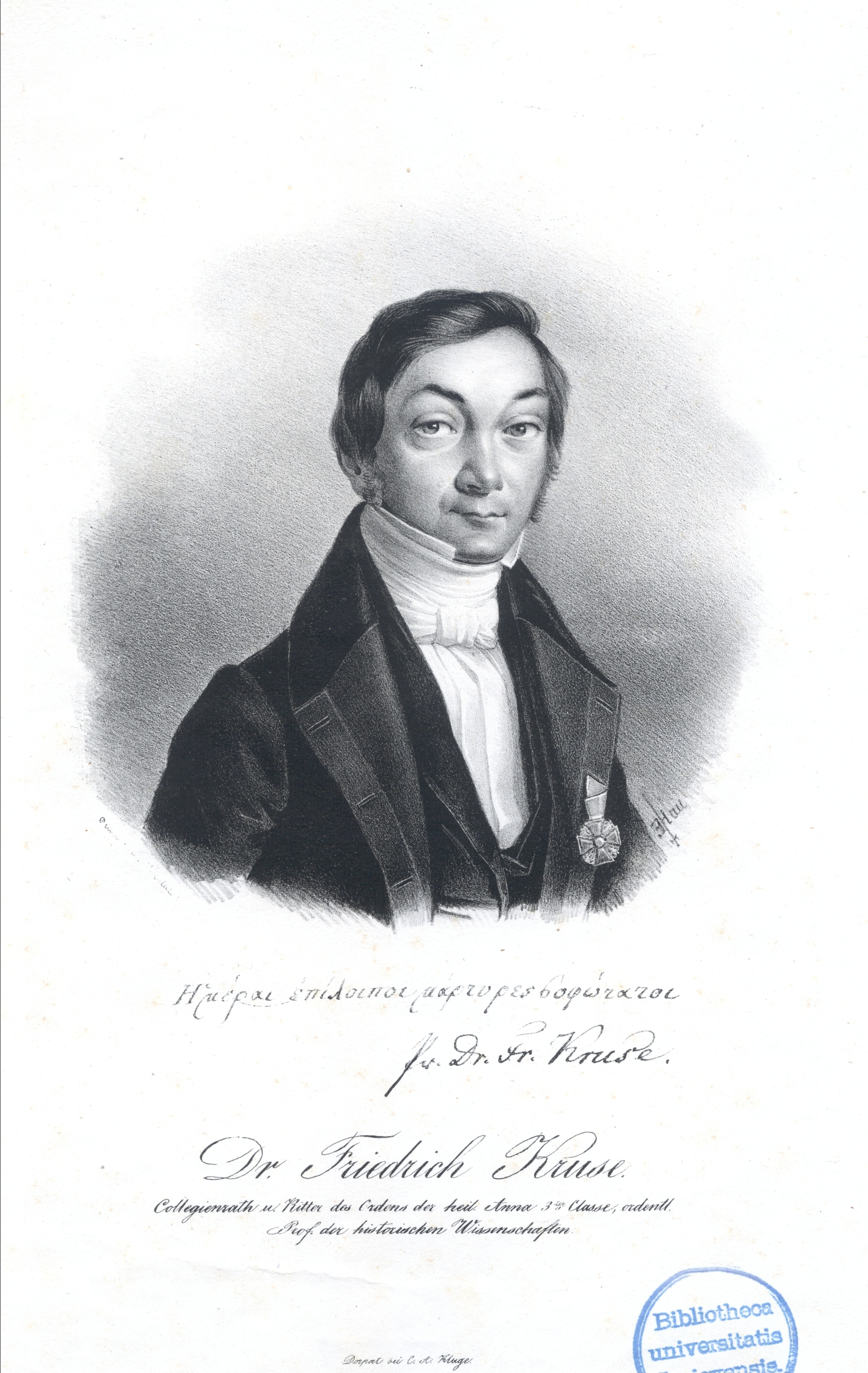
Friedrich Kruse

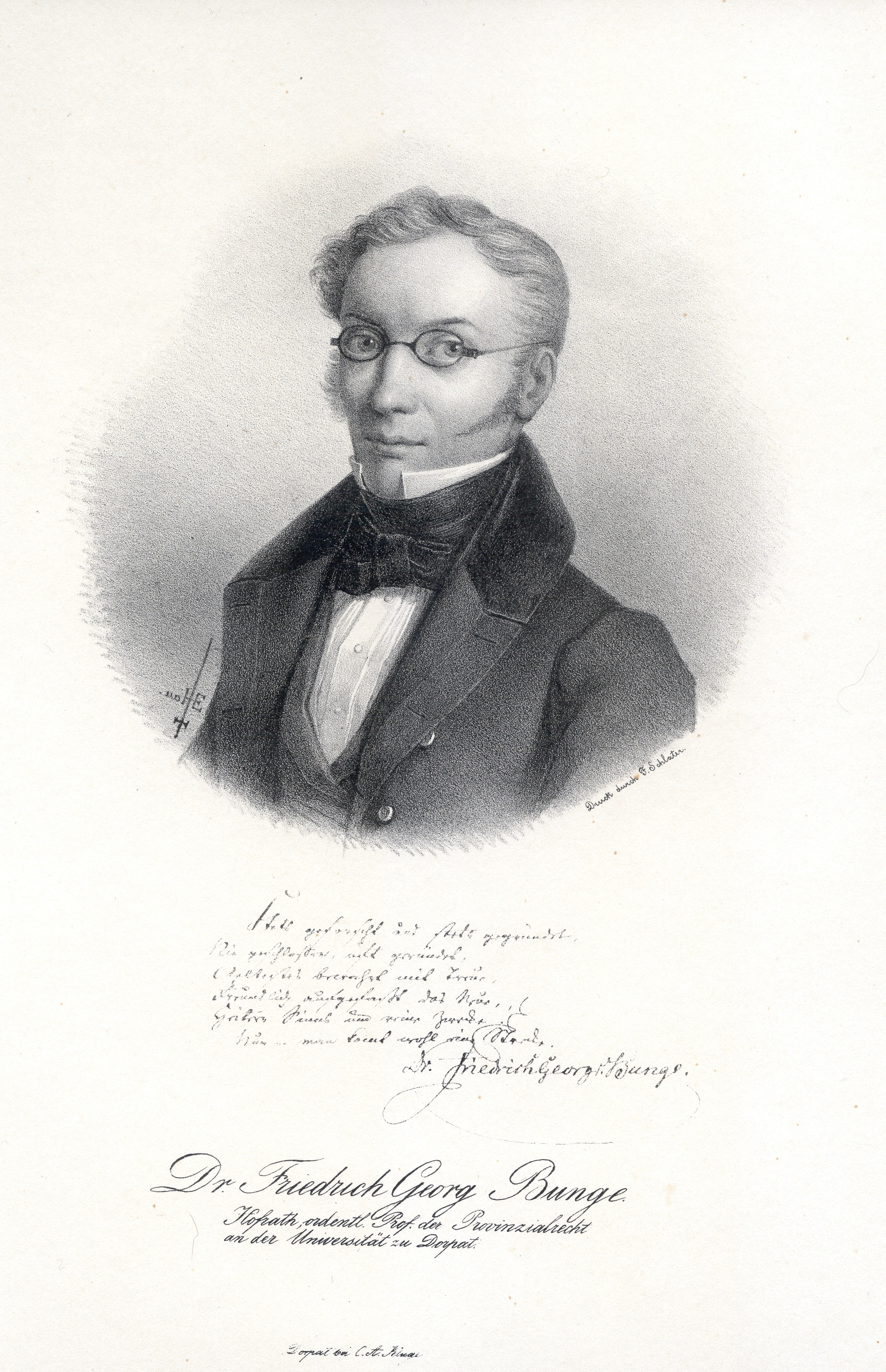
Friedrich von Bunge

== Watercolors ==
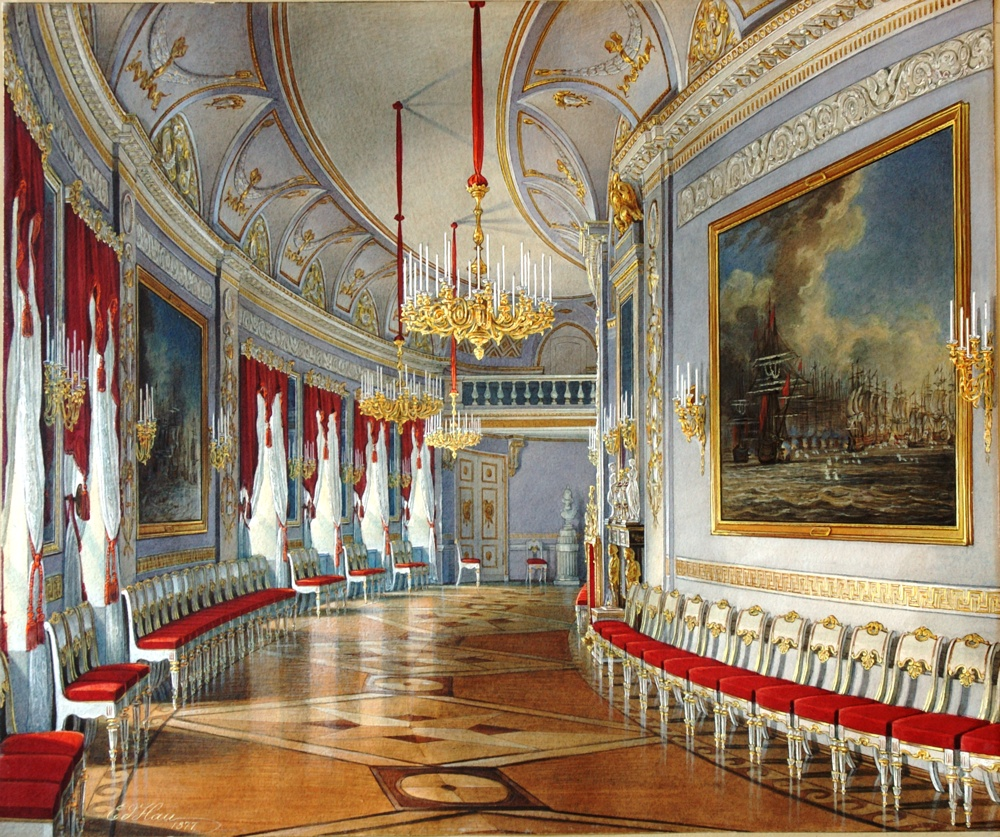
Chesma Seabattle (1770) Gallery of the Great Palace in Gatchina, 1877.

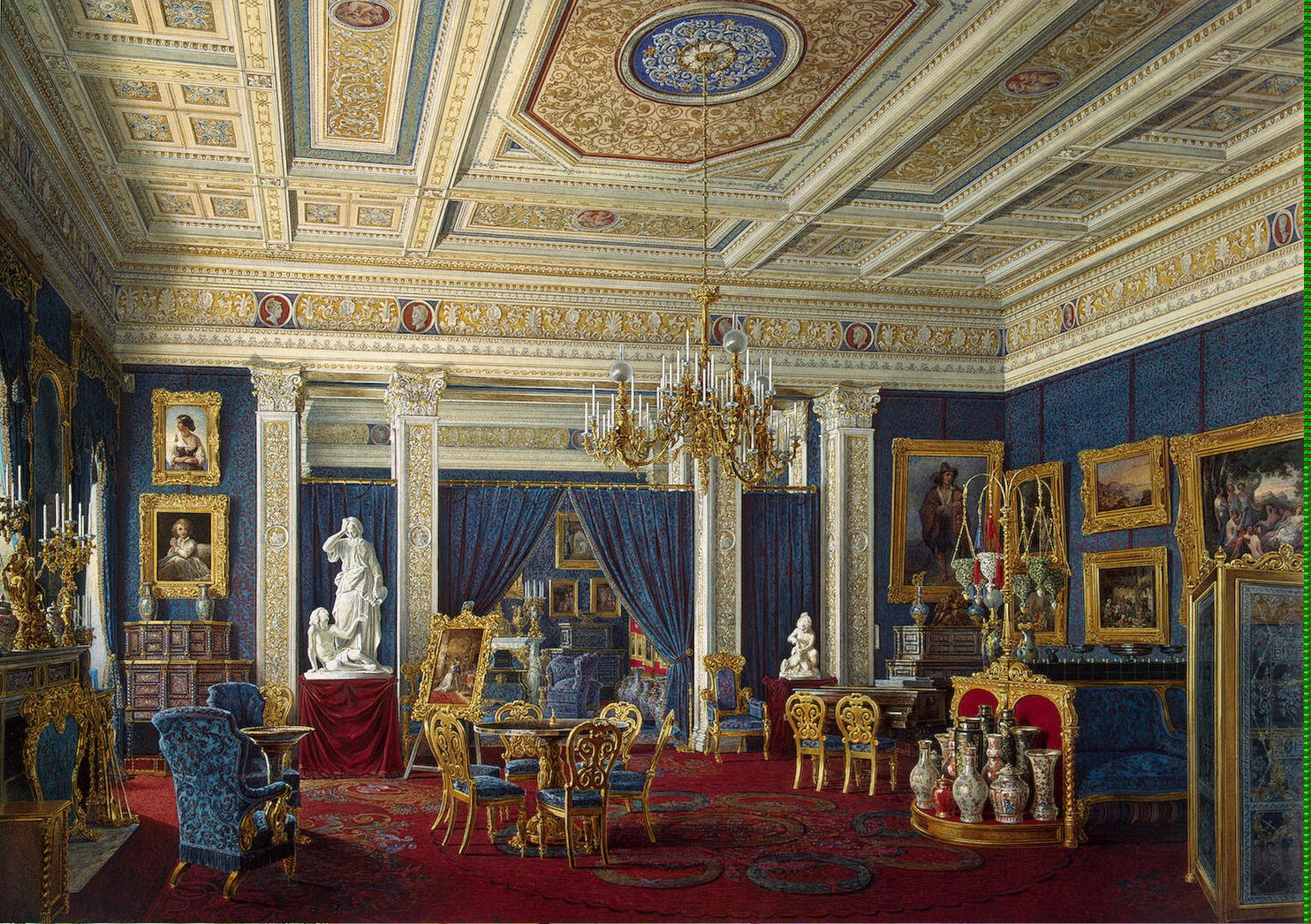
Blue Drawing-Room in the Mariinsky Palace, 1850's.

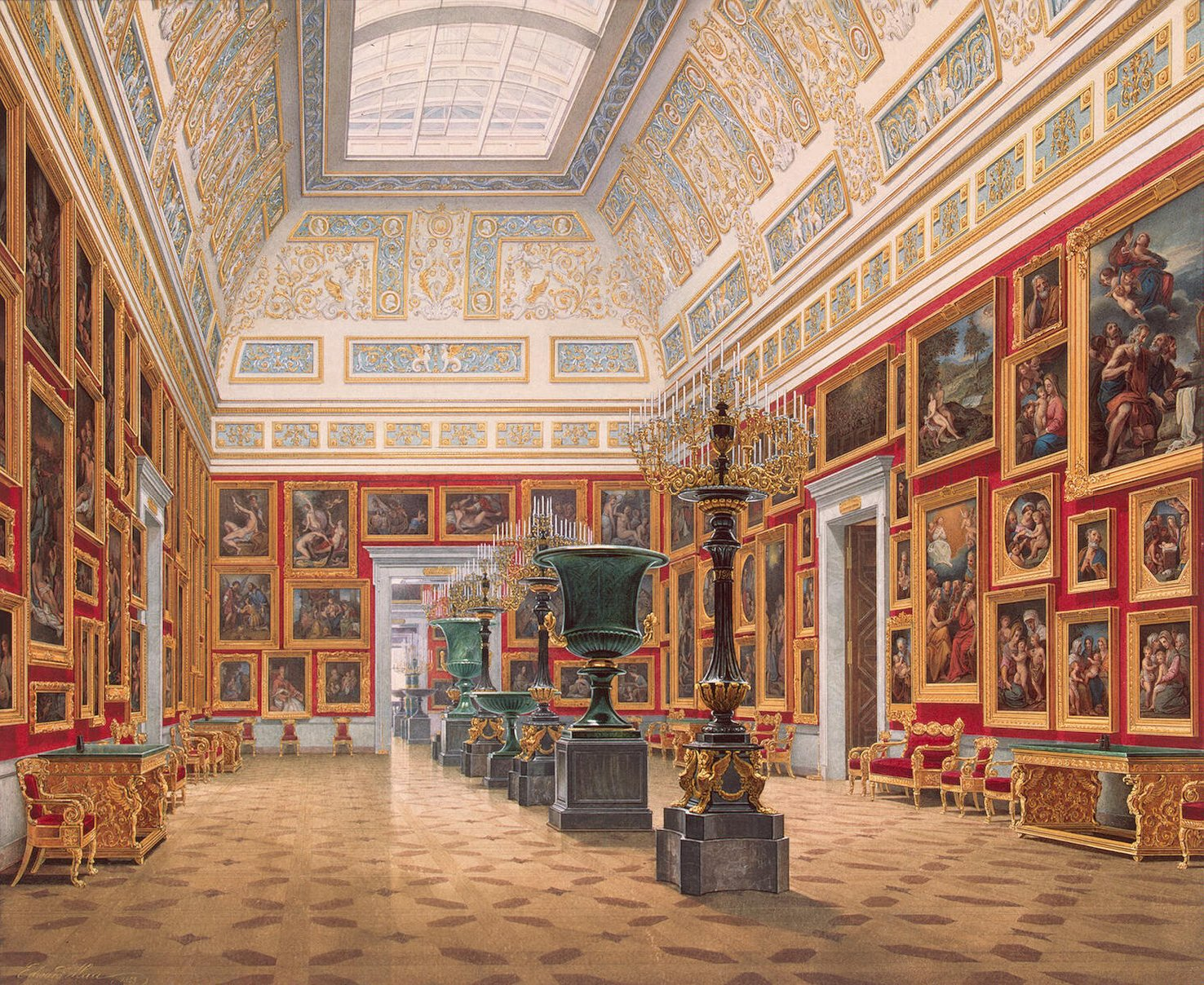
Interiors of the New Hermitage. The Room of Italian Art, 1853

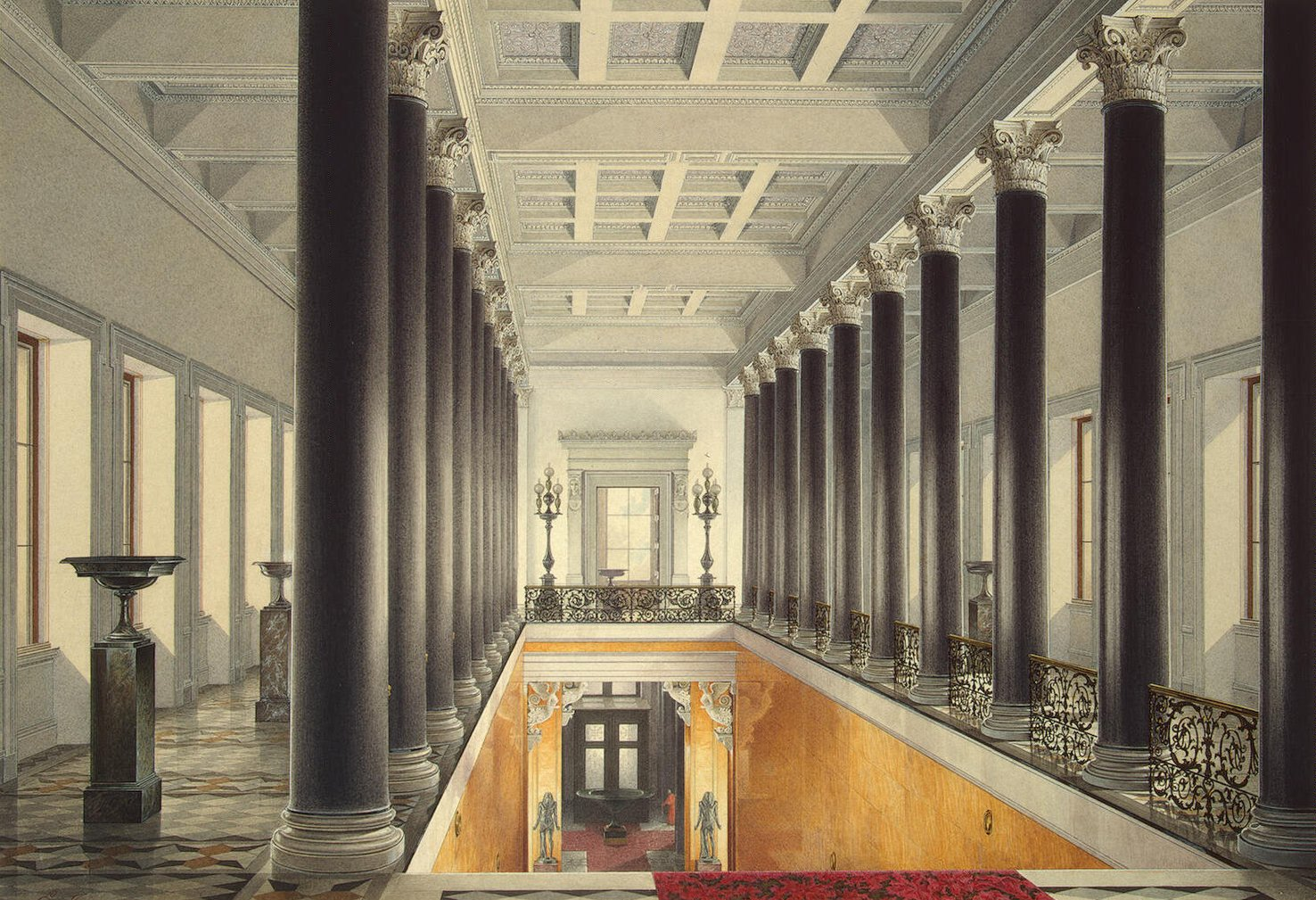
Interiors of the New Hermitage. The Upper Landing of the Main Staircase, 1853

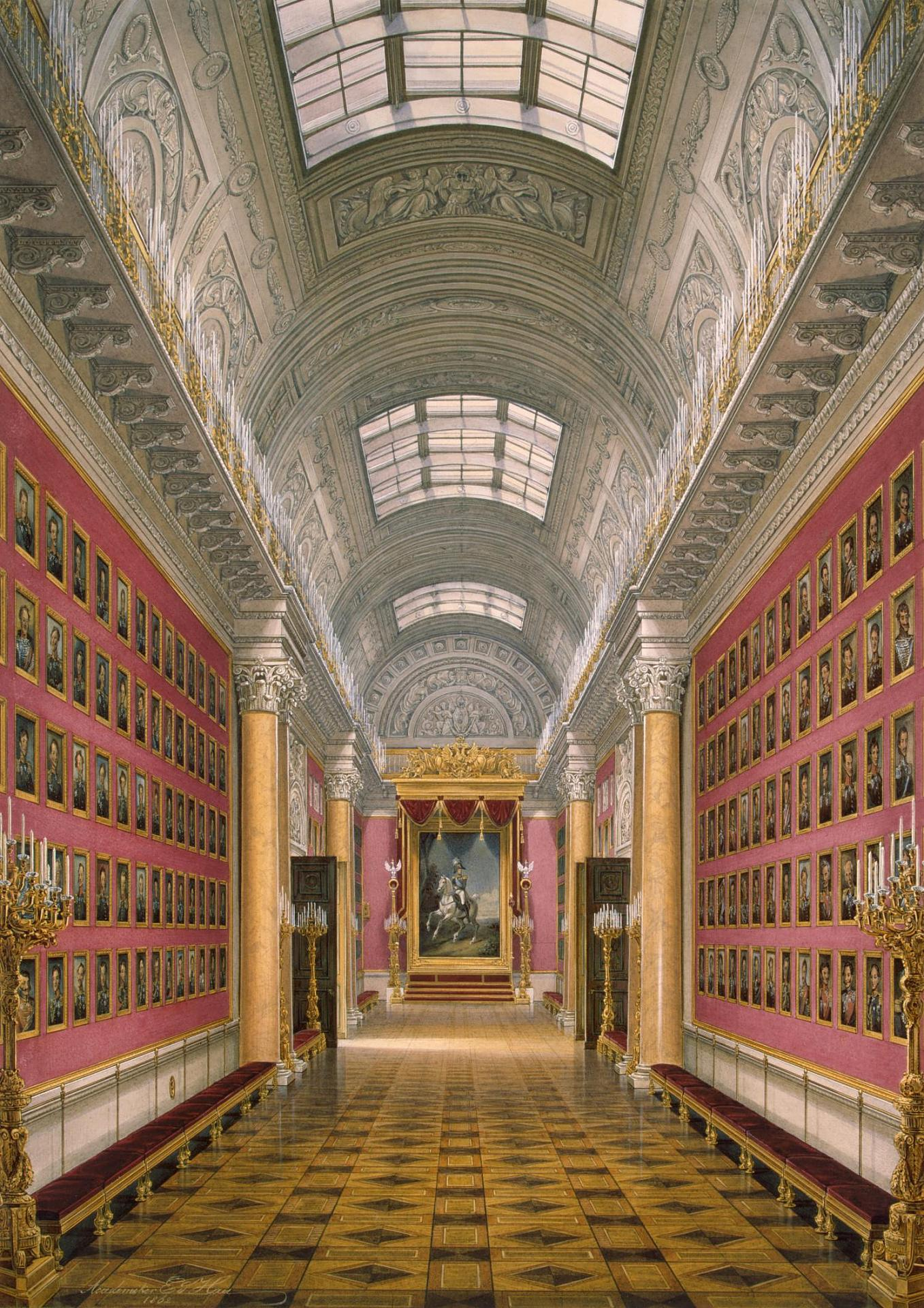
Military Gallery of The War of 1812. 1862, Winter Palace.

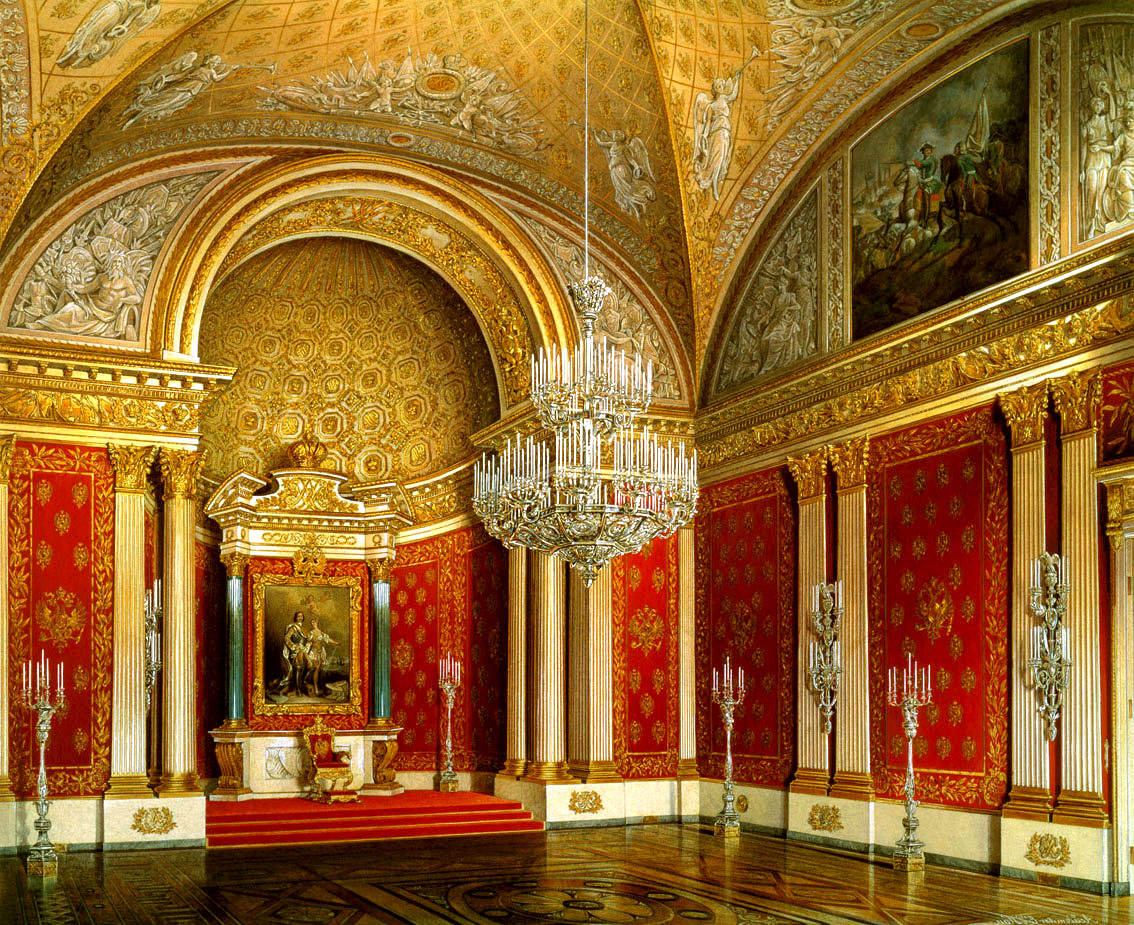
Peter the Great (Small Throne) Room, 1863 Winter Palace.

== Interiors of the Winter Palace ==
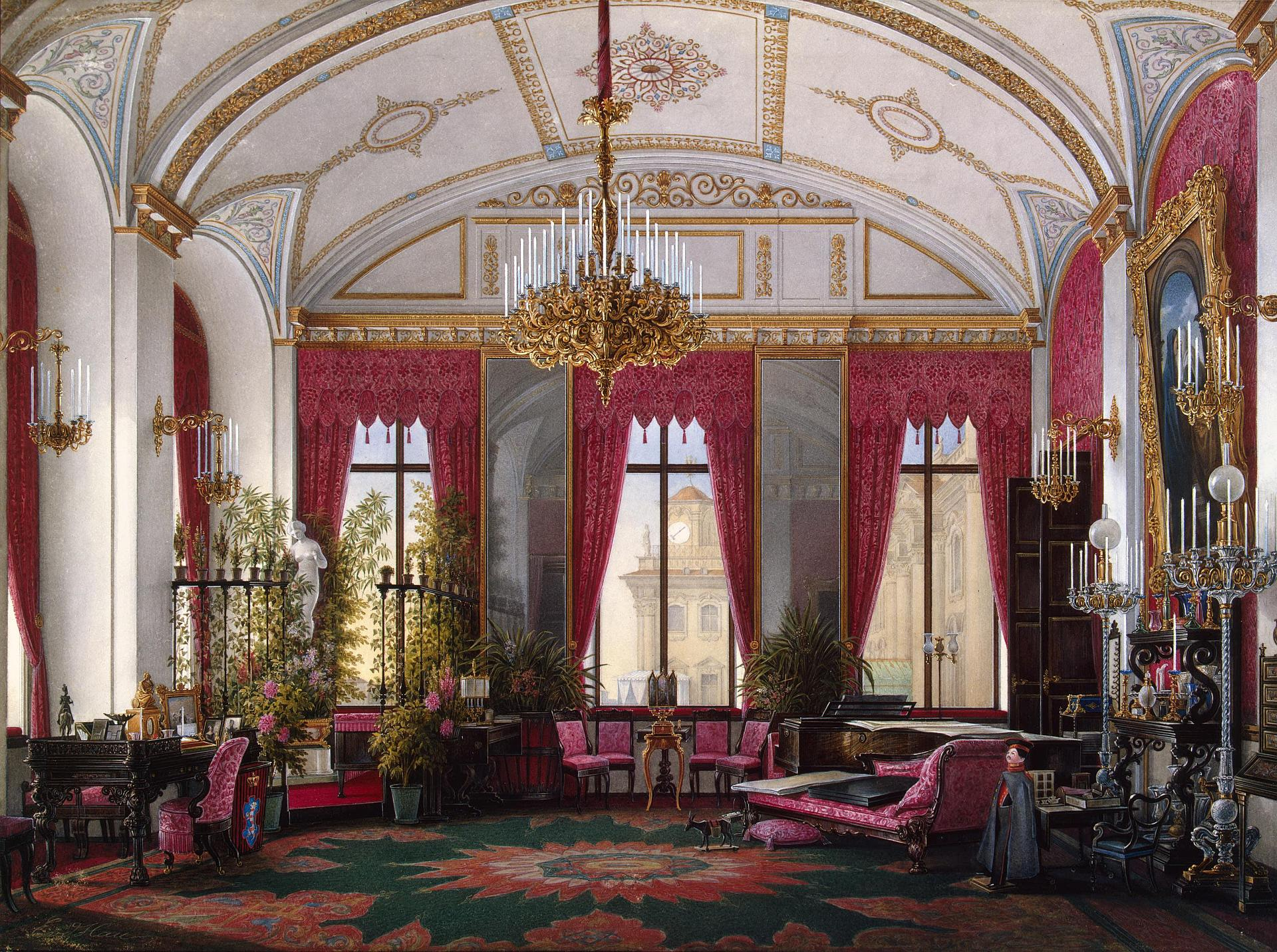
The Study of Empress Maria Alexandrovna, 1860.

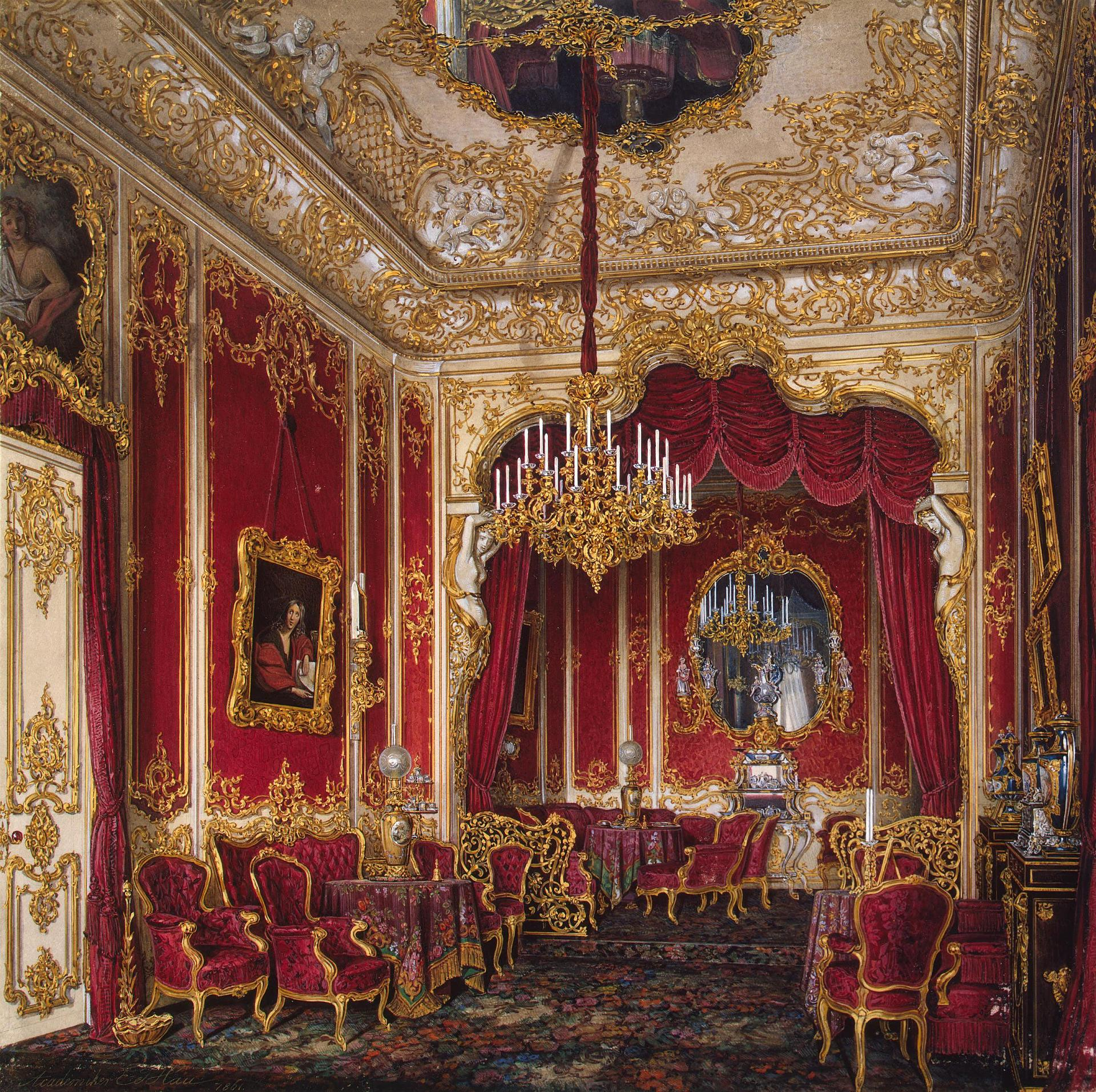
The Boudoir of Empress Maria Alexandrovna, 1861.

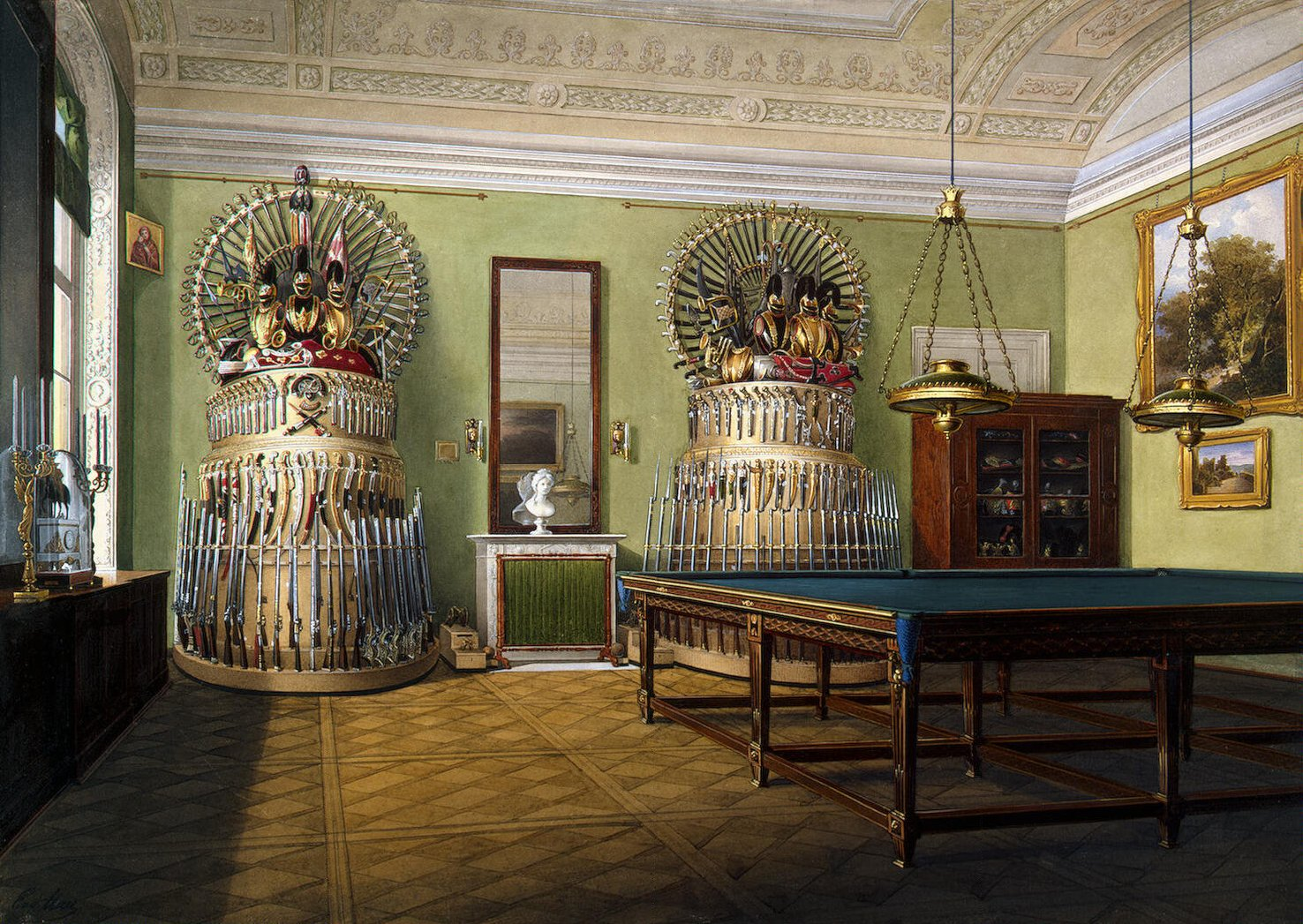
The Billiard Room of Emperor Alexander II, 1850.

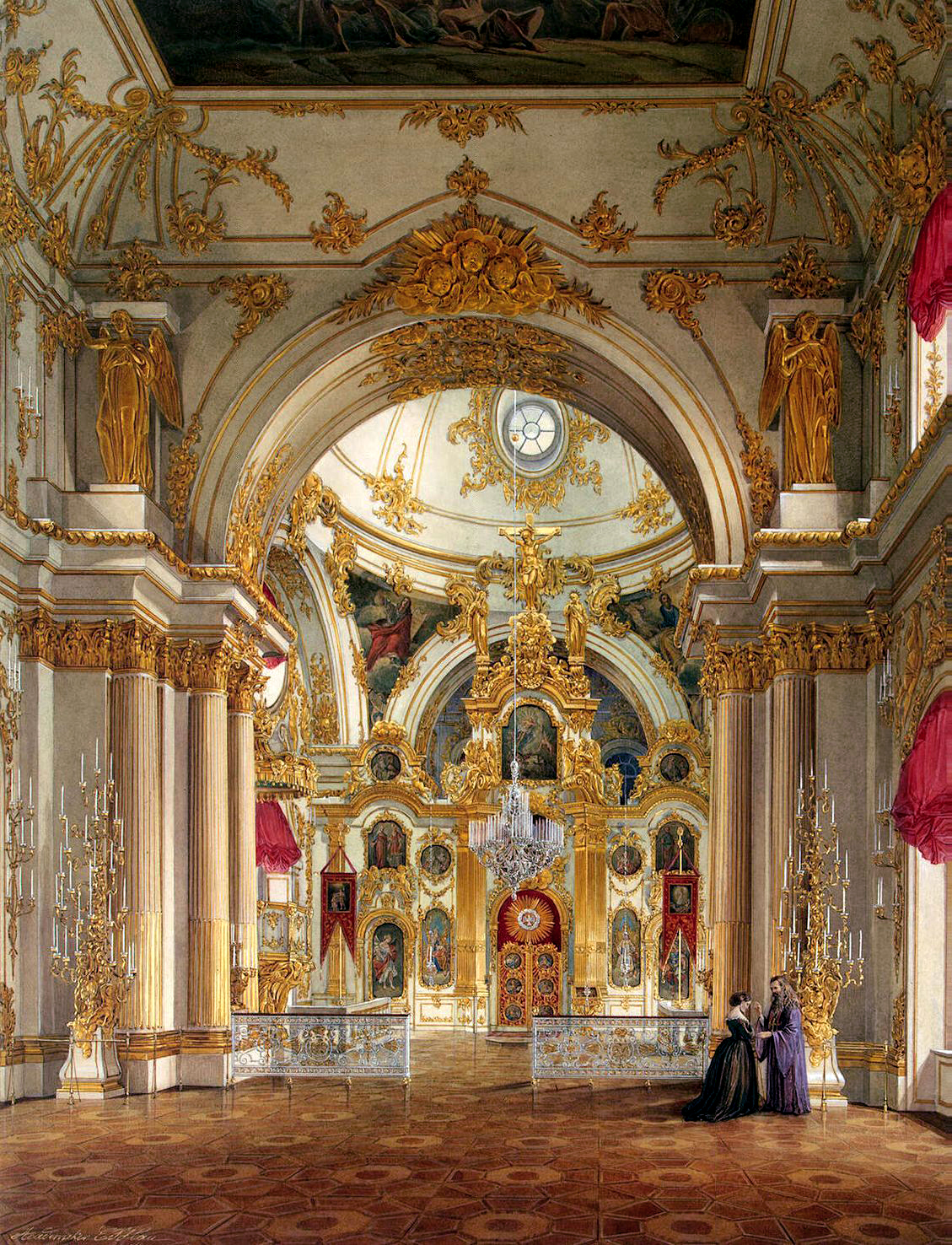
Grand Church of the Winter Palace, 1866.

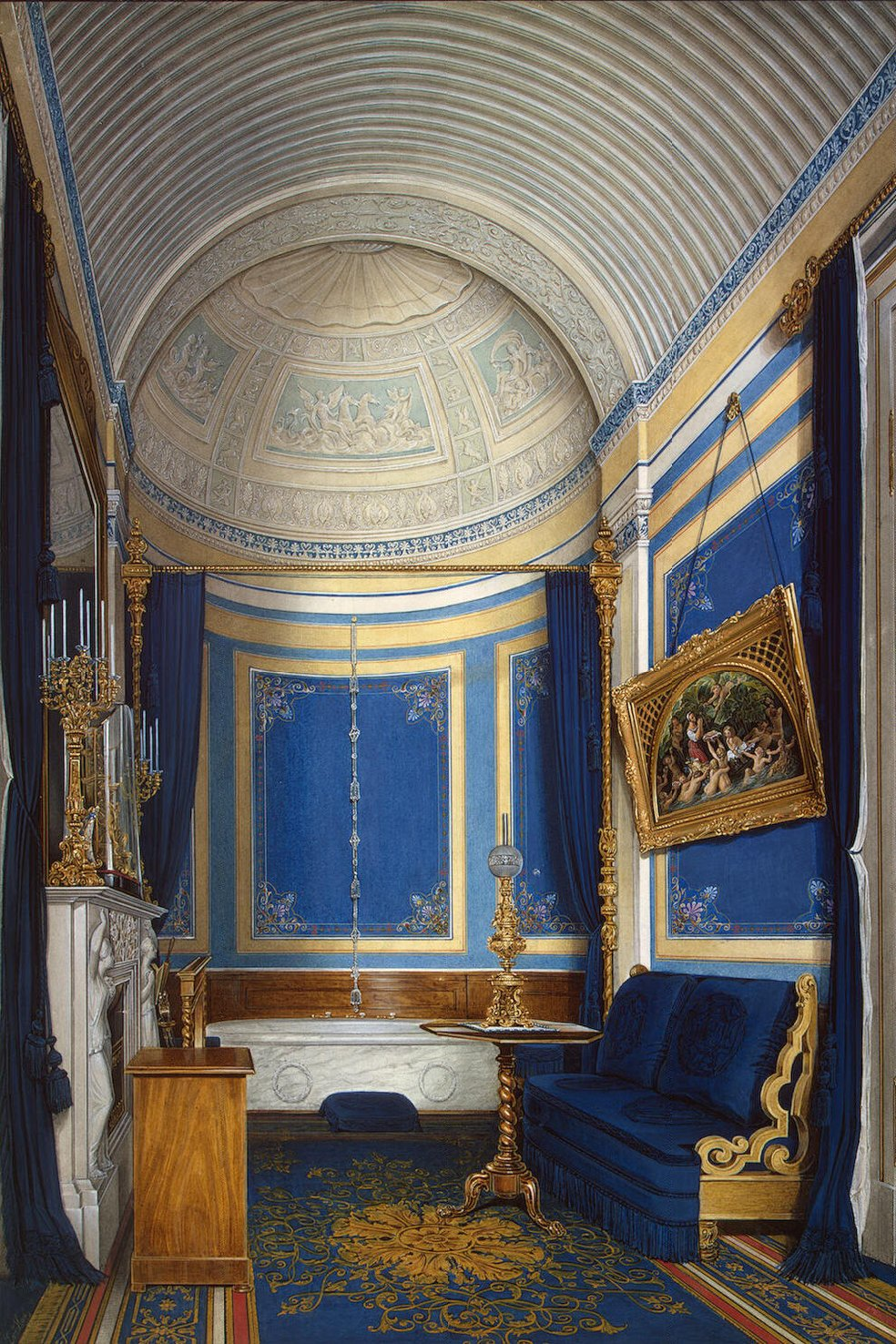
The Bathroom of Grand Princess Maria Alexandrovna, 1850s.

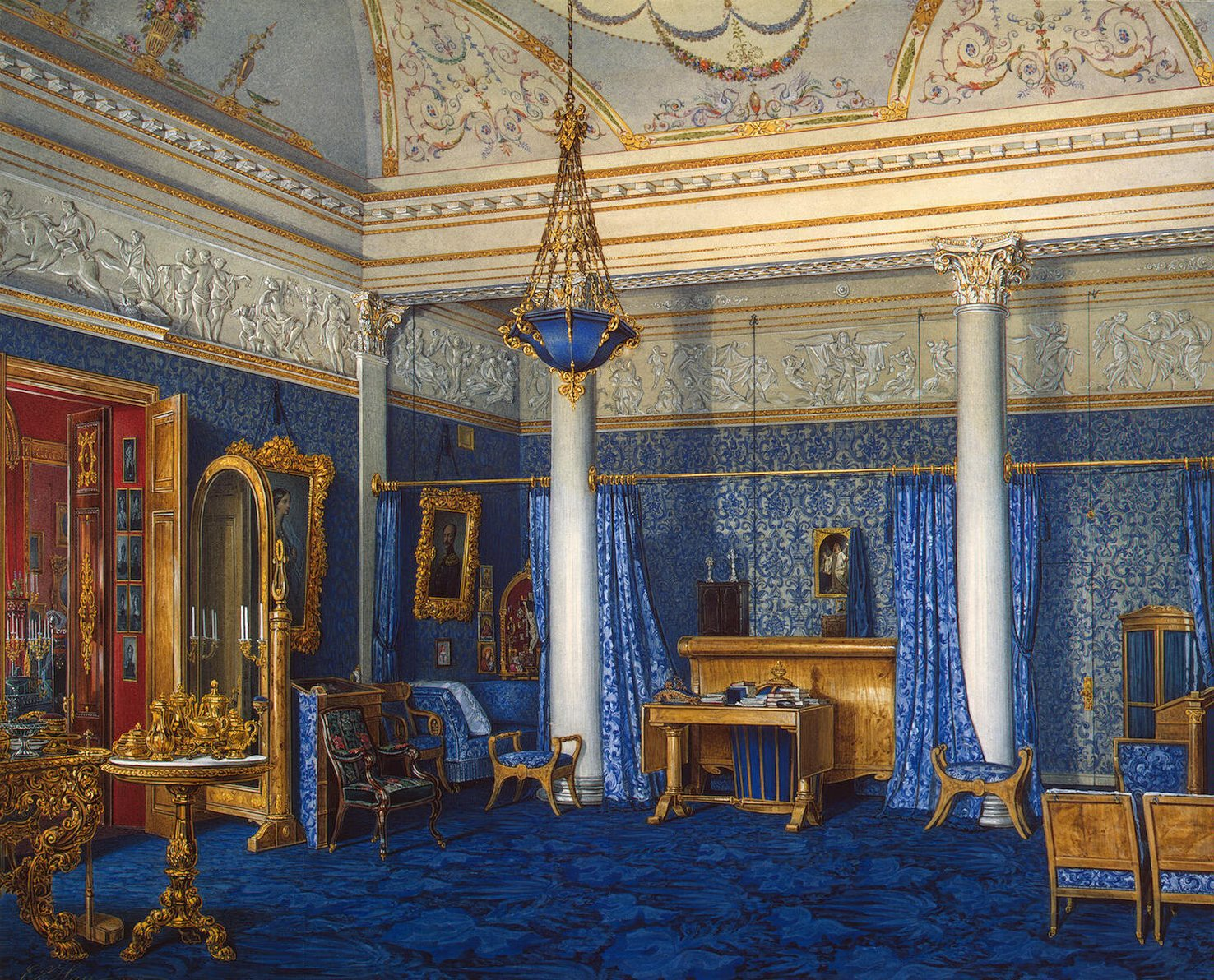
The Bedchamber of Empress Alexandra Feodorovna,1859.

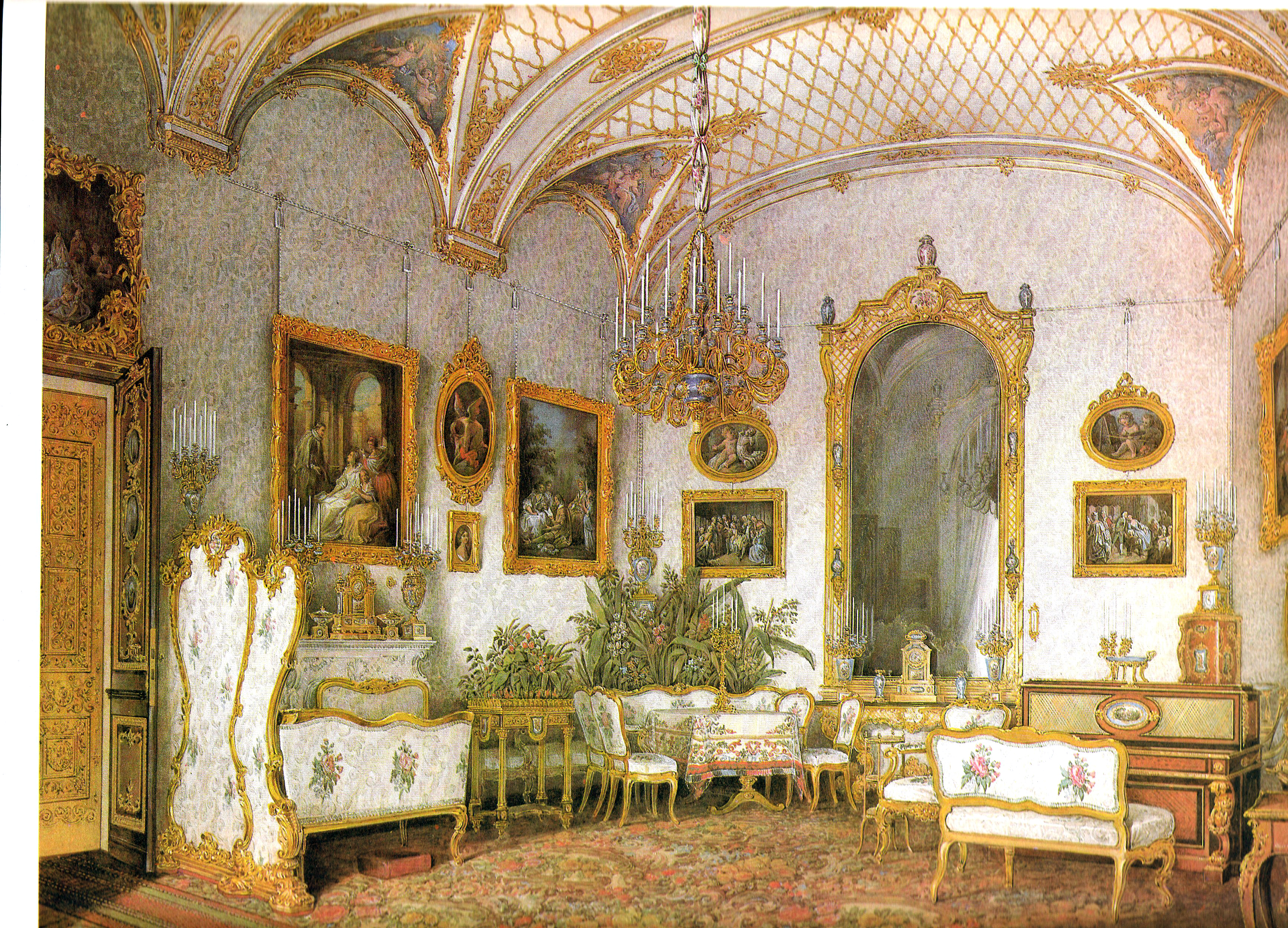
The White Drawing room of Empress Alexandra Feodorovna suite, 1860.

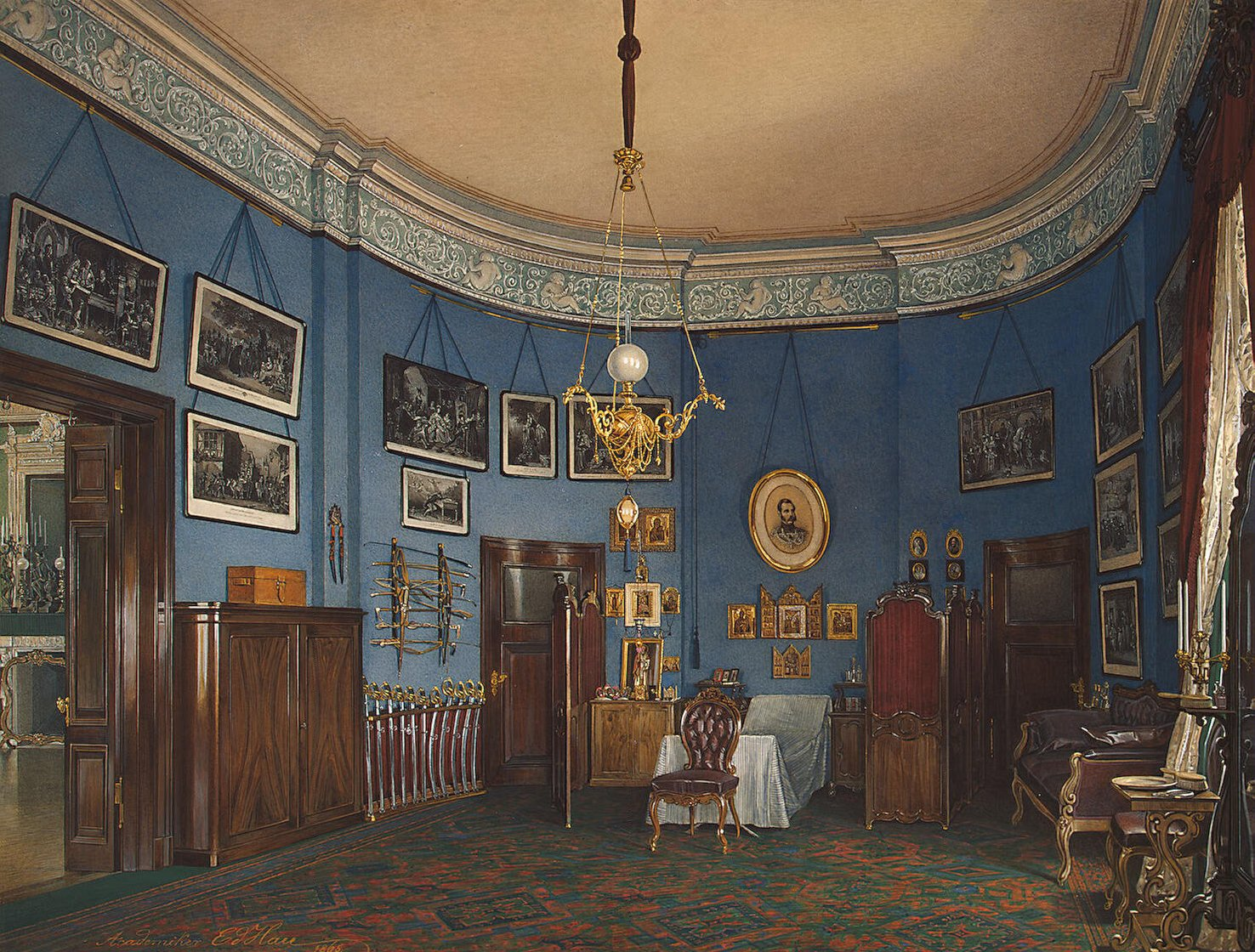
The Bedroom of Crown Prince Nikolai Alexandrovich, 1865.

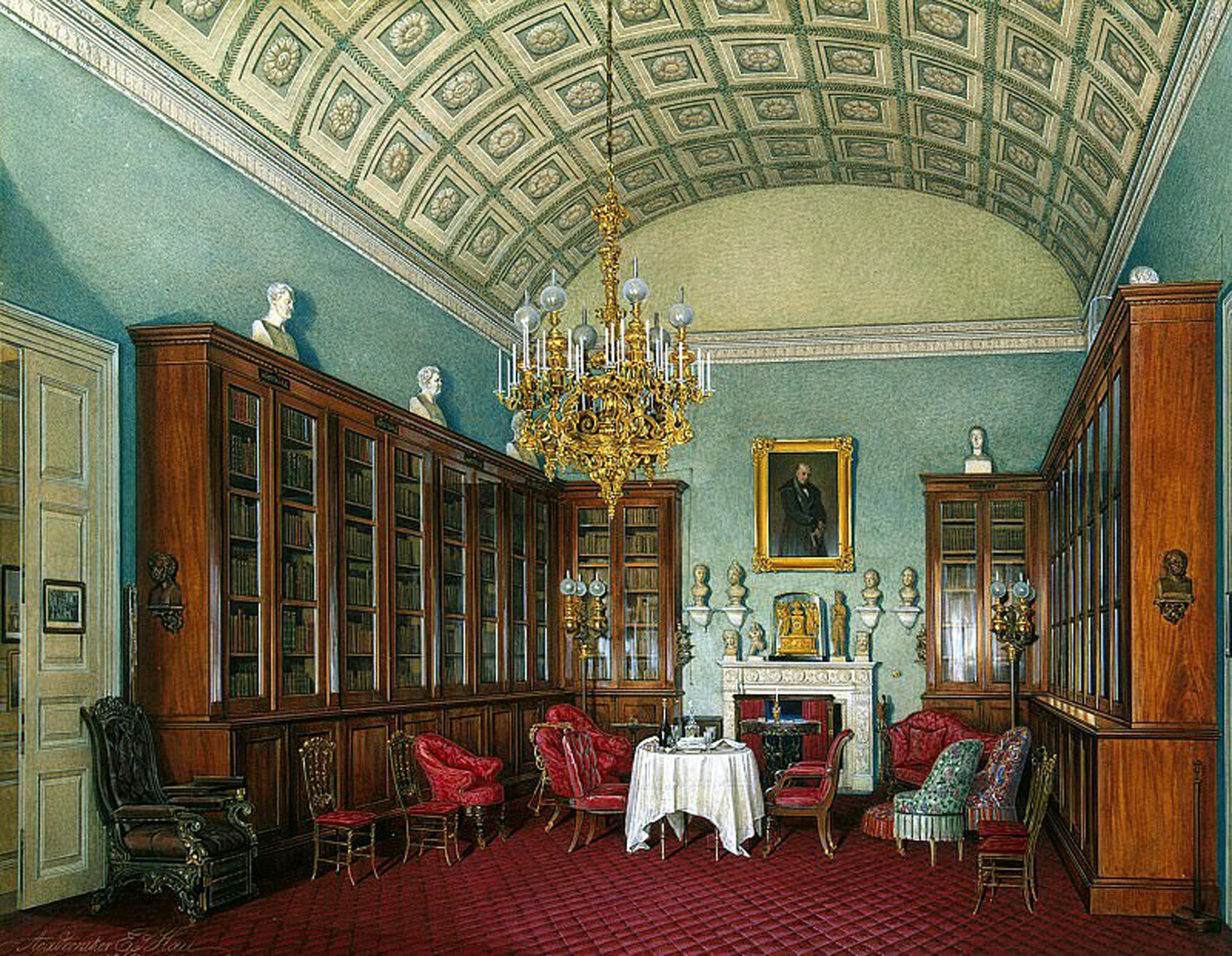
Library of Emperor Alexander II, 1867.

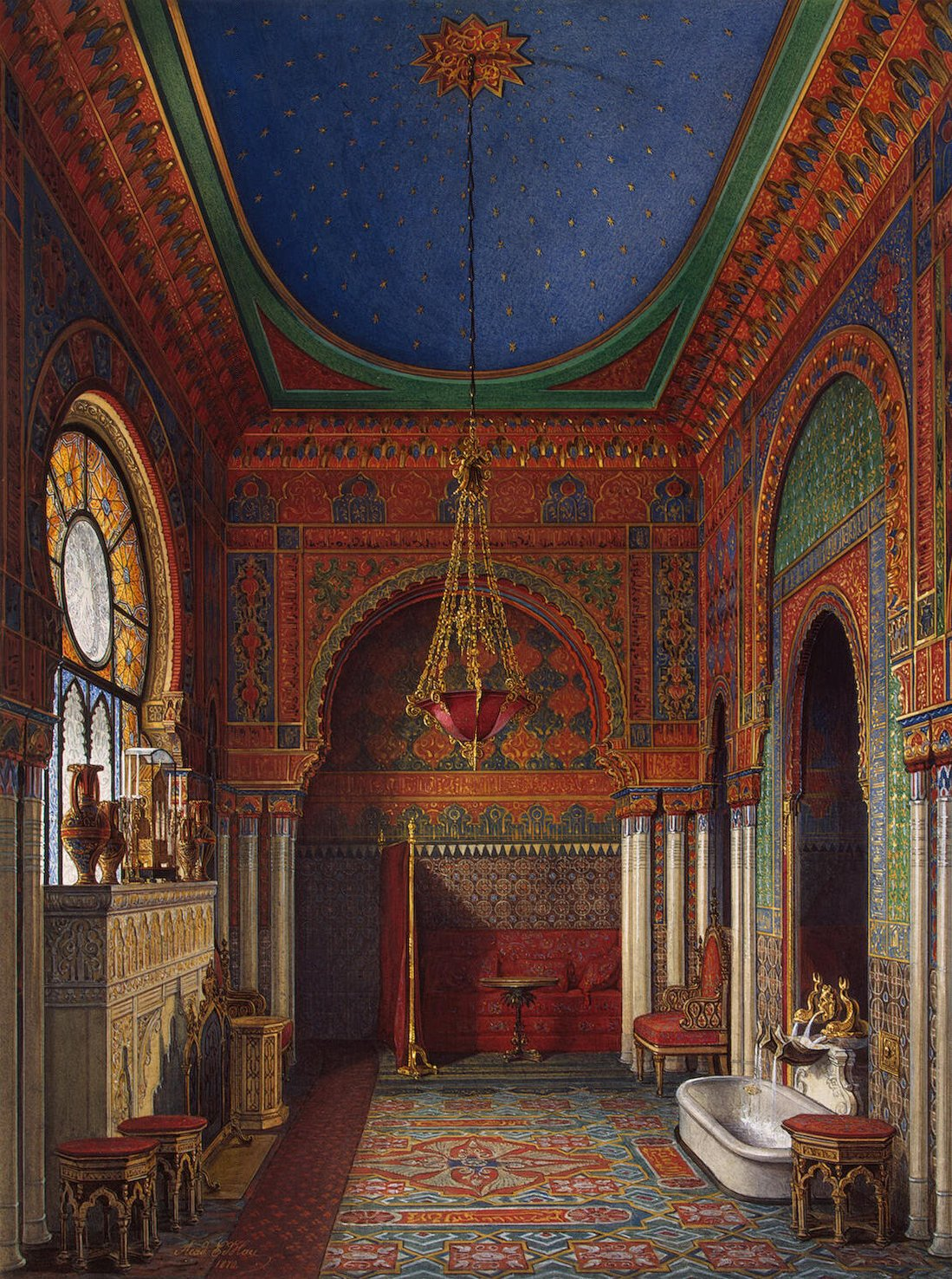
The Bathroom of Empress Alexandra Feodorovna, 1870.

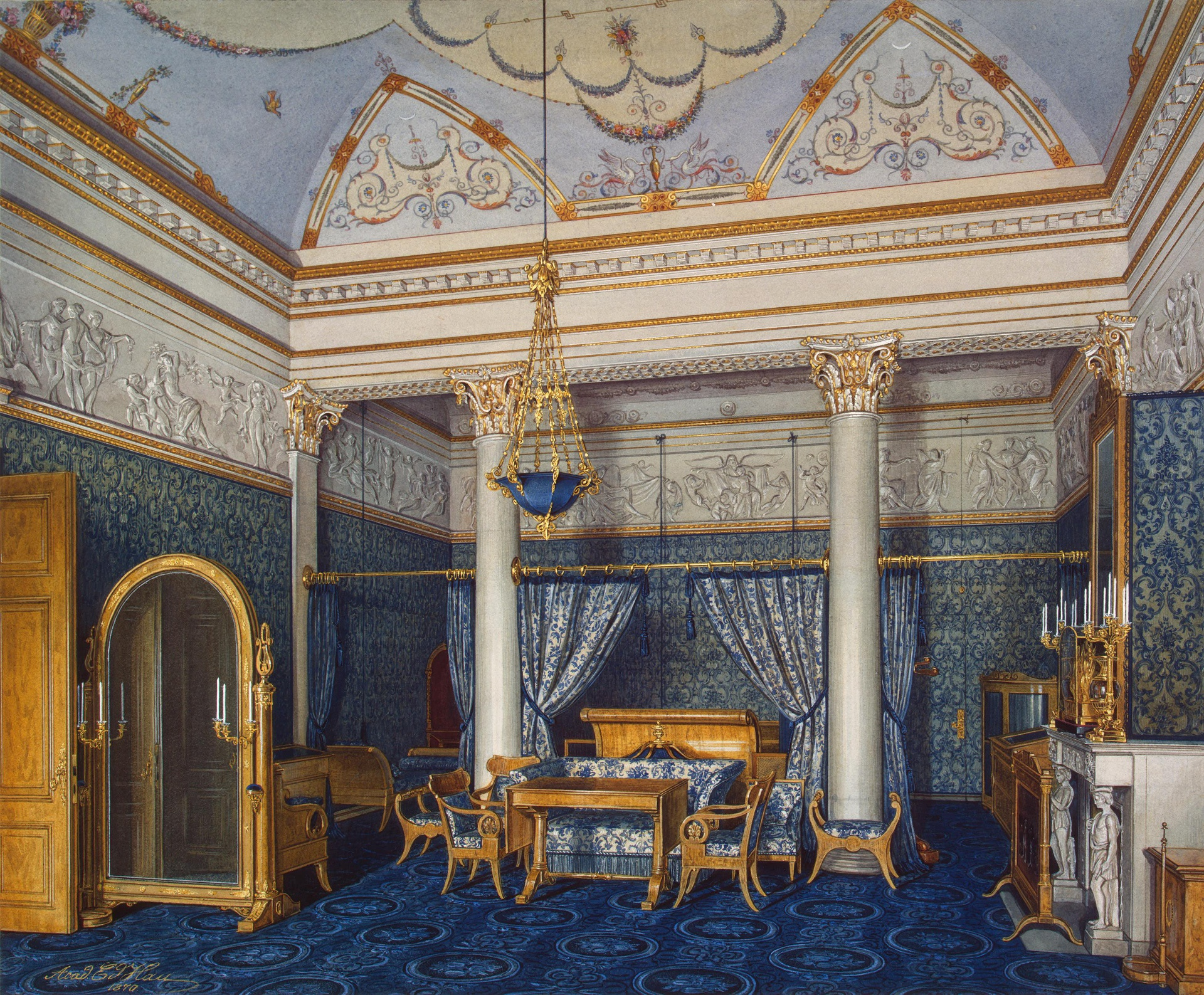
The Bedchamber of Empress Alexandra Fjodorovna, 1870.

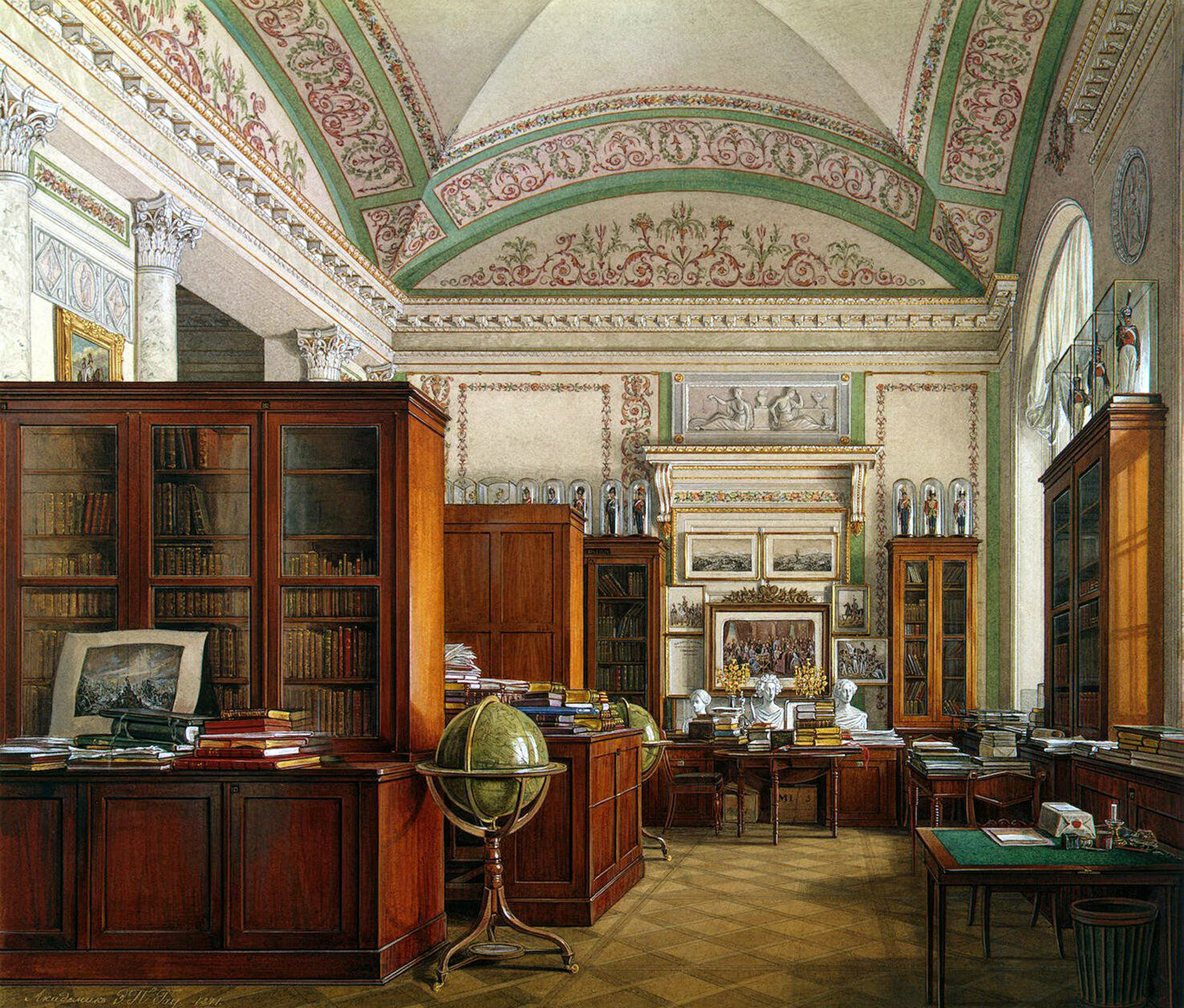
Library of Emperor Alexander II, 1871.

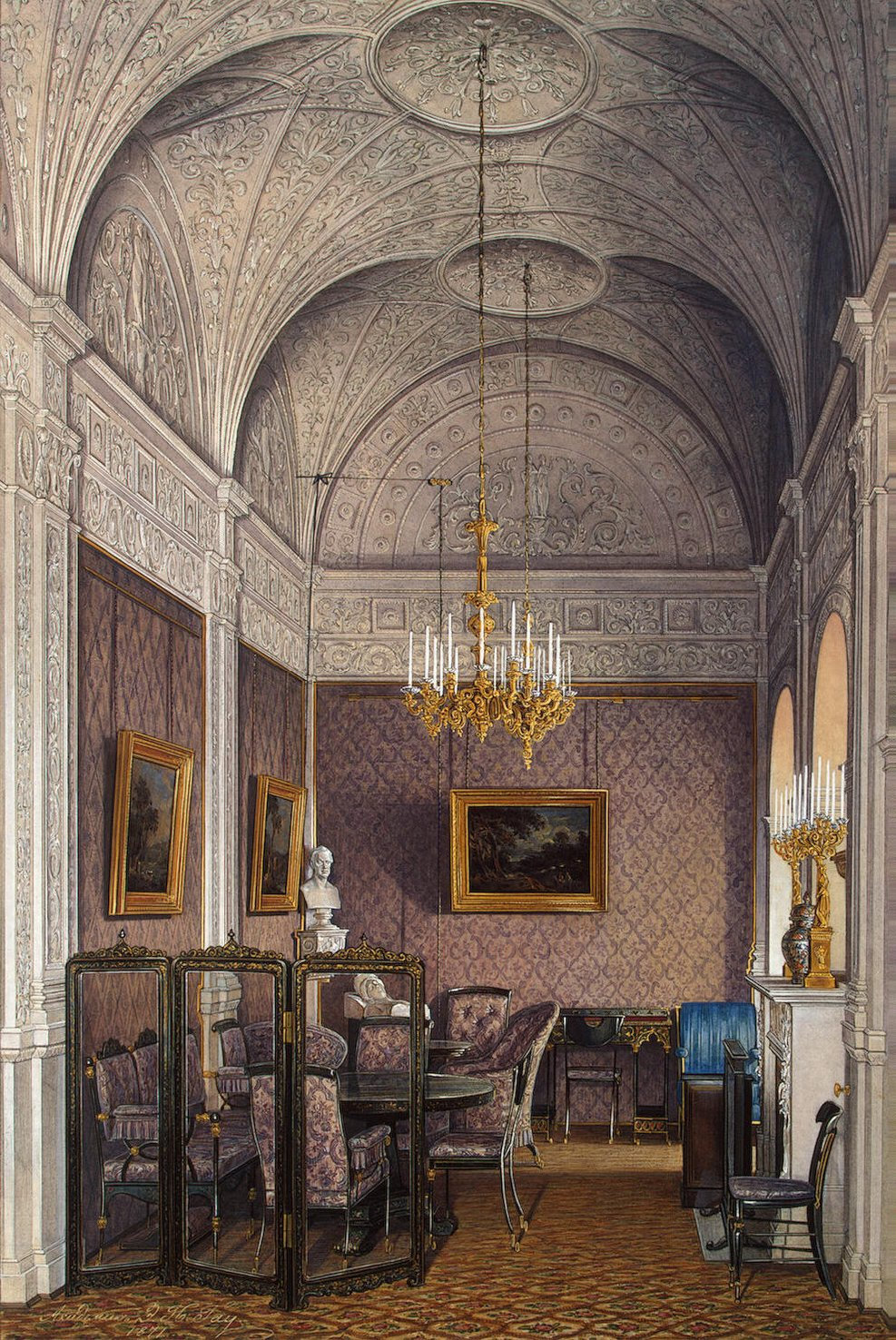
The Boudoir of Empress Alexandra Fjodorovna, 1871.

== Interiors of the Great Gatchina Palace ==
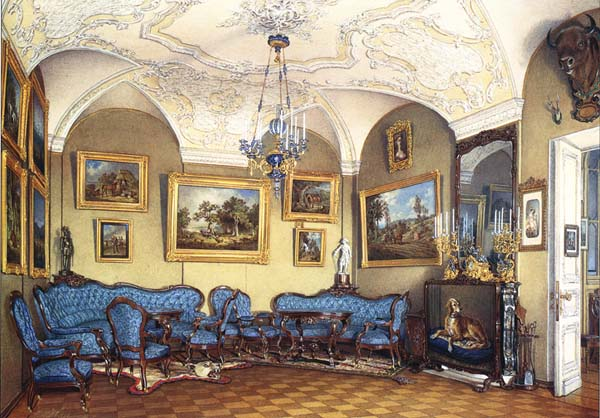
Drawing room in the Arsenal block (1858). 1874.

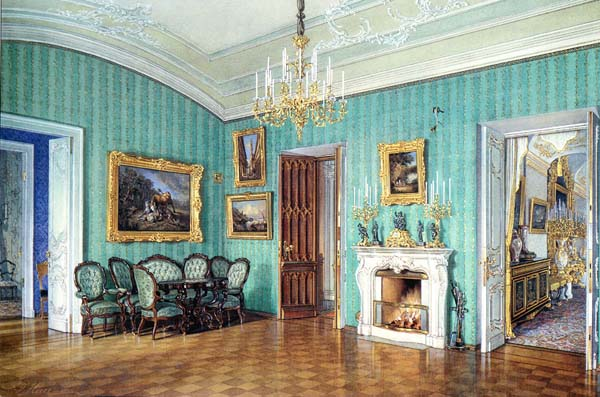
Reception room of Empress Alexandra Feodorovna, 1874.

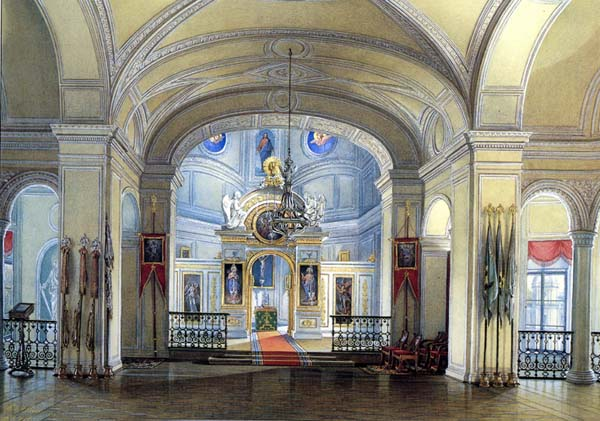
Church in the Gatchina Palace, 1875.

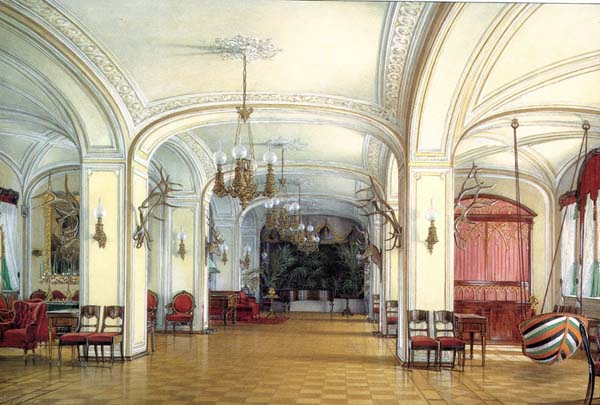
Arsenal Hall, 1876.

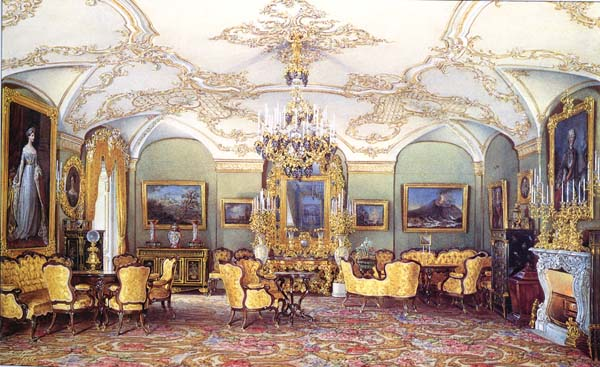
The Drawing Room of Empress Alexandra Feodorovna, 1876.

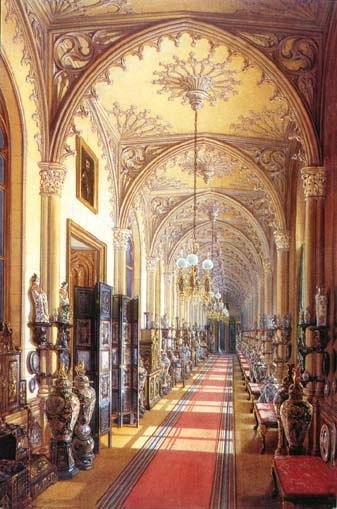
Chinese Gallery in the Gatchina Palace, 1876.

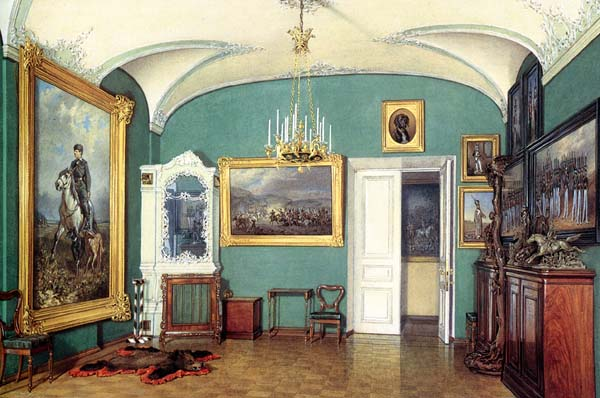
Reception room of Emperor Alexander II, 1876.

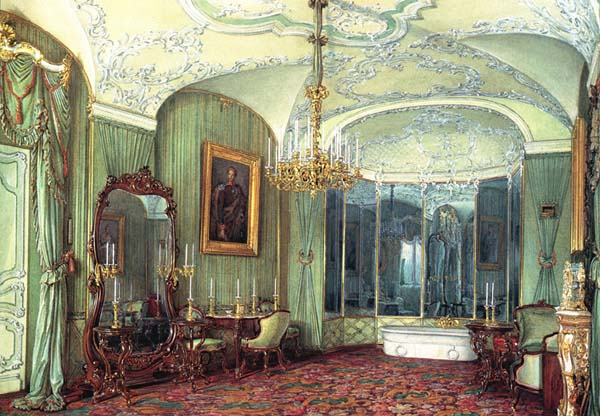
Empress Alexandra Feodorovna's bathroom, 1877.

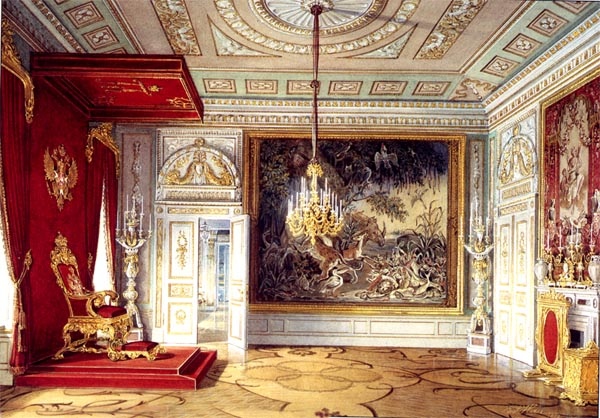
Throne Room of Emperor Paul I, 1878.
