= Astragalus bakaliensis =

Scientific classification
- Kingdom: Plantae
- Clade: Tracheophytes
- Clade: Angiosperms
- Clade: Eudicots
- Clade: Rosids
- Order: Fabales
- Family: Fabaceae
- Subfamily: Faboideae
- Genus: Astragalus
- Species: A. bakaliensis

Binomial name
- Astragalus bakaliensis Bunge

Synonyms
- Astragalus elegantulus Bornm. & Gauba; Astragalus fraternellus Bornm.; Astragalus parimanicus Parsa; Astragalus razicus Parsa; Astragalus vandshinus Lipsky; Tragacantha bakaliensis (Bunge) Kuntze

Species of plant

Astragalus bakaliensis is a species of flowering plant in the large legume genus Astragalus (Fabaceae). It is native to central Asia, Iran, and Pakistan. Astragalus bakaliensis was first formally named by Russian botanist Alexander von Bunge in 1851.

== Description ==
It flowers in March. It is most commonly found in the months of March, April, and May. It is most commonly found in the countries of Iran and Afghanistan.
