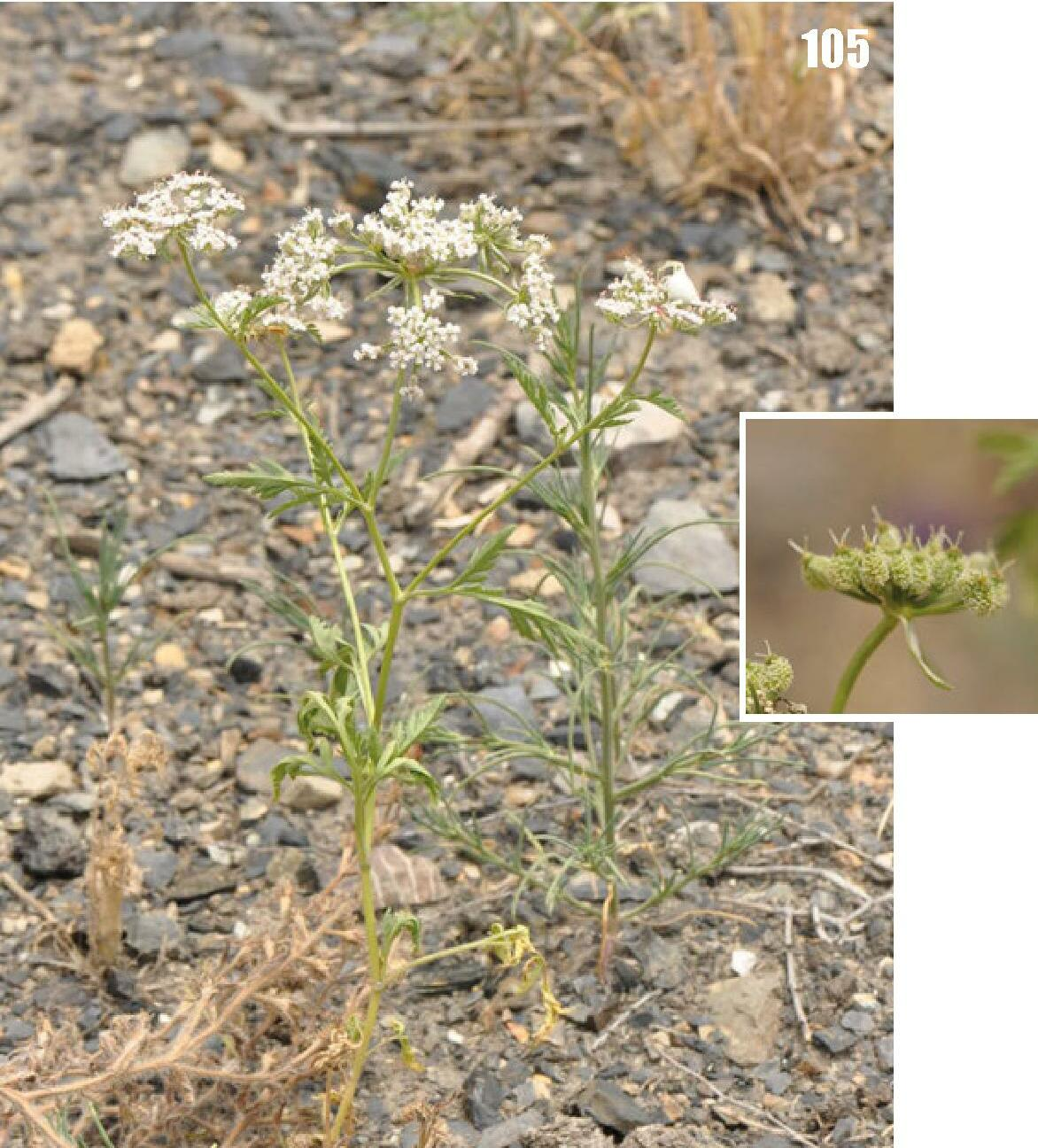

Scientific classification
- Kingdom: Plantae
- Clade: Tracheophytes
- Clade: Angiosperms
- Clade: Eudicots
- Clade: Asterids
- Order: Apiales
- Family: Apiaceae
- Subfamily: Apioideae
- Tribe: Pleurospermeae
- Genus: Eremodaucus; Bunge
- Species: E. lehmannii

Binomial name
- Eremodaucus lehmannii Bunge

= Eremodaucus =

Genus of plants

Eremodaucus is a genus of flowering plants belonging to the family Apiaceae. Its only species is Eremodaucus lehmannii. Its native range is Caucasus to Western and Central Asia.
