= Astragalus ochreatus =

Scientific classification
- Kingdom: Plantae
- Clade: Tracheophytes
- Clade: Angiosperms
- Clade: Eudicots
- Clade: Rosids
- Order: Fabales
- Family: Fabaceae
- Subfamily: Faboideae
- Genus: Astragalus
- Species: A. ochreatus

Binomial name
- Astragalus ochreatus Bunge

Species of legume

Astragalus ochreatus is a species of milkvetch in the family Fabaceae. It is found in the North Khorasan province of Iran in Sarigol National Park.
