= Astragalus chiwensis =

Scientific classification
- Kingdom: Plantae
- Clade: Tracheophytes
- Clade: Angiosperms
- Clade: Eudicots
- Clade: Rosids
- Order: Fabales
- Family: Fabaceae
- Subfamily: Faboideae
- Genus: Astragalus
- Species: A. chiwensis

Binomial name
- Astragalus chiwensis Bunge

Synonyms
- Astragalus registanicus (Rech.F.)

Species of legume

Astragalus chiwensis is a species of milkvetch in the family Fabaceae. It is native to Afghanistan, Kazakhstan, Tadzhikistan, Turkmenistan, and Uzbekistan.
