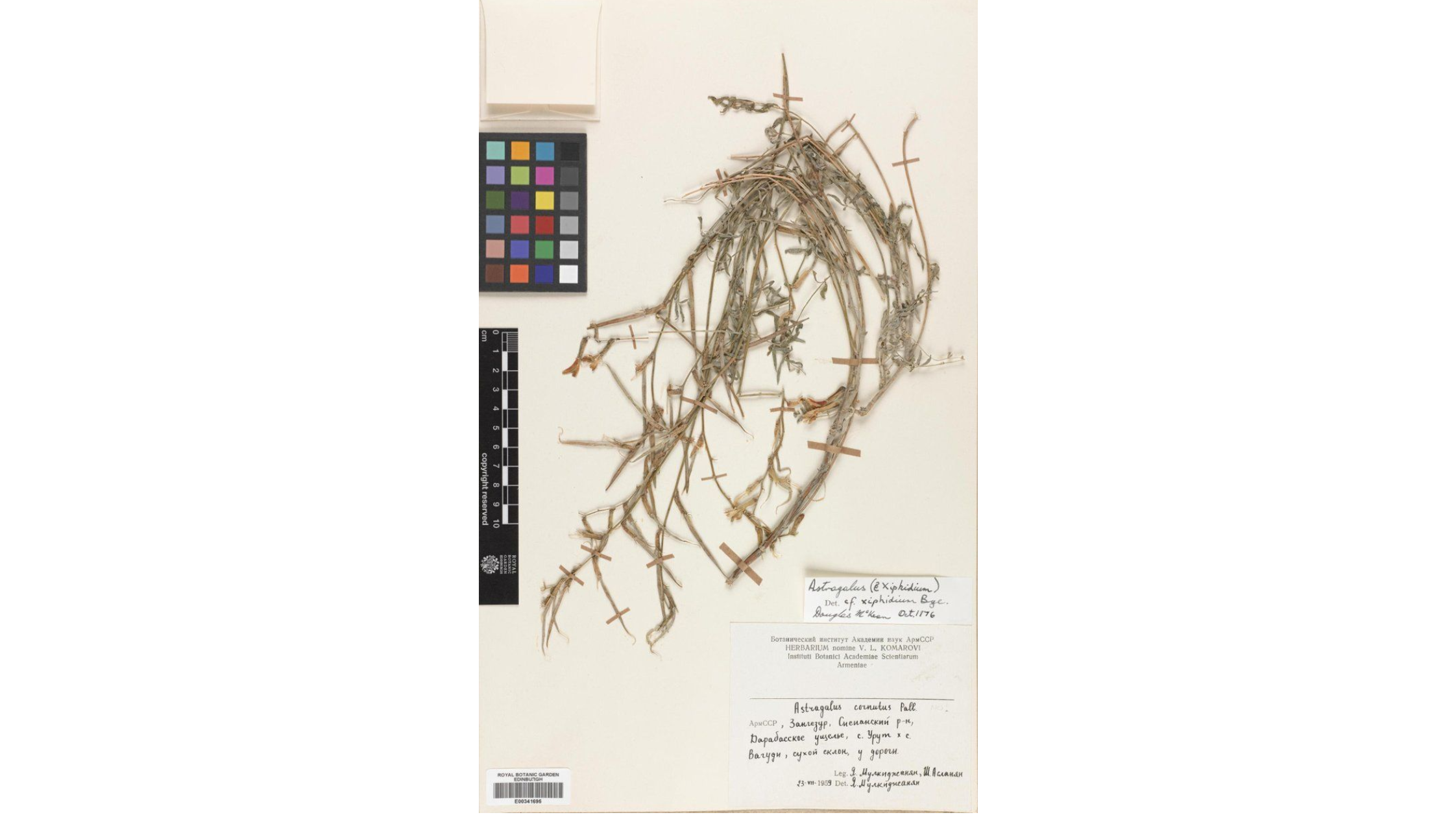

Conservation status
- Endangered (IUCN 3.1)

Scientific classification
- Kingdom: Plantae
- Clade: Tracheophytes
- Clade: Angiosperms
- Clade: Eudicots
- Clade: Rosids
- Order: Fabales
- Family: Fabaceae
- Subfamily: Faboideae
- Genus: Astragalus
- Species: A. xiphidium

Binomial name
- Astragalus xiphidium Bunge

Synonyms
- Astragalus maraziensis Rzazade.; Tragacantha procerior Kuntze.

= Astragalus xiphidium =

Species of flowering plant

Astragalus xiphidium is a species of flowering plant in the family Fabaceae.

It was first described in 1868, by Alexander von Bunge.

== Description ==
Astragalus xiphidium is a perennial semi-shrub, around 15–40 centimetres (0.49–1.31 ft) tall. It is a salt-resistant xerophyte, and grows near plants of the genus Artemisia.

== Distribution ==
Astragalus xiphidium is native to the South Caucasus, northwest Iran, and Azerbaijan. The species grows on dry slopes, in semi-desert environments. It has been found in five locations, across an area of 20 square kilometres (7.7 sq mi).

== Conservation ==
In 2008, A. xiphidium was listed as endangered by the IUCN. It faces habitat decline due to overgrazing and construction. No conservation action was in place as of 2008.
