= Lagochilin =

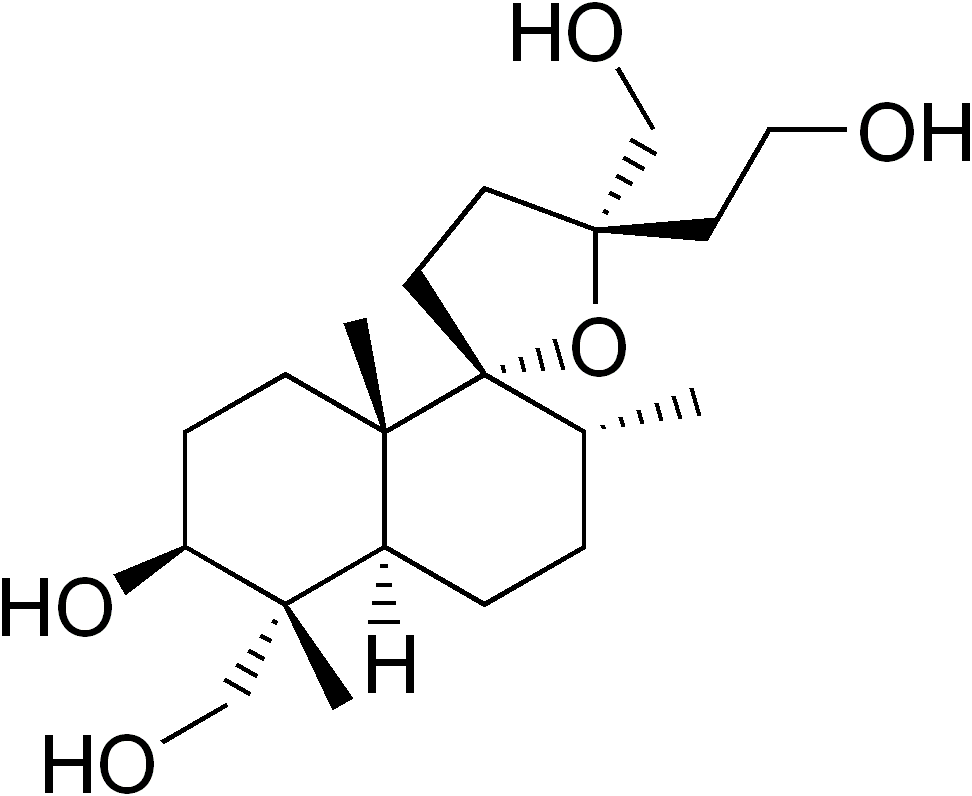

Names
- IUPAC name (13S)-9α,13-Epoxy-8α-labdane-3β,15,16,18-tetrol
- Systematic IUPAC name (1R,2R,4aS,5R,5′S,6S)-5′-(2-Hydroxyethyl)-5,5′-bis(hydroxymethyl)-2,5,8a-trimethyloctahydro-2H-spiro[naphthalene-1,2′-oxolan]-6-ol

Identifiers
CAS Number	23554-81-6
3D model (JSmol)	Interactive image
ChemSpider	5417062
PubChem CID	7061097
UNII	S62BXK5HES
CompTox Dashboard (EPA)	DTXSID30392905
- InChI: InChI=1S/C20H36O5/c1-14-4-5-15-17(2,12-22)16(24)6-7-18(15,3)20(14)9-8-19(13-23,25-20)10-11-21/h14-16,21-24H,4-13H2,1-3H3/t14-,15+,16+,17+,18+,19+,20-/m1/s1 Key: XYPPDQHBNJURHU-IPOQXWOTSA-N; InChI=1/C20H36O5/c1-14-4-5-15-17(2,12-22)16(24)6-7-18(15,3)20(14)9-8-19(13-23,25-20)10-11-21/h14-16,21-24H,4-13H2,1-3H3/t14-,15+,16+,17+,18+,19+,20-/m1/s1 Key: XYPPDQHBNJURHU-IPOQXWOTBH
- SMILES: C[C@@]1(CO)[C@@H](O)CC[C@@]2(C)[C@]([H])1CC[C@@H](C)[C@]32O[C@](CO)(CCO)CC3

Properties
Chemical formula	C_{20}H_{36}O_{5}
Molar mass	356.495 g/mol
Appearance	Light grey crystalline solid
- Except where otherwise noted, data are given for materials in their standard state (at 25 °C [77 °F], 100 kPa). verify (what is ?) Infobox references

Lagochilin is a bitter diterpene that forms a grey crystalline solid. It is found in various plants from the genus Lagochilus, most notably Lagochilus inebrians, and is thought to be responsible for the sedative, hypotensive and hemostatic effects of these plant species.
