= Astragalus squarrosus =

Scientific classification
- Kingdom: Plantae
- Clade: Tracheophytes
- Clade: Angiosperms
- Clade: Eudicots
- Clade: Rosids
- Order: Fabales
- Family: Fabaceae
- Subfamily: Faboideae
- Genus: Astragalus
- Species: A. squarrosus

Binomial name
- Astragalus squarrosus Bunge

Species of legume

Astragalus squarrosus is a species of milkvetch in the family Fabaceae.
