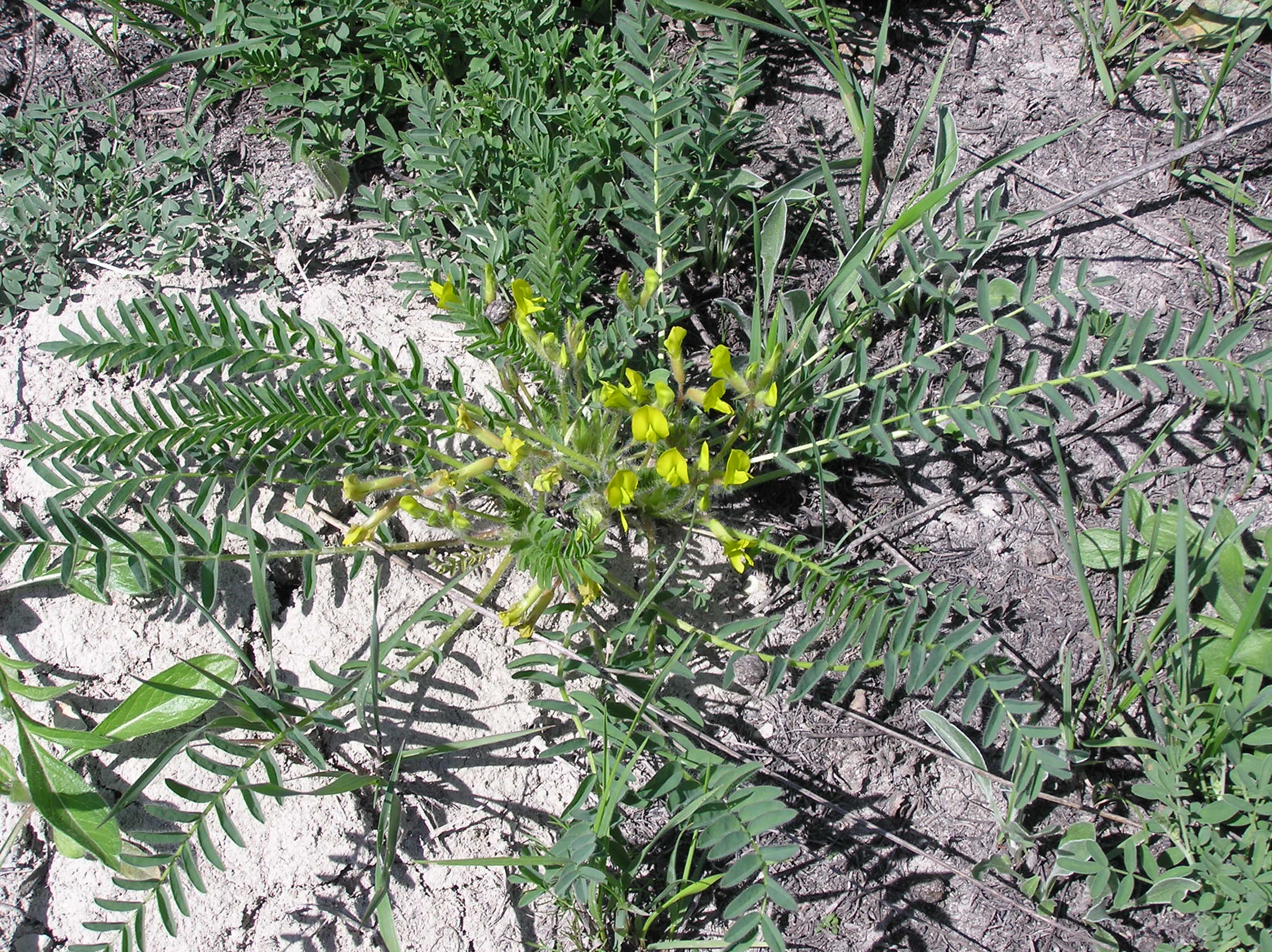

Conservation status
- Least Concern (IUCN 3.1)

Scientific classification
- Kingdom: Plantae
- Clade: Embryophytes
- Clade: Tracheophytes
- Clade: Spermatophytes
- Clade: Angiosperms
- Clade: Eudicots
- Clade: Rosids
- Order: Fabales
- Family: Fabaceae
- Subfamily: Faboideae
- Genus: Astragalus
- Species: A. wolgensis

Binomial name
- Astragalus wolgensis Bunge

Synonyms
- Tragacantha wolgensis (Bunge) Kuntze; Astragalus kungurensis Boriss.

= Astragalus wolgensis =

Species of flowering plant

Astragalus wolgensis is a species of flowering plant in the family Fabaceae. It is a perennial herb native to Russia and Kazakhstan.

The species was described in 1968. The IUCN classifies it as of Least Concern, and it is protected under the Berne Convention.

== Taxonomy ==
Astragalus wolgensis was described by Alexander von Bunge in 1968.

== Distribution ==
The species is native to the temperate biomes of central, east, and south European Russia, western Siberia, and Kazakhstan. It grows in steppes, forest margins, and on chalk and limestone outcrops. It occurs at elevations of up to 400 metres (1,300 ft).

== Description ==
Astragalus wolgensis is a perennial herb, that lacks an apparent stem.

== Conservation ==
In 2011, the IUCN listed Astragalus wolgensis as of Least Concern, although the species is listed as rare. It is a Strictly Protected Species under the Berne Convention on the Conservation of European Wildlife and Natural Habitats.

Russian populations of Astragalus wolgensis are threatened by mining, fires, over-grazing, and human developments. The species occurs in protected areas.

== Nomenclature ==
In Russian, the species is known as Астрагал волжский (Astragal volzskij).
