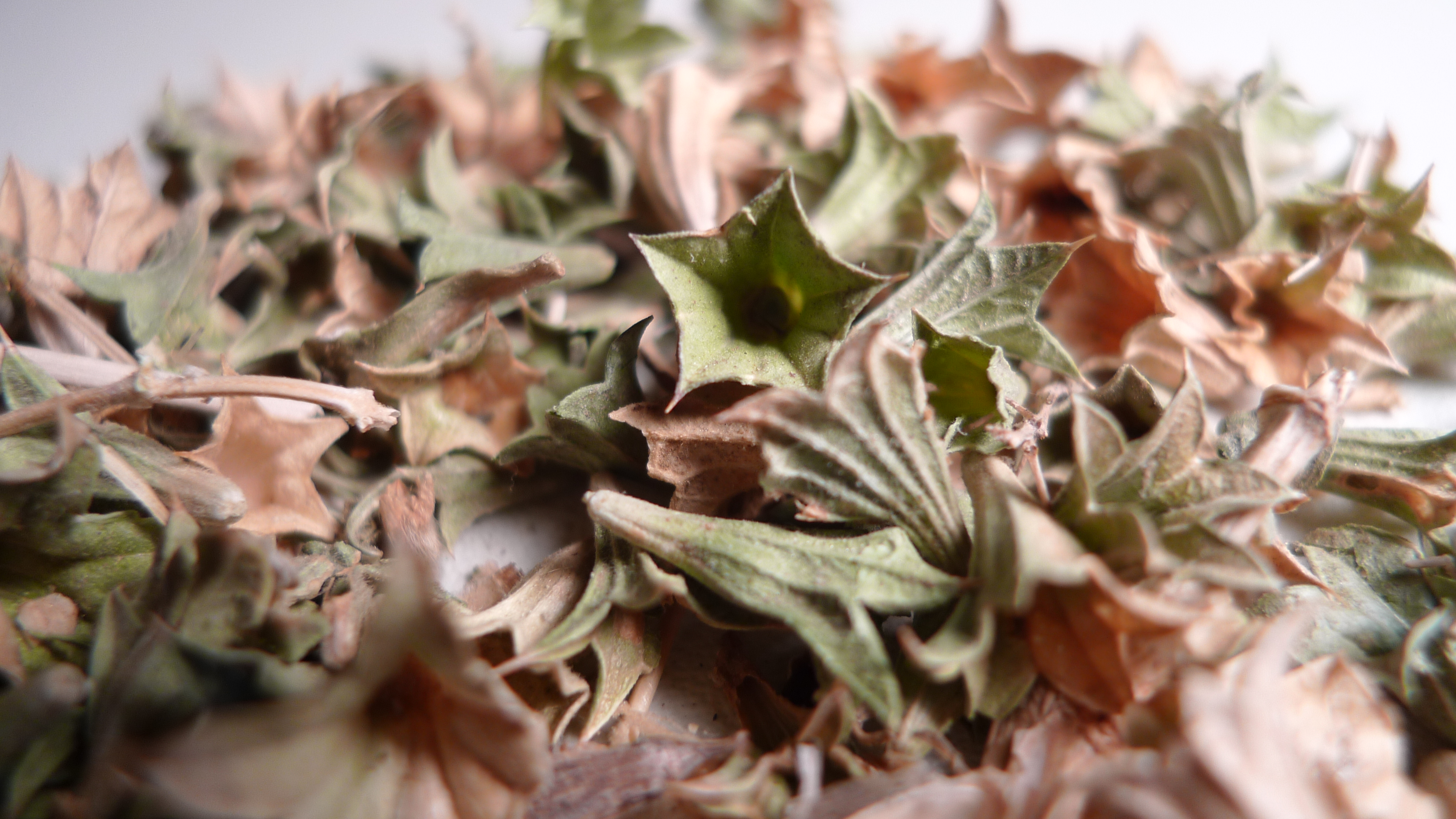
- Dried herbal material consisting mostly of detached spiny calyces

Scientific classification
- Kingdom: Plantae
- Clade: Tracheophytes
- Clade: Angiosperms
- Clade: Eudicots
- Clade: Asterids
- Order: Lamiales
- Family: Lamiaceae
- Genus: Lagochilus
- Species: L. inebrians

Binomial name
- Lagochilus inebrians Bunge

= Lagochilus inebrians =

Species of flowering plant

Lagochilus inebrians, known in English as inebriating mint, intoxicating mint, or Turkistan mint, and in its native Uzbekistan by the Uzbek name Bozulbang, is a member of the mint family, Lamiaceae. The genus name Lagochilus is derived from the Greek elements λαγός (lagos) "hare" and χείλος (ch(e)ilos) "lip" (in reference to the distinctive shape of the corolla), while the Latin specific name inebrians signifies "intoxicating" — in reference to the use of the plant (in its native Central Asia) to prepare a mildly intoxicating tea (see below).

Lagochilus inebrians is widely distributed in the Samarkand and Bukhara provinces of Uzbekistan. It is also found in some areas of Turkmenistan and Tajikistan. It grows on the piedmont plains and low foothills, dried up streams and rubbly slopes, on scree and gravel, and in dry grassy-sagebrush and grassland steppes.

== Taxonomy ==
Lagochilus inebrians is a member of the family Lamiaceae, which contains many well-known culinary herbs such as mint, sage and oregano. Within the Lamiaceae, the genus Lagochilus belongs to tribe Leonureae (named for the genus Leonurus, the motherworts) which belongs, in turn, to subfamily Lamioideae (named for the deadnettle genus Lamium). The distribution of tribe Leonureae accords well with its circumscription, the six genera of which it is comprised being distributed primarily in Central Asia. In addition to the genus Lagochilus, the tribe contains the genera Chaiturus, Leonurus, Panzerina, Loxocalyx and Lagopsis. Of these, Leonurus contains a species, L. sibiricus, which, like Lagochilus inebrians is both medicinal and mildly psychoactive, being smoked occasionally as a Cannabis substitute.

== Description ==
Lagochilus inebrians is a small shrub of globular habit, bearing numerous stems reaching a height of 20–80 centimetres (10–30 in), woody at the base, simple or branched, leafy, the upper parts pubescent, the lower covered with white shiny bark. Leaves opposite, broadly ovate, 3 to 5-partite, bearing scattered hairs and glands on both upper and lower surfaces. Flowers borne in axils of upper leaves. Corolla white or pale pink with brown veins. Calyx pubescent and widely campanulate with five spine-tipped lobes. Fruits seed-like, naked, brown nutlets. Flowers borne May–June and fruits ripening August–September.

== Harvesting and preparation ==
Herbal material from L. inebrians is harvested during the flowering period by beveling the plants with sickles, or by cutting them with shears at a height of about 5 centimetres (2 in) from the ground. When harvesting L. inebrians — 1–2 fruiting plants are left untouched for every 5 square metres (50 sq ft) to ensure their renewal. For normal regrowth and replenishment of this species, the harvesting of flower and leaf on a particular site is allowed no more than once every 2–3 years, sites being harvested in rotation. Drying of the harvested material is carried out in shade for 5–6 days, with occasional stirring. The flowers, with their spiny calyces, and the leaves are then separated from the dry stems by shaking, so that they settle naturally at the bottom of the mass under the influence of gravity. The leaves and flowers so harvested are then stored in dry, well-ventilated conditions. This dried form of L. inebrians, collected during its flowering period, is used as a medicinal product and as a raw material - this consisting of a mixture of flowers (the bulk of which consists of the spine-tipped calyces) and also a certain number of small leaves and thin stalks of green or dark-brownish color.

== Chemistry ==
Dried material of L. inebrians harvested in the traditional manner described above and subsequently offered for sale in trade, contains the diterpene lagochilin, essential oils, tannins, organic acids, carotene, ascorbic acid, calcium, iron, and other compounds.

== Uses ==
In the ethnobotany of Central Asia, L. inebrians features as the source of a mildly psychoactive tea with tranquillising effects, used for recreational purposes and also in the folk medicine of the region as a styptic.
