= Hyalolaena =

Scientific classification
- Kingdom: Plantae
- Clade: Tracheophytes
- Clade: Angiosperms
- Clade: Eudicots
- Clade: Asterids
- Order: Apiales
- Family: Apiaceae
- Subfamily: Apioideae
- Tribe: Pyramidoptereae
- Genus: Hyalolaena; Bunge

Genus of plants

Hyalolaena is a genus of flowering plants belonging to the family Apiaceae.

Its native range is Iran to Xinjiang and Afghanistan.

Species:

- Hyalolaena bupleuroides (Schrenk) Pimenov & Kljuykov
- Hyalolaena intermedia Pimenov & Kljuykov
- Hyalolaena issykkulensis Pimenov & Kljuykov
- Hyalolaena jaxartica Bunge
- Hyalolaena lipskyi (Korovin) Pimenov & Kljuykov
- Hyalolaena transcaspica (Korovin) Pimenov & Kljuykov
- Hyalolaena trichophylla (Schrenk) Pimenov & Kljuykov
- Hyalolaena tschuiliensis (Pavlov) Pimenov & Kljuykov
- Hyalolaena zhang-minglii Lyskov & Kljuykov
