= Allium bungei =

Scientific classification
- Kingdom: Plantae
- Clade: Tracheophytes
- Clade: Angiosperms
- Clade: Monocots
- Order: Asparagales
- Family: Amaryllidaceae
- Subfamily: Allioideae
- Genus: Allium
- Species: A. bungei

Binomial name
- Allium bungei Boiss.

Species of flowering plant

Allium bungei is a species of flowering plant belonging to the family Amaryllidaceae.

It is native to Iran.

The species is named after Russian botanist Alexander von Bunge.
