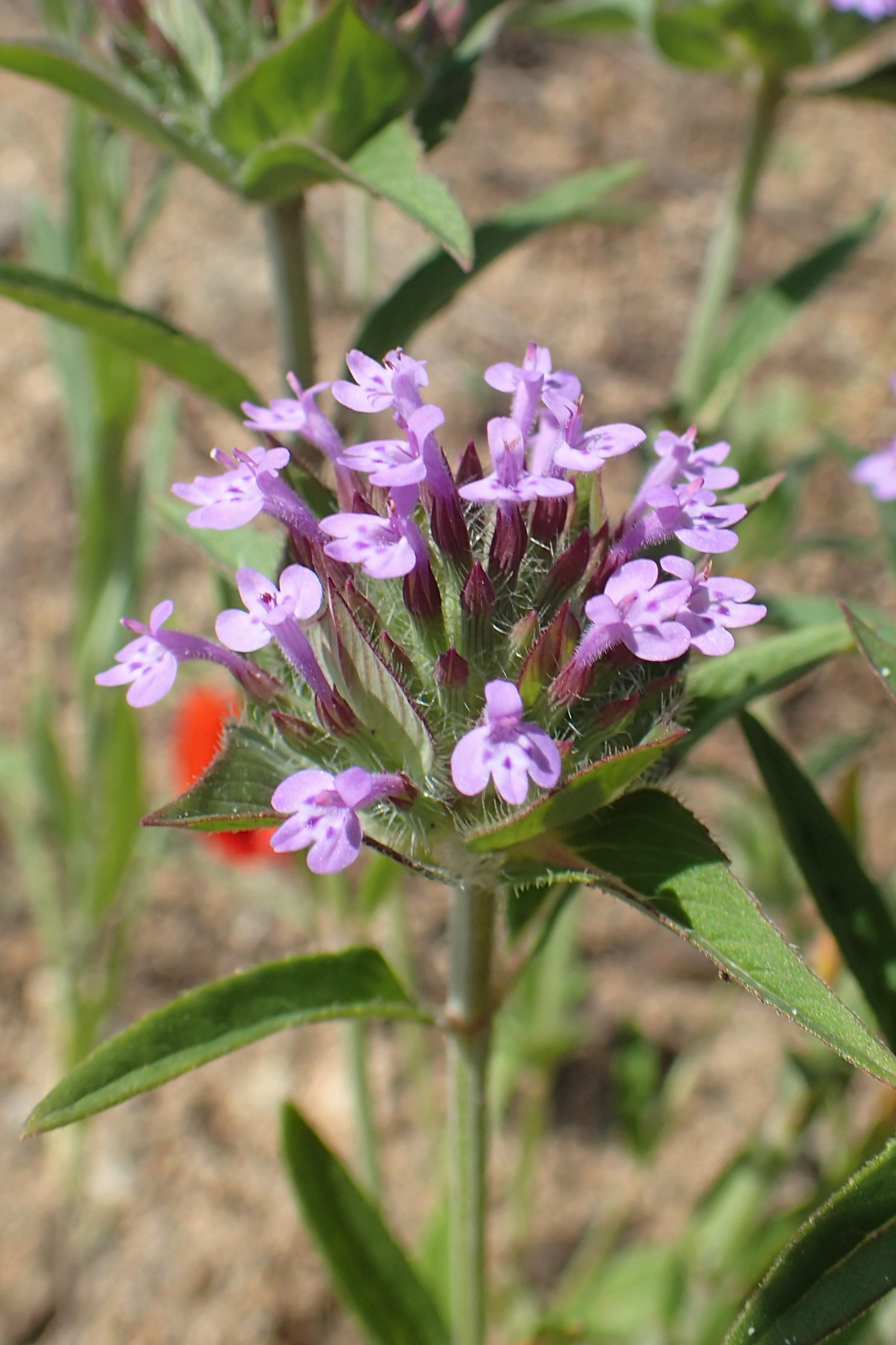
- Ziziphopra capitata in Kapan, Armenia

Scientific classification
- Kingdom: Plantae
- Clade: Tracheophytes
- Clade: Angiosperms
- Clade: Eudicots
- Clade: Asterids
- Order: Lamiales
- Family: Lamiaceae
- Genus: Ziziphora
- Species: Z. capitata

Binomial name
- Ziziphora capitata L.

= Ziziphora capitata =

Species of plant

Ziziphora capitata is an annual herb in the family Lamiaceae. It grows from the Mediterranean basin to Iran including the Sinai, Palestine, Lebanon, Syria, Turkey, Cyprus, the Balkans, southern Russia, the Caucasus, and northern Iraq.

== Description ==
Ziziphora capitata grows from 3 to 12 cm high with simple or branched stems. The aromatic leaves are covered with fine hairs. The lower leaves are from 1 to 2.5 cm long and 0.5 to 0.8 cm wide, linear-lanceolate to elliptic blades and the upper floral leaves are rhombic-ovate. The flowers are tubular, with violet, purple or pink corolla. Flowers are arranged in a globose terminal head, subtended by rhombic-ovate bracts.

== Subspecies and varieties ==
- Ziziphora capitata var. capitata
- Ziziphora capitata var. alba
- Ziziphora capitata subsp. orientalis
