= Friedrich Georg von Bunge =

Baltic German legal historian

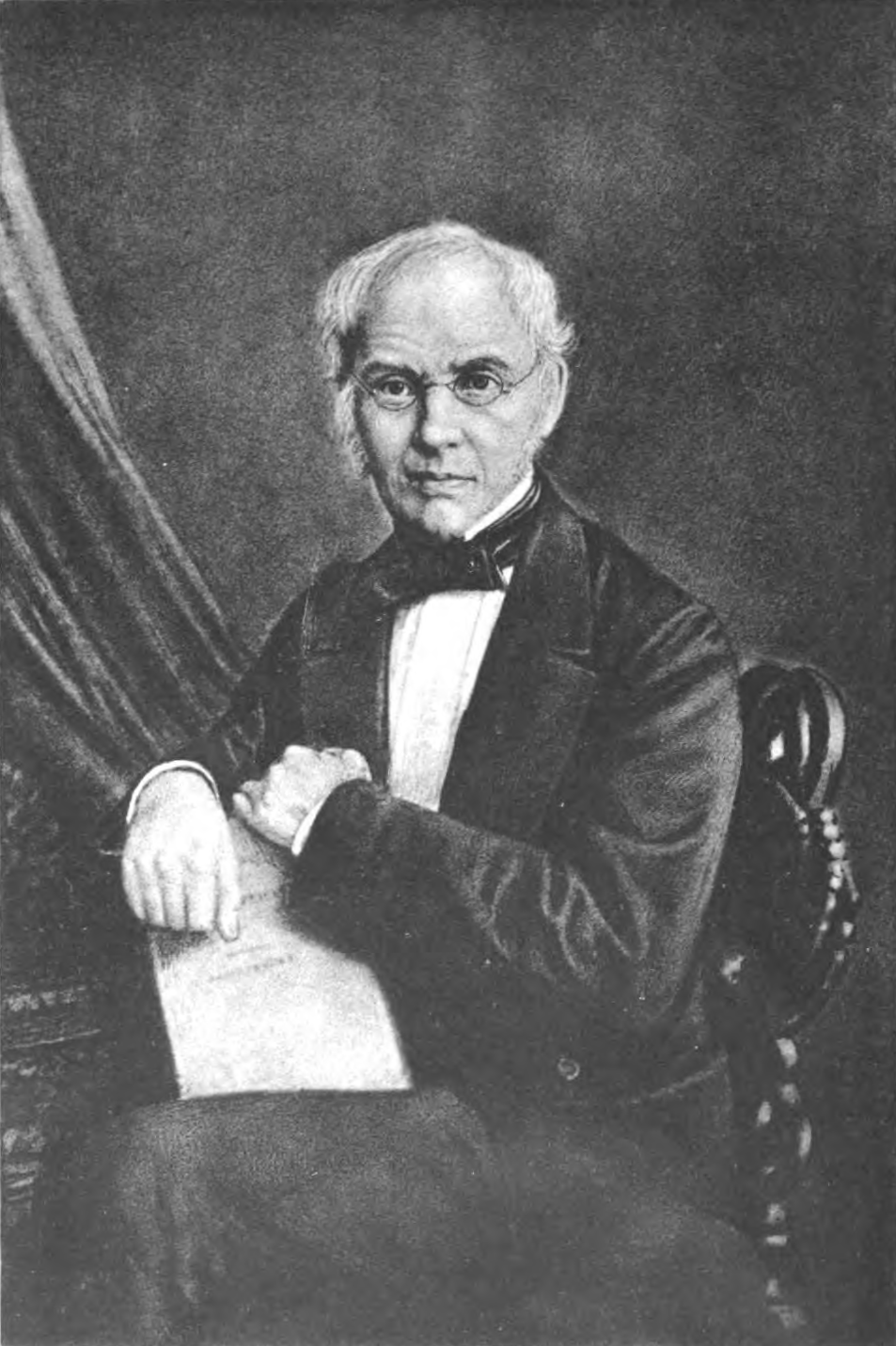
Friedrich Georg von Bunge (1802-1897)

Friedrich Georg von Bunge (13 March 1802, Kiev – 9 April 1897, Wiesbaden) was a Baltic German legal historian. He was the older brother of botanist Alexander Bunge (1803-1890).

From 1819 he studied jurisprudence at the Imperial University of Dorpat, where he attained his habilitation as a lecturer in 1823. In 1831 he became an associate professor of jurisprudence. In 1842 he relocated to Reval, where he served as Syndikus, then moving to St. Petersburg, where from 1856 to 1865, he worked as a senior official in the second division of the Registry to the Emperor. Afterwards he lived and worked in Gotha (from 1865) and Wiesbaden (from 1878).

== Works ==
Known for his scientific handing of local private law, he was acclaimed as compiler of the Baltic Private Law Code (BPLC). The following are a few of his many writings:

- Einleitung in die liv-, esth- und curländische Rechtsgeschichte und Geschichte der Rechtsquellen, 1849 - Introduction to Livonian, Estonian and Courlandian legal history and the history of legal sources.
- Die Revaler Rathslinie : nebst Geschichte der Rathsverfassung und einem Anhange über Riga und Dorpat, 1874 - Reval Rathlinie: with a history of Rath constitution and an appendix on Riga and Dorpat
- Geschichte des Gerichtswesens und Gerichtsverfahrens in Liv-, Est- und Curland, 1874 - History of the court system and court proceedings in Livonia, Estonia and Courland.
- Das herzogthum Estland unter den königen von Dänemark, 1877 - The Duchy of Estonia among the kings of Denmark.
- Die Stadt Riga im dreizehnten und vierzehnten Jahrhundert. Geschichte, Verfassung und Rechtszustand, 1878 - The city of Riga in the thirteenth and fourteenth centuries, etc.

== Sources ==
- "Бунге, Фридрих-Георг" . Brockhaus and Efron Encyclopedic Dictionary (in Russian). 1906.
