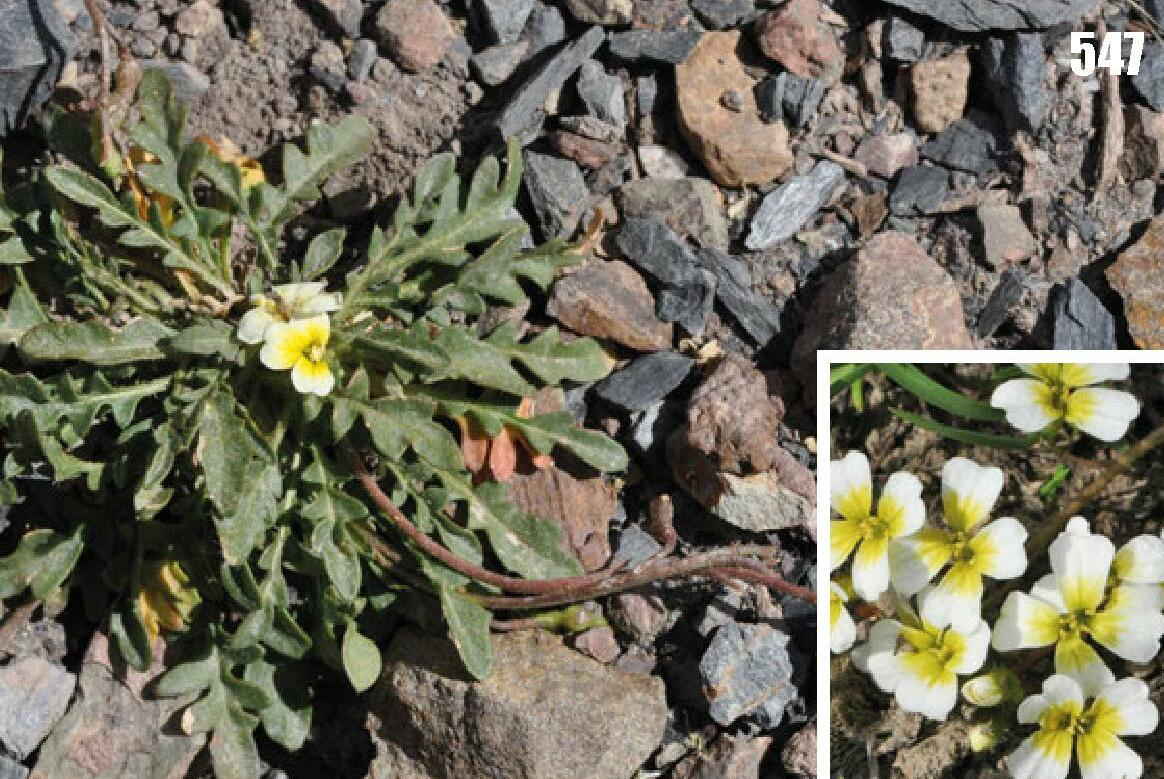

Scientific classification
- Kingdom: Plantae
- Clade: Tracheophytes
- Clade: Angiosperms
- Clade: Eudicots
- Clade: Rosids
- Order: Brassicales
- Family: Brassicaceae
- Genus: Chorispora
- Species: C. sabulosa

Binomial name
- Chorispora sabulosa Cambess.

Synonyms
- Chorispermum elegans Kuntze; Chorispora elegans Cambess.; Chorispora elegans var. eglandulosa Narayanswamy ex H.B.Naithani & Uniyal; Chorispora elegans var. sabulosa (Cambess.) O.E.Schulz

= Chorispora sabulosa =

Species of flowering plant

Chorispora sabulosa is a species of flowering plant in the genus Chorispora. It is a perennial native to subalpine regions of Central Asia, northern Pakistan, the western Himalayas, and Tibet.
