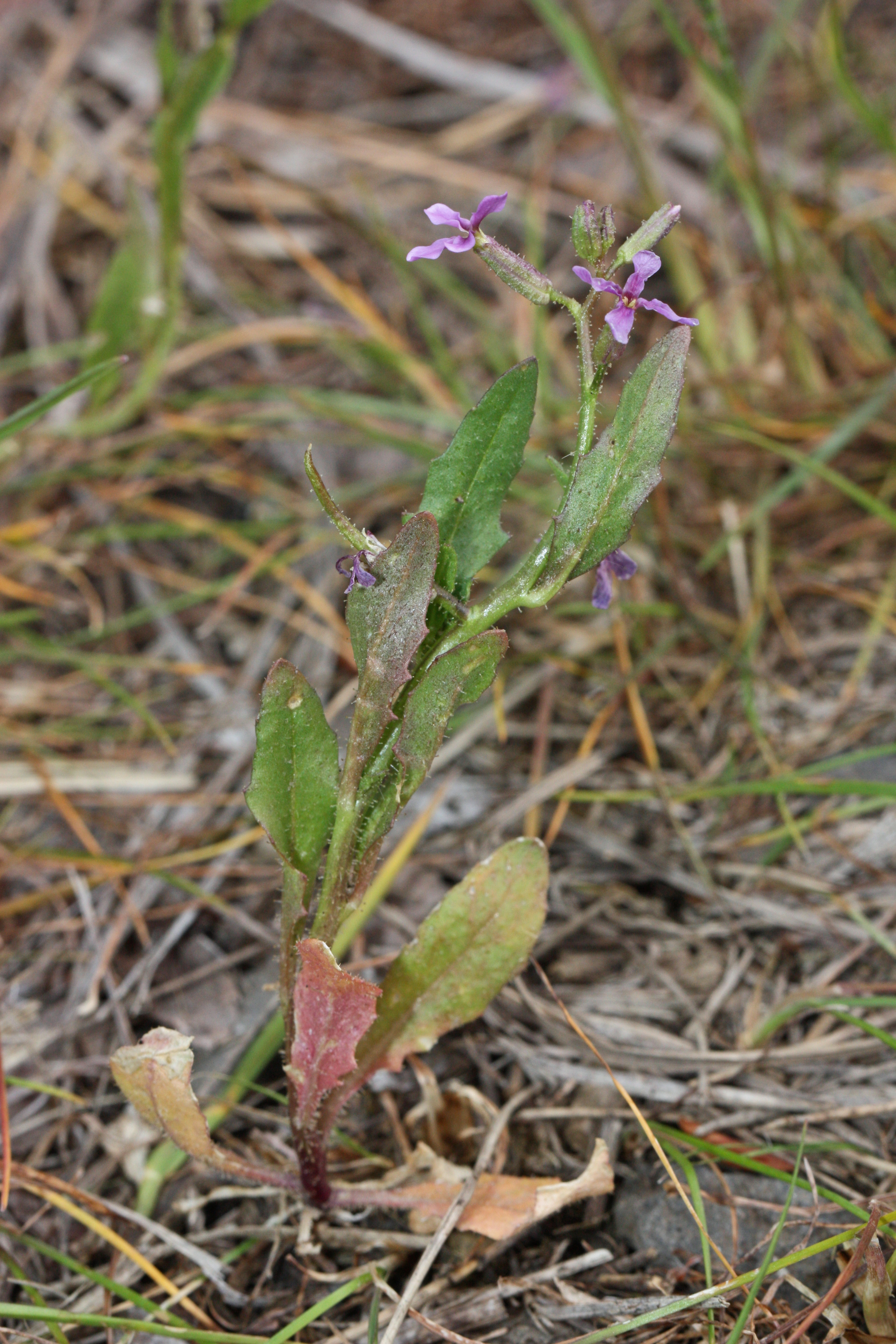

Scientific classification
- Kingdom: Plantae
- Clade: Tracheophytes
- Clade: Angiosperms
- Clade: Eudicots
- Clade: Rosids
- Order: Brassicales
- Family: Brassicaceae
- Genus: Chorispora
- Species: C. tenella

Binomial name
- Chorispora tenella (Pall.) DC.

= Chorispora tenella =

Species of flowering plant

Chorispora tenella is a species of flowering plant in the mustard family known by several common names, including purple mustard, blue mustard, musk mustard, and crossflower. This mustard is native to parts of Eurasia but is well known in other parts of the world, particularly in temperate regions, as an introduced species and a noxious weed.

== Description ==
This is an annual herb reaching a maximum of half a meter in height. It has wavy-edged alternate leaves of lanceolate or oblanceolate shape of up to 8 centimeters long, and glandular hairs are typically observed on most parts of the plant. The four tiny petals of each cruciform flower emerge from a loose tube of sepals and spread into a corolla about a centimeter wide. The flowers are lavender to pale magenta in color, and a field heavily infested with purple mustard can take on a distinct lavender wash. The flowers have a light scent—more noticeable when many individual plants are blooming together in a large area—which is considered unpleasant by some and fragrant by others. The fruits are long upturned cylindrical capsules about 4 centimeters long containing round, reddish-brown seeds that eventually burst from the fruit pods.

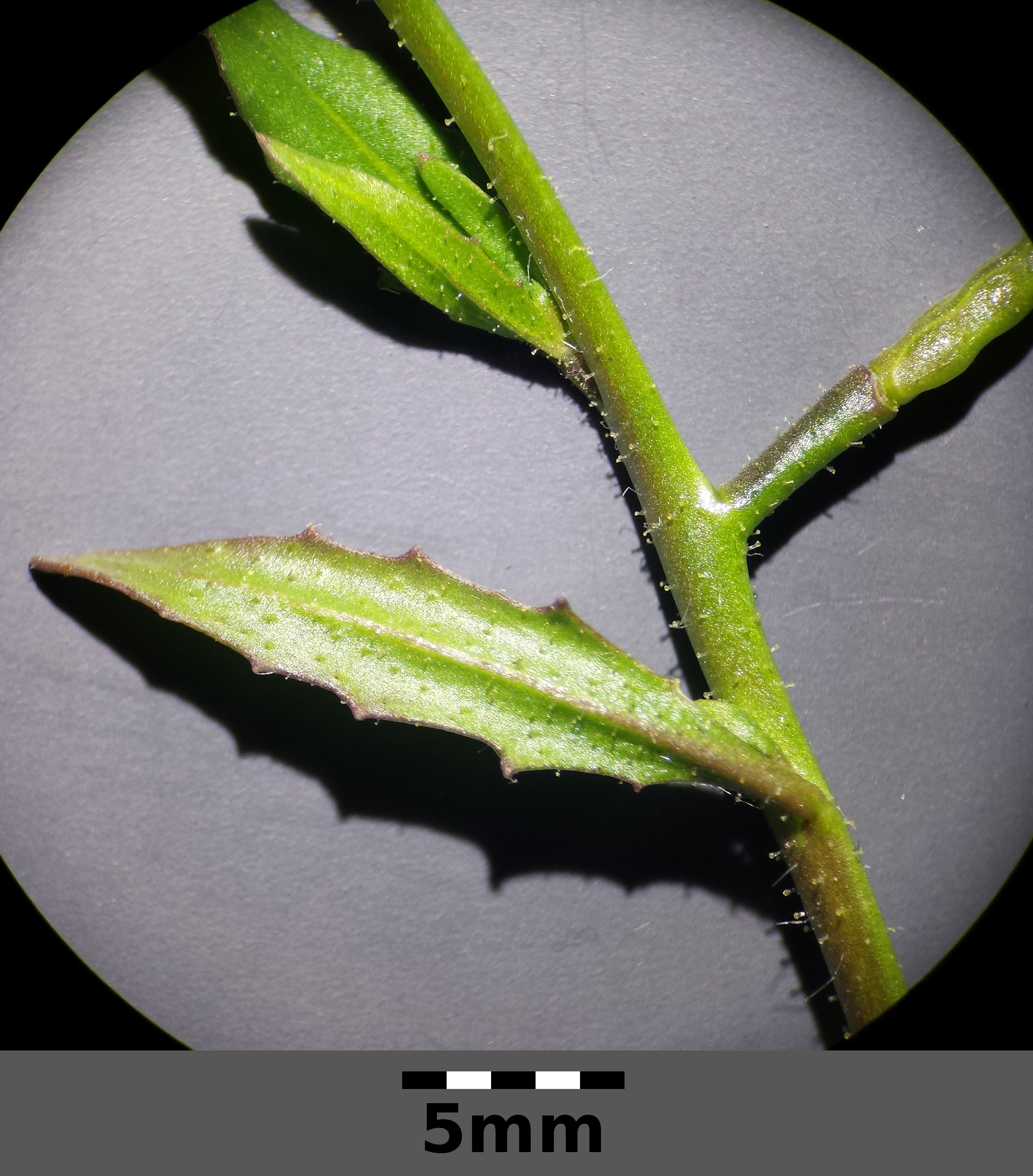
Chorispora tenella stem and leaf

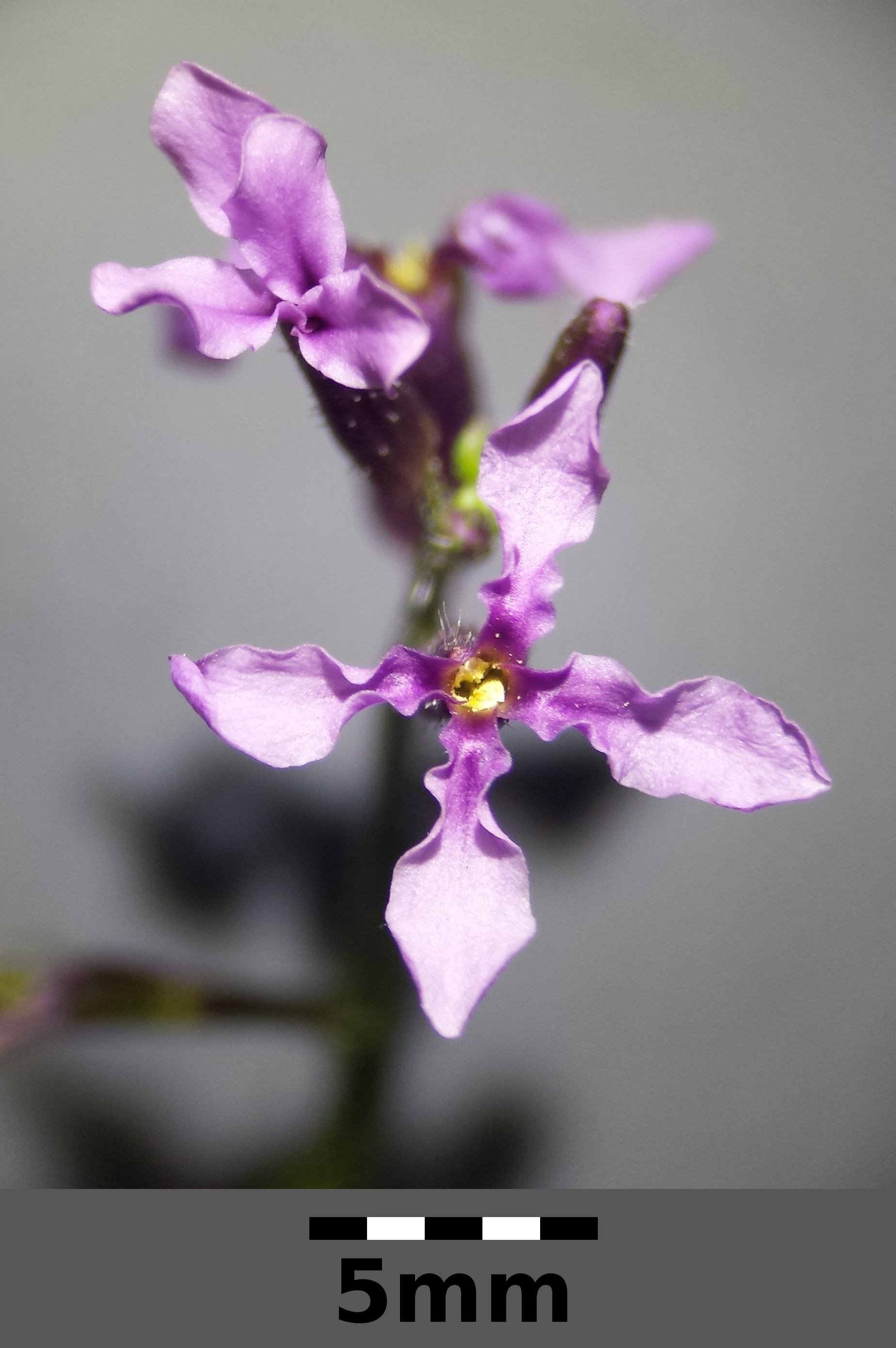
Cruciform Chorispora tenella flowers

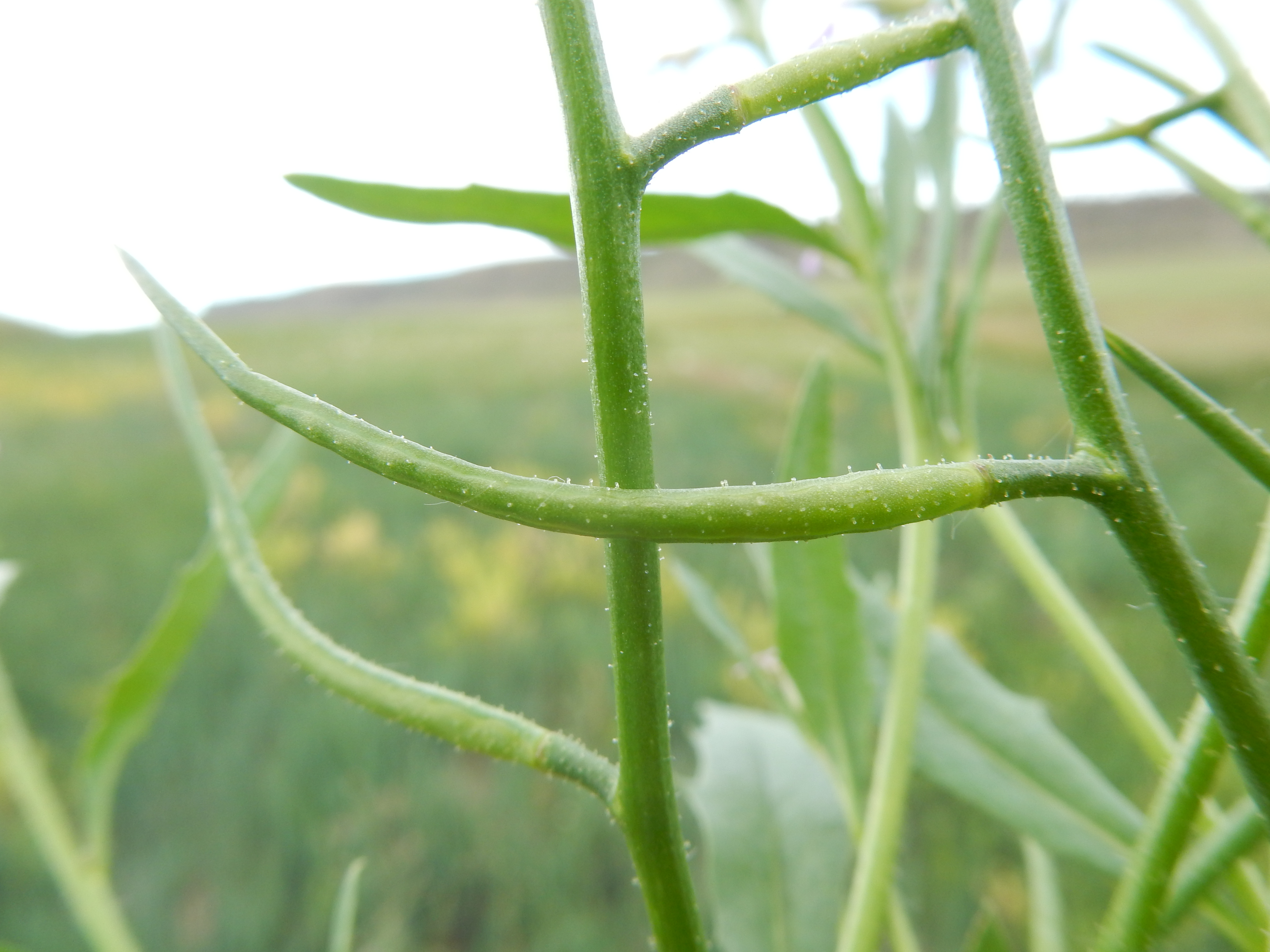
The fruit (seed pod) of Chorispora tenella

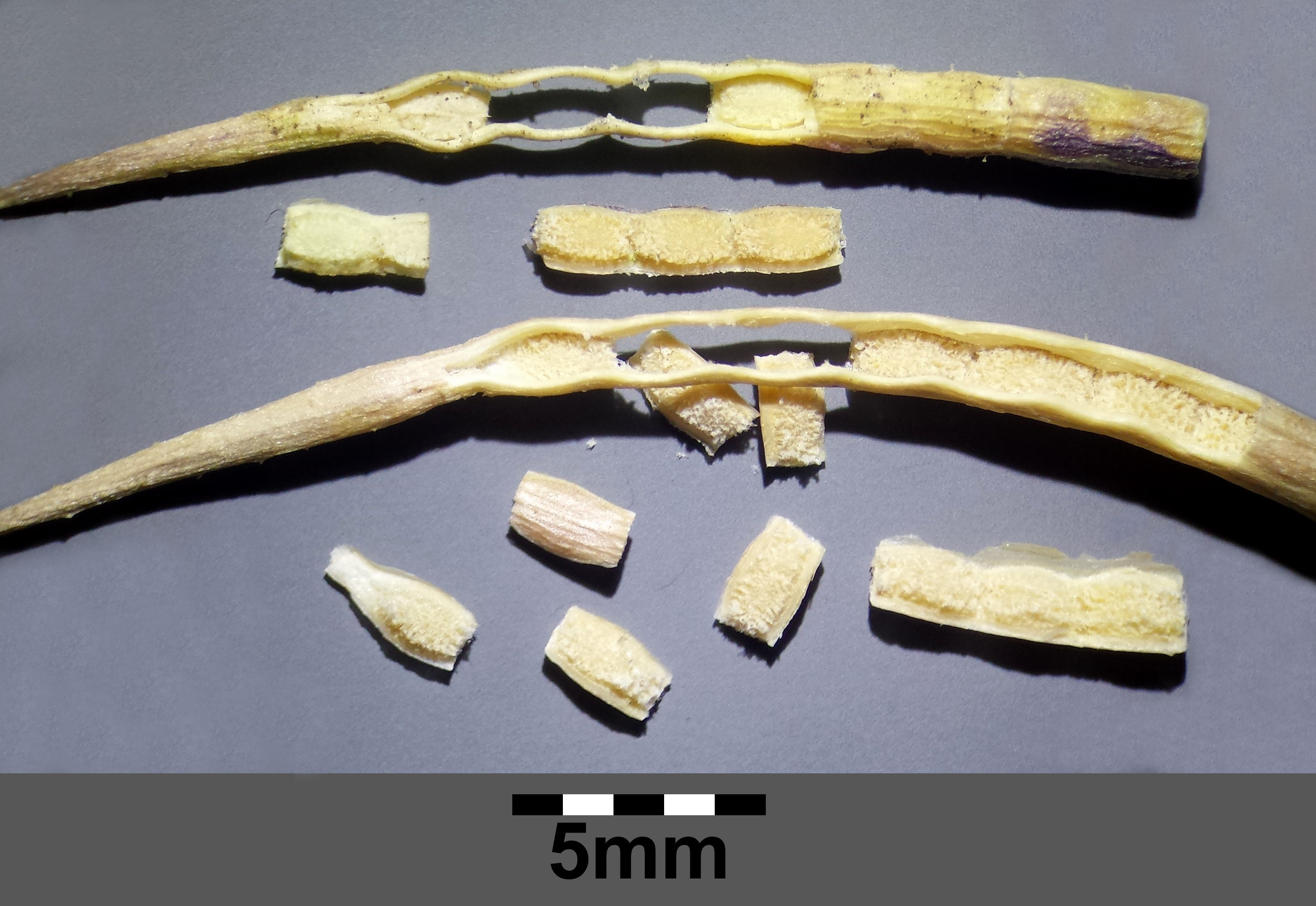
The dried and emptied fruit of Chorispora tenella

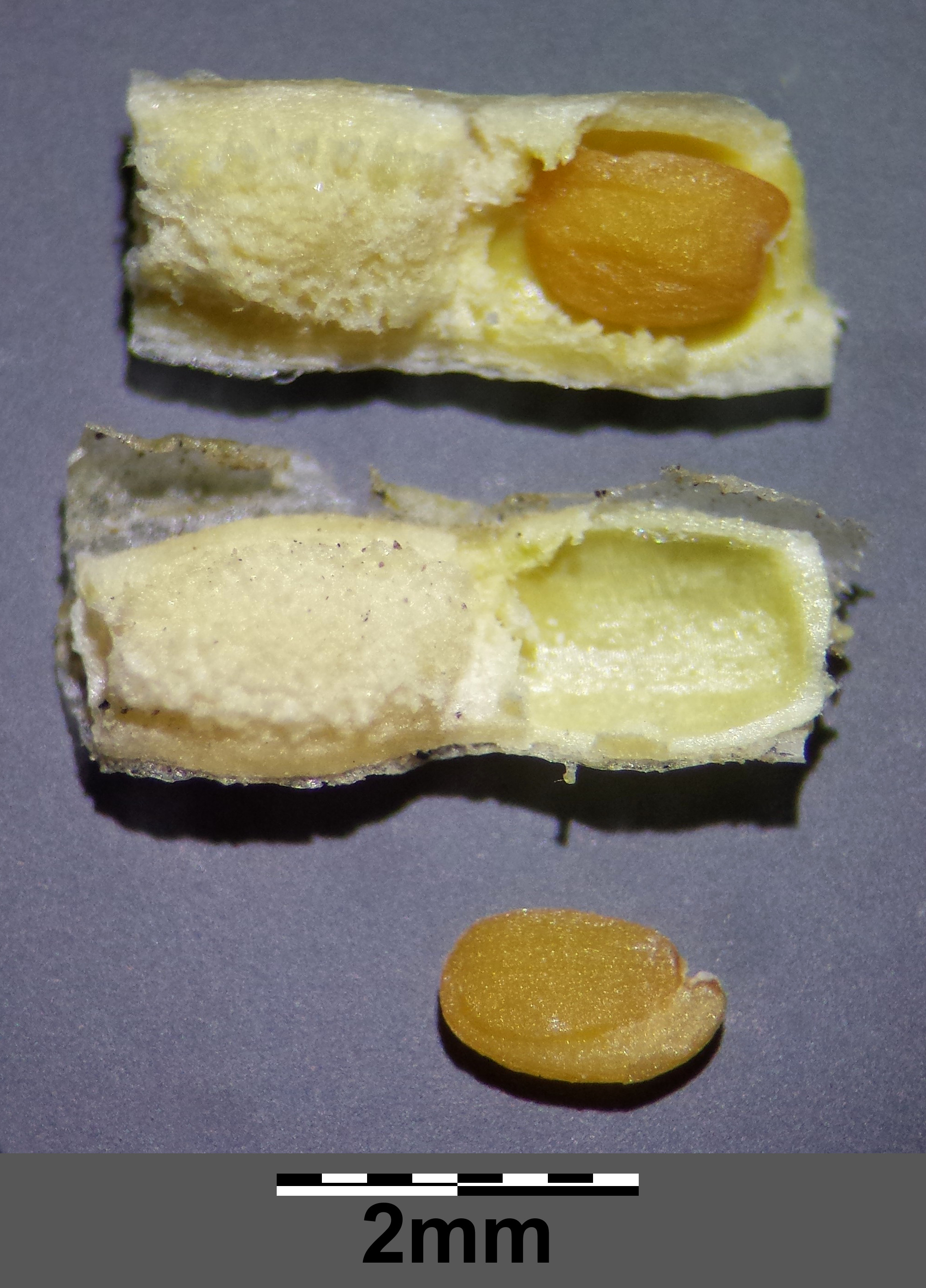
Seeds ofChorispora tenella

== Etymology of name ==
According to the Rocky Mountain Biological Laboratory, the word origin of the scientific name for this species is as follows:

The Greek "Chori", "separate", and " spora", "seed", refers to the constricted seed shape. "Tenella" means slender and could refer to the overall plant or flower or seed shape, all of which are slender. The plant was named Raphanus tenellus in 1776 by Peter von Pallas (1741–1811) from Eurasian specimens and was renamed Chorispora tenella in 1821 by Augustin Pyramus de Candolle (1778–1841). It was first collected [in the United States] in Utah in 1937.

== Invasiveness ==
This is a tenacious weed which can be troublesome in agriculture. It reduces yields in grain fields and when it is consumed by dairy cattle it gives their milk a bad taste and odor. This plant reproduces by seed, so any control method preventing the plants from setting seed is effective.

Outside of its native range, this species commonly occurs in areas where the soil has been disturbed, as well as along roadways, in pastures, and in steppe habitats.
