= Girgensohnia bungeana =

Scientific classification
- Kingdom: Plantae
- Clade: Tracheophytes
- Clade: Angiosperms
- Clade: Eudicots
- Order: Caryophyllales
- Family: Amaranthaceae
- Genus: Girgensohnia
- Species: G. bungeana

Binomial name
- Girgensohnia bungeana Sukhor.

Species of plant

Girgensohnia bungeana is a species of flowering plant belonging to the family Amaranthaceae.

It is native to Iran to Central Asia.
