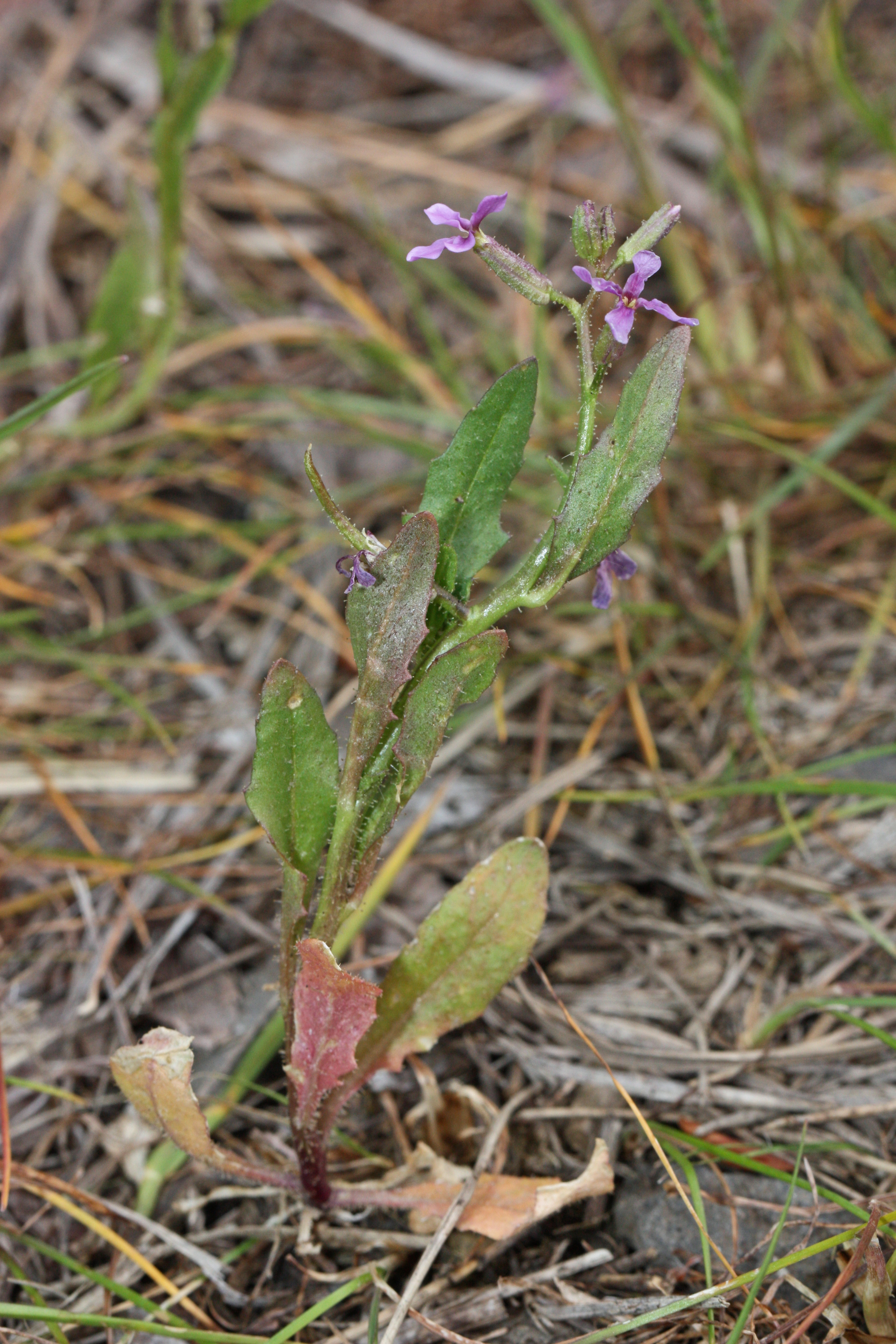
- Chorispora tenella

Scientific classification
- Kingdom: Plantae
- Clade: Tracheophytes
- Clade: Angiosperms
- Clade: Eudicots
- Clade: Rosids
- Order: Brassicales
- Family: Brassicaceae
- Genus: Chorispora; R.Br. ex DC.

Species
- See text

Synonyms
- Chorispermum W.T.Aiton

= Chorispora =

Genus of flowering plants

Chorispora is a genus of plant in the family Brassicaceae. It includes 13 species native to Eurasia, ranging from southeastern Europe to the Arabian Peninsula, China, and Siberia.

Chorispora tenella, known by several common names, including purple mustard, blue mustard, musk mustard, and crossflower is native to Eurasia but is well known in other parts of the world, particularly in temperate regions, as an introduced species and a noxious weed.

== Species ==
13 species are accepted.

- Chorispora bungeana Fisch. & C.A. Mey.
- Chorispora gracilis Ernst
- Chorispora greigii Regel
- Chorispora iberica (M.Bieb.) DC.
- Chorispora insignis Pachom.
- Chorispora macropoda Trautv.
- Chorispora persica Boiss.
- Chorispora purpurascens (Banks & Sol.) Eig
- Chorispora sabulosa Cambess.
- Chorispora sibirica (L.) DC.
- Chorispora songarica Schrenk
- Chorispora tashkorganica Al-Shehbaz, T.Y.Cheo, L.L.Lu & G.Yang
- Chorispora tenella (Pall.) DC.
