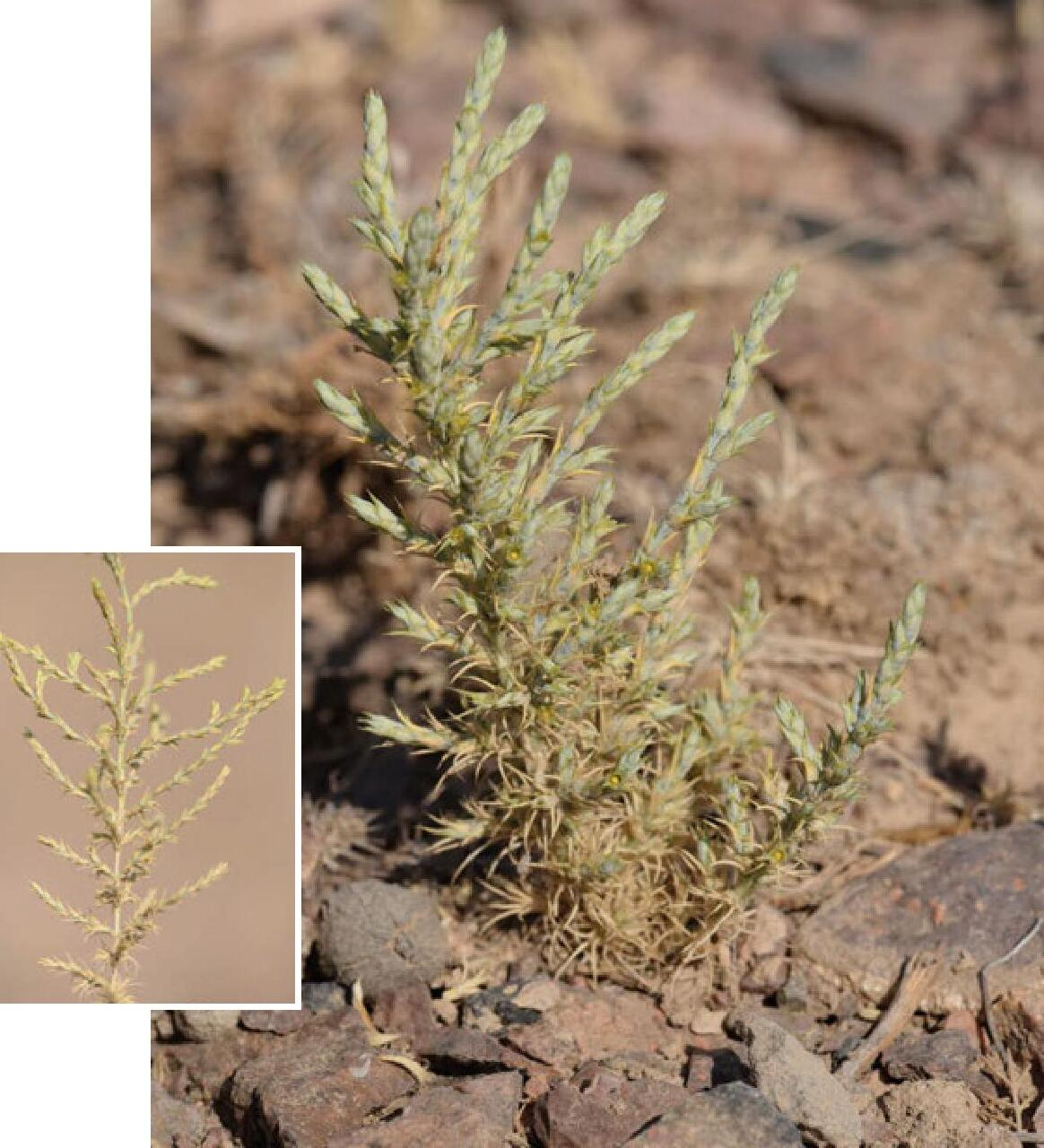
- Girgensohnia oppositiflora

Scientific classification
- Kingdom: Plantae
- Clade: Tracheophytes
- Clade: Angiosperms
- Clade: Eudicots
- Order: Caryophyllales
- Family: Amaranthaceae
- Subfamily: Salsoloideae
- Tribe: Salsoleae
- Genus: Girgensohnia; Bunge ex Fenzl

= Girgensohnia =

Genus of flowering plants

Girgensohnia is a small genus of plants in the family Amaranthaceae. They range from the eastern Mediterranean to the Caucasus, central Asia, Pakistan, and Xinjiang.

Girgensohnia contains five species:

- Girgensohnia bungeana Sukhor.
- Girgensohnia diptera Bunge
- Girgensohnia imbricata Bunge
- Girgensohnia minima Korovin
- Girgensohnia oppositiflora (Pall.) Fenzl
