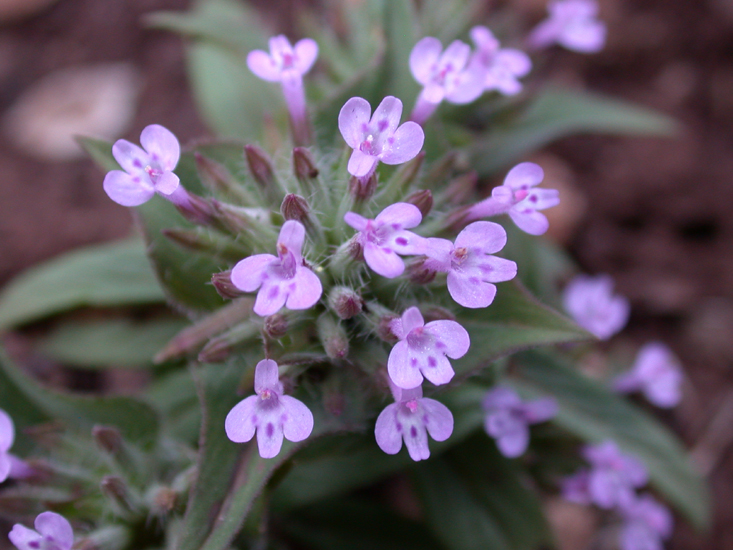
- Ziziphora capitata

Scientific classification
- Kingdom: Plantae
- Clade: Tracheophytes
- Clade: Angiosperms
- Clade: Eudicots
- Clade: Asterids
- Order: Lamiales
- Family: Lamiaceae
- Subfamily: Nepetoideae
- Tribe: Mentheae
- Genus: Ziziphora; L.

Synonyms
- Faldermannia Trautv.; Zwingeria Heist. ex Fabr.

= Ziziphora =

Genus of plants

Ziziphora are a genus of annual or perennial herbs or subshrubs in the family Lamiaceae. Ziziphora has aromatic leaves; they are found in open and often xeric habitats in Southern and Eastern Europe, North-West Africa and Asia to the Himalayas and Altai Mountains.

== Distribution ==
- Southwestern Europe
- Southeastern Europe
- Eastern Europe
- Northern Africa
- Macaronesia
- Siberia
- Middle Asia
- Caucasus
- Western Asia
- Arabian Peninsula
- China
- Mongolia
- Indian Subcontinent
- Iran (north khorasan)

Species

1. Ziziphora aragonensis Pau - Spain
2. Ziziphora brantii K.Koch - Caucasus
3. Ziziphora capitata L. - Balkans, Black Sea region, Middle East, Central Asia
4. Ziziphora clinopodioides Lam. - Siberia, Mongolia, Xinjiang, Central Asia, Himalayas, Southwest Asia
5. Ziziphora galinae Juz. - Turkmenistan
6. Ziziphora hispanica L. - Spain, Algeria, Morocco, Tunisia
7. Ziziphora interrupta Juz. - Tajikistan
8. Ziziphora pamiroalaica Juz. - Kyrgyzstan, Tajikistan, Xinjiang
9. Ziziphora pedicellata Pazij & Vved. - Kyrgyzstan, Uzbekistan
10. Ziziphora persica Bunge - Iran, Turkey, Caucasus, Crimea, Central Asia
11. Ziziphora puschkinii Adam - Caucasus
12. Ziziphora raddei Juz. - Caucasus
13. Ziziphora suffruticosa Pazij & Vved. - Uzbekistan
14. Ziziphora taurica M.Bieb - Crimea, Turkey, Syria
15. Ziziphora tenuior L. - Ukraine, Russia, Siberia, Central Asia, Xinjiang, Afghanistan, Iran, Turkey, Middle East
16. Ziziphora vichodceviana Tkatsch. ex Tulyag. - Kyrgyzstan
17. Ziziphora woronowii Maleev - Caucasus
