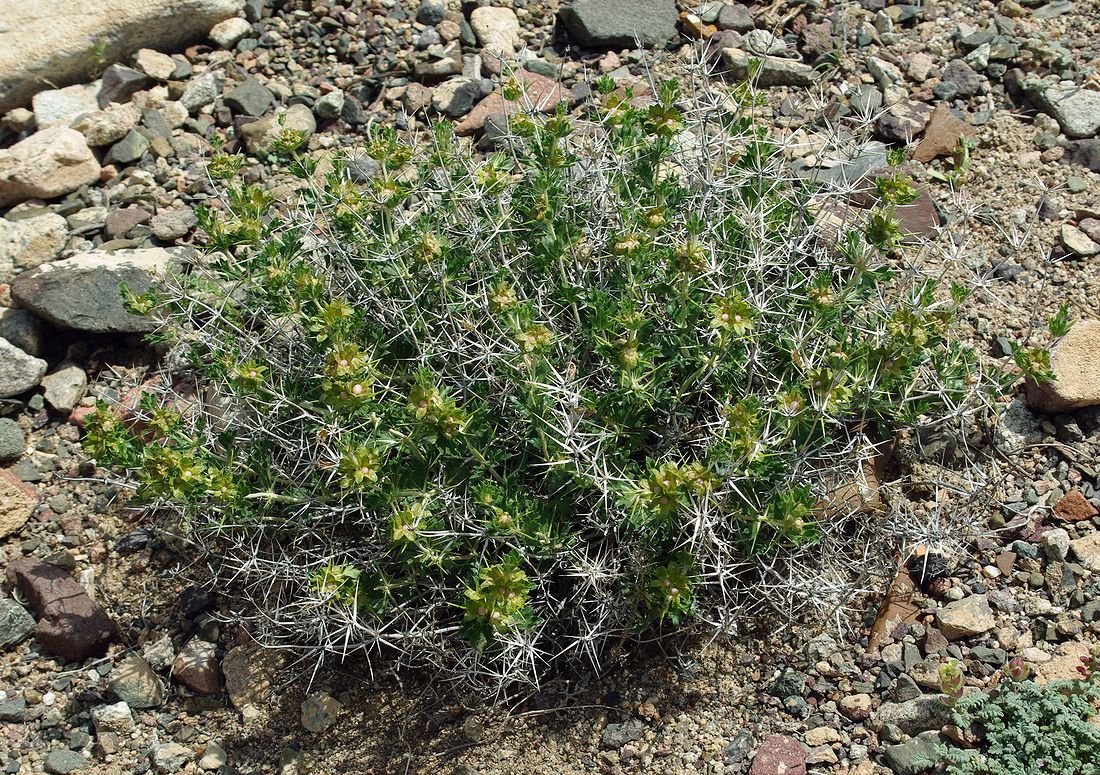
- Lagochilus platyacanthus

Scientific classification
- Kingdom: Plantae
- Clade: Embryophytes
- Clade: Tracheophytes
- Clade: Spermatophytes
- Clade: Angiosperms
- Clade: Eudicots
- Clade: Asterids
- Order: Lamiales
- Family: Lamiaceae
- Subfamily: Lamioideae
- Genus: Lagochilus; Bunge ex Benth.

Synonyms
- Yermoloffia Bél.; Chlainanthus Briq.; Lagochilopsis Knorring

= Lagochilus =

Genus of flowering plants

Lagochilus is a genus of the mint family that contains Turkistan mint (Lagochilus inebrians). It is native to central, south-central, and eastern Asia (Iran, Pakistan, Kazakhstan, Mongolia, China, etc.).

== Etymology of genus name ==
The genus name Lagochilus is derived from the Greek elements λαγός (lagos) "hare" and χείλος (ch(e)ilos) "lip" (in reference to a perceived resemblance between the shape of the corolla and the cleft lip of a hare).

Species

- Lagochilus acutilobus (Ledeb.) Fisch. & C.A.Mey. — Kazakhstan, Uzbekistan
- Lagochilus alutaceus Bunge — Iran
- Lagochilus androssowii Knorring — Kazakhstan
- Lagochilus aucheri Boiss. — Iran
- Lagochilus balchanicus Czerniak. — Turkmenistan
- Lagochilus botschantzevii Kamelin & Tzukerv. — Tajikistan, Uzbekistan
- Lagochilus bungei Benth. — Kazakhstan, Xinjiang, Mongolia
- Lagochilus cabulicus Benth. — Caucasus, Iran, Afghanistan, Pakistan, western Himalayas of northern India, Turkmenistan
- Lagochilus cuneatus Benth. — Afghanistan, Pakistan
- Lagochilus diacanthophyllus (Pall.) Benth. — Kazakhstan, Uzbekistan, Kyrgyzstan, Xinjiang
- Lagochilus drobovii Kamelin & Tzukerv. — Kyrgyzstan
- Lagochilus grandiflorus C.Y.Wu & S.J.Hsuan — Xinjiang
- Lagochilus gypsaceus Vved. — Tajikistan, Uzbekistan, Turkmenistan
- Lagochilus hindukushi Kamelin & Gubanov — Afghanistan
- Lagochilus hirsutissimus Vved — Uzbekistan, Kyrgyzstan, Tajikistan
- Lagochilus hirtus Fisch. & C.A.Mey. — Kazakhstan, Xinjiang
- Lagochilus hispidus (Bél.) Fisch. & C.A.Mey. — Iran
- Lagochilus ilicifolius Bunge ex Benth. — Tuva Republic in Russia, Mongolia, Gansu, Inner Mongolia, Ningxia, Shaanxi
- Lagochilus inebrians Bunge — Tajikistan, Uzbekistan, Turkmenistan
- Lagochilus kaschgaricus Rupr. — Kazakhstan, Kyrgyzstan, Xinjiang
- Lagochilus knorringianus Pavlov — Kazakhstan, Uzbekistan, Kyrgyzstan, Tajikistan
- Lagochilus kschtutensis Knorring — Tajikistan
- Lagochilus lanatonodus C.Y.Wu & S.J.Hsuan — Xinjiang
- Lagochilus leiacanthus Fisch. & C.A.Mey. — Xinjiang, Kazakhstan
- Lagochilus longidentatus Knorring — Kazakhstan
- Lagochilus macracanthus Fisch. & C.A.Mey. — Iran
- Lagochilus nevskii Knorring — Tajikistan, Uzbekistan
- Lagochilus occultiflorus Rupr. — Kazakhstan, Uzbekistan, Kyrgyzstan
- Lagochilus olgae Kamelin — Uzbekistan
- Lagochilus paulsenii Briq. — Kyrgyzstan, Tajikistan
- Lagochilus platyacanthus Rupr. — Kazakhstan, Kyrgyzstan, Xinjiang, Tajikistan
- Lagochilus platycalyx Schrenk ex Fisch. & C.A.Mey — Kazakhstan, Kyrgyzstan, Uzbekistan, Tajikistan
- Lagochilus proskorjakovii Ikramov — Uzbekistan
- Lagochilus pubescens Vved. — Uzbekistan, Kyrgyzstan, Tajikistan
- Lagochilus pulcher Knorring — Kazakhstan, Kyrgyzstan
- Lagochilus pungens Schrenk — Kazakhstan, Xinjiang, Mongolia
- Lagochilus quadridentatus Jamzad — Iran
- Lagochilus schugnanicus Knorring — Kyrgyzstan, Tajikistan, Pakistan, Afghanistan
- Lagochilus seravschanicus Knorring — Kazakhstan, Tajikistan, Uzbekistan
- Lagochilus setulosus Vved. — Kazakhstan, Uzbekistan
- Lagochilus subhispidus Knorring — Kazakhstan, Uzbekistan
- Lagochilus taukumensis Tzukerv. — Kazakhstan
- Lagochilus turkestanicus Knorring — Uzbekistan, Kyrgyzstan, Tajikistan
- Lagochilus vvedenskyi Kamelin & Tzukerv. — Uzbekistan
- Lagochilus xianjiangensis G.J.Liu - Xinjiang
