= Alexander von Bunge =

Russian botanist (1803–1890)

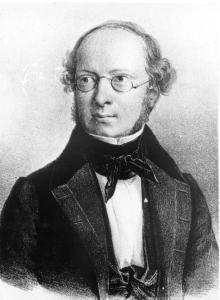
- Lithograph by Eduard Hau, 1839
- Born: Aleksander Andreyevich Bunge; 6 October 1803; Kiev, Russian Empire
- Died: 18 July 1890 (aged 86)
- Education: Imperial University of Dorpat
- Children: Gustav; Alexander
- Parents: Andreas Theodor von Bunge (father); Elisabeth von Bunge (mother)
- Relatives: Friedrich Georg von Bunge (brother)
- Scientific career
- Fields: Botany
- Workplaces: Imperial University of Dorpat; Kazan University
- Thesis: De relatione methodi plantarum naturalis in vires vegetabilium medicalis
- Author abbrev. (botany): Bunge

Alexander Georg von Bunge (Russian: Алекса́ндр Андре́евич Бу́нге, romanized: Aleksander Andreyevich Bunge; 6 October [O.S. 24 September] 1803 – 18 July [O.S. 6 July] 1890) was a Russian botanist. He is best remembered for scientific expeditions into Asia and especially Siberia.

== Early life and education ==
Bunge was born under the name Alexander Andreyevich von Bunge on 6 October [O.S. 24 September] 1803 in Kiev as the second son of a family that belonged to the German minority in Tsarist Russia. His father, Andreas Theodor was a pharmacist who had emigrated from East Prussia to Russia with his grandfather in the 18th century and his mother, Elisabeth von Bunge (née Fuhrmann). They moved to Dorpat in 1815 after his father's death in 1814, and he attended high school from 1818 to 1821. He was educated at Dorpat, where he attended the gymnasium from 1821 to 1825. Then he studied medicine and obtained his doctorate of medicine from the Imperial University of Dorpat in 1825. He also studied botany there under Carl Friedrich von Ledebour and completed his thesis entitled De relatione methodi plantarum naturalis in vires vegetabilium medicalis

== Expedition to Siberia ==
At early January, he worked as the head of metallurgy in the Kolyvan-Voskresensker factory under P. K. Frolov and as district physician in Barnaul (Tomsk Governorate) which located in southern Siberia. The same year he went with Ledebour and Carl Anton von Meyer on an important scientific expedition to the Kazakh Steppe and Altai Mountains. They spent five weeks across Russia to Barnaul during the summer and collected 1,600 plant specimens, which formed the basis of the Flora Altaica. This book was published in four volumes between 1829 and 1833.

After the expedition, Bunge lived in Kolyvan and transferred to Zmeinogorsk until 1830. After recommendation by Alexander von Humboldt, whom Bunge met in 1829 when Humboldt visited Altai, he was given a scientific mission to Peking by the Academy of St.Petersburg. Humboldt was on an expedition financed by Tsar Nicholas. He was accompanied by Colonel Ladijenski as pristav (escort) and Dr. P. Kirilov as physician. Apart from him there were other researchers, including Georg Albert von Fuss as astronomer and metereologist, and Kovanko as mineralogist. All of them were part of the eleventh ecclesiastical mission, which happened regularly, and were also to pick up the emissary for the tenth ecclesiastical mission. They went to Peking from the border town Kjachta at the end of O.S August 1830 via Urga in September 1830, and arrived in Peking on 17 November 1830 after crossing the Gobi Desert, and spent the winter in Peking. Bunge continued his research in March 1831 by going to the ruins known as Tsagan Balgasun located in Khalgan (Zhangjiakou). His research was finally stopped in May 1821 because he incurred the displeasure of the Chinese authorities when he stayed at Buddhist Monastery and did not get permission to go out of Peking

They returned to Russia on 6 July 1831 with the emissary of the tenth ecclesiastical mission by following the western route that bypassed Kalgan and Urga. They arrived in Russia in early September 1831 with their collection of 450 plant specimens. In addition to plants Bunge collected a few beetles, which were described by Franz Faldermann in his book Coleopterorum ab illustrissimo Bungio in China boreali, Mongolia, et Montibus Altaicis collectorum descriptio.

After the expedition Bunge lived in Irkutsk for the rest of the winter. He spent his time in describing his collection. Most of it was saved in the herbarium of the Russian Academy of Sciences in Saint Petersburg and a small part was saved in the herbarium of the University of Halle as part of a herbarium exchange and duplicated what was saved in St. Petersburg. One of the plants that he named is Viburnum fragrans Bunge (later renamed Viburnum farreri Stearn, after William T. Stearn) and also appeared in Enumeratio plantarum quas in China boreali collegit.

In April 1832, Bunge returned to his duties as physician in Barnaul, but not long afterwards he made another expedition of the Russian Academy of Sciences to go to Chuya, located in the eastern Altai mountains. He went to St. Petersburg in 1833 and was nominated as a member of the Russian Academy of Sciences and he also became Professor of Botany in Kazan University. Bunge spent three years at this university, and during this period, he made an expedition to study plants from the Volga steppe before moving back to Dorpat in 1836 to become professor of botany in the University of Dorpat and director of the botanical garden., replacing Ledebour, who had retired.

During his professorship, Bunge made a scientific expedition to Khorasan and Afghanistan in 1857–1858, and another expedition to Persia through Herat in 1858–1859, led by Nikolai Vladímirovich Janykov. On the basis of this expedition, Bunge published a botanical treatise for the Russian Academy of Sciences and became an honorary member of the academy in 1875. He kept in contact with Diederich Franz Leonhard von Schlechtendal, a botanist at the University of Halle, through correspondence, via articles published in the journal "Linnaea" and through the exchange of herbarium specimens. Bunge retired as professor in 1867 and was succeeded by Heinrich Moritz Willkomm. He remained in Dorpat until 1881, spending his later years there investigating Estonian flora. Bunge edited the exsiccata Flora exsiccata Liv-, Esth- und Kurlands.

== Personal life ==
He had two sons with Elisabeth von Pistohlkors: Gustav von Bunge (1844–1920), a physiologist, and Alexander von Bunge (1851–1930), an explorer and zoologist. His older brother, Friedrich Georg von Bunge (1802–1897), was a legal historian. Bunge died on 18 July [O.S. 6 July] 1890 in Dorpat.

== Commemoration ==
Taxa

- Genus Bungea (family Orobanchaceae, formerly a member of the family Scrophulariaceae).
- Pulsatilla bungeana from genus Pulsatilla
- Caragana bungei from genus Caragana
- Chorispora bungeana from genus Chorispora
- Dracocephalum origanoides bungeanum from species Dracocephalum origanoides
- Ferula bungeana from genus Ferula
- Iris bungei from genus Iris
- Lagochilus bungei from genus Lagochilus
- Oxytropis bungei from genus Oxytropis
- Stellaria bungeana from genus Stellaria
- Ziziphora bungeana from genus Ziziphora
- Euonymus bungeanus from genus Euonymus
- Allium bungei from genus Allium.
- Pinus bungeana from genus Pinus.
- Fraxinus bungeana from genus Fraxinus
- Clerodendrum bungei from genus Clerodendrum
- Catalpa bungei from genus Catalpa.
- Girgensohnia bungeana from genus Girgensohnia.

Places

A crater on Mars and a place in New Siberian Island called Bungeland was named after him.

== Bibliography ==
- Flora Altaica; scripsit Carolus Fridericus a Ledebour, adiutoribus Car. Ant. Meyer et Al. a Bunge. Tomus I (1829)
- Flora Altaica; scripsit Carolus Fridericus a Ledebour, adiutoribus Car. Ant. Meyer et Al. a Bunge. Tomus II (1830)
- Flora Altaica; scripsit Carolus Fridericus a Ledebour, adiutoribus Car. Ant. Meyer et Al. a Bunge. Tomus III (1831)
- Flora Altaica; scripsit Carolus Fridericus a Ledebour, adiutoribus Car. Ant. Meyer et Al. a Bunge. Tomus IV (1832)
- Enumeratio plantarum quas in China boreali collegit Dr. Al. Bunge. Anno 1831. (1832)
- Plantarum mongolica-chinensium decas fine. (1835)
- Verzeichniss der im Jahre 1832 im östlichen Theile des Altai-Gebirges gesammelten Pflanzen. Ein Supplement zur Flora Altaica written with Ledebour (1836)
- Anleitung zum Studium der Botanik, oder Grundriss Dieser Wissenschaft Enthaltend die Organographie, Physiologie, Methodologie, die Pflanzen, Geographie, eine Ubersich der fossilen der pharmaceustischen Botanik und der Geschichte der Botanik written with Alphonse Pyramus de Candolle (1838)
- Alexandri Lehmann reliquiae botanicae; sive, Enumeratio plantarum in itinere per deserta Asiae Mediae ab A. Lehmann annis 1839–1842 collectarum. Scripsit Al. Bunge. (1847)
- Beitrag zur Kenntniss der Flor Russlands und der Steppen Central-Asiens, (1851) – Contribution to the knowledge of flora native to Russia and the steppes of Central Asia.
- Tentamen generis Tamaricum species accuratius definiendi. (1852)
- Plantas Abichianas in itineribus per Caucasum regionesque Transcaucasicas collectas, enumeravit A. Bunge. (1858).
- Generis Astragali species gerontogeae. (1868–1869).
- Die Gattung Acantholimon Boiss. (1872).
- Labiatae persicae, (1873).

== See also ==
- List of Baltic German scientists
- Category:Taxa named by Alexander von Bunge

== Sources ==
- "Бунге, Александр Андреевич" . Brockhaus and Efron Encyclopedic Dictionary (in Russian). 1906.
